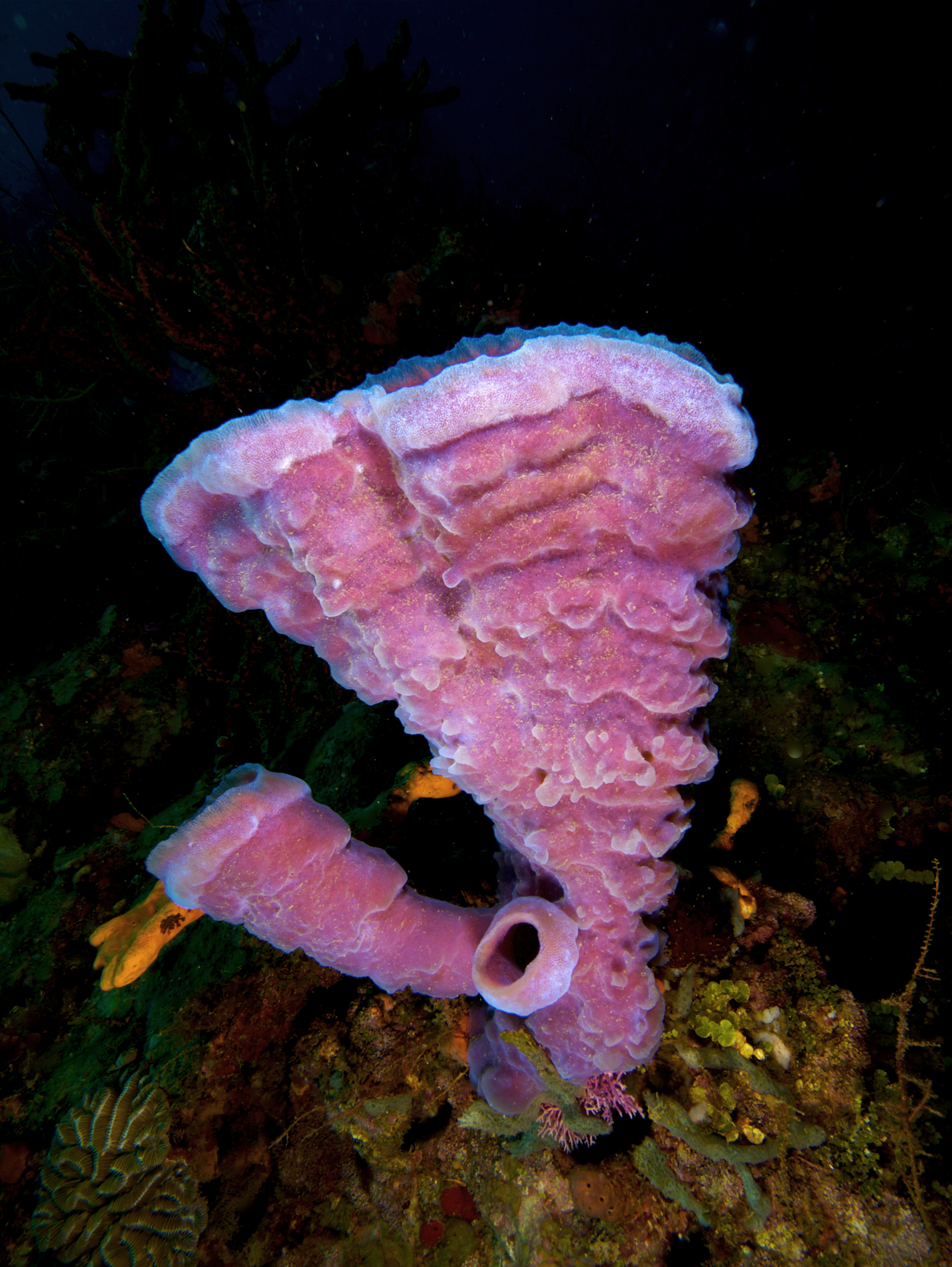

Scientific classification
- Kingdom: Animalia
- Phylum: Porifera
- Class: Demospongiae
- Order: Haplosclerida
- Family: Callyspongiidae
- Genus: Callyspongia
- Subgenus: Cladochalina
- Species: C. plicifera

Binomial name
- Callyspongia plicifera (Lamarck, 1814))

Synonyms
- List: Callyspongia (Cladochalina) plicifera (Lamarck, 1814); Callyspongia (Spinosella) plicifera (Lamarck, 1814); Patuloscula plicifera (Lamarck, 1814); Spinosella plicifera (Lamarck, 1814); Spongia plicifera Lamarck, 1814; Spongia scrobiculata Lamarck, 1814; Tuba plicifera (Lamarck, 1814); Tuba scobiculata (Lamarck, 1814)

= Callyspongia plicifera =

Azure vase sponge

Species of sponge

Callyspongia plicifera, the azure vase sponge, is a species of sea sponge belonging to the family Callyspongiidae. It is native to the Bahamas where it is found at a depth of 31.5-44.2 m. It was first described in 1814 by Jean-Baptiste Lamarck.

== Characteristics ==
The azure vase sponge is a vase shaped demosponge that grows up to 27 cm in height and 13.5 cm in diameter. Its outer surface consists of 0.5–1 cm deep rounded pits and grooves while the inner surface is smooth with 1–5 mm scattered openings. The vent at the top is up to 6.5 cm in diameter and has a thin, transparent collar. They are typically pink or light blue, but may be other colors including tan, peach or yellow and show a predominantly light blue iridescence. Since Callyspongia plicifera do not produce chemical deterrents to fish grazing, they heal and grow at a faster rate following fish grazing than other sponge species in the Caribbean. The Callyspongia plicifera has an average healing rate of 8% area regeneration per day following fish grazing.

== Gallery ==
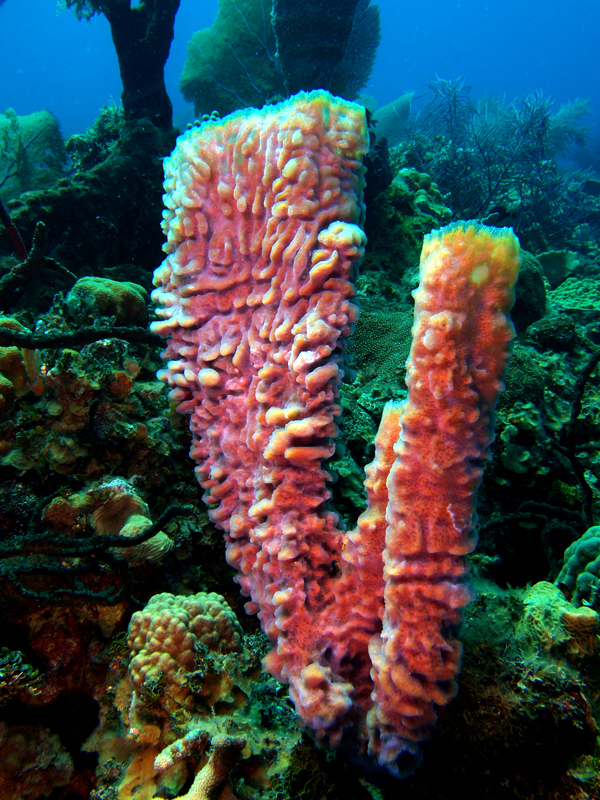
A tall pink variant.

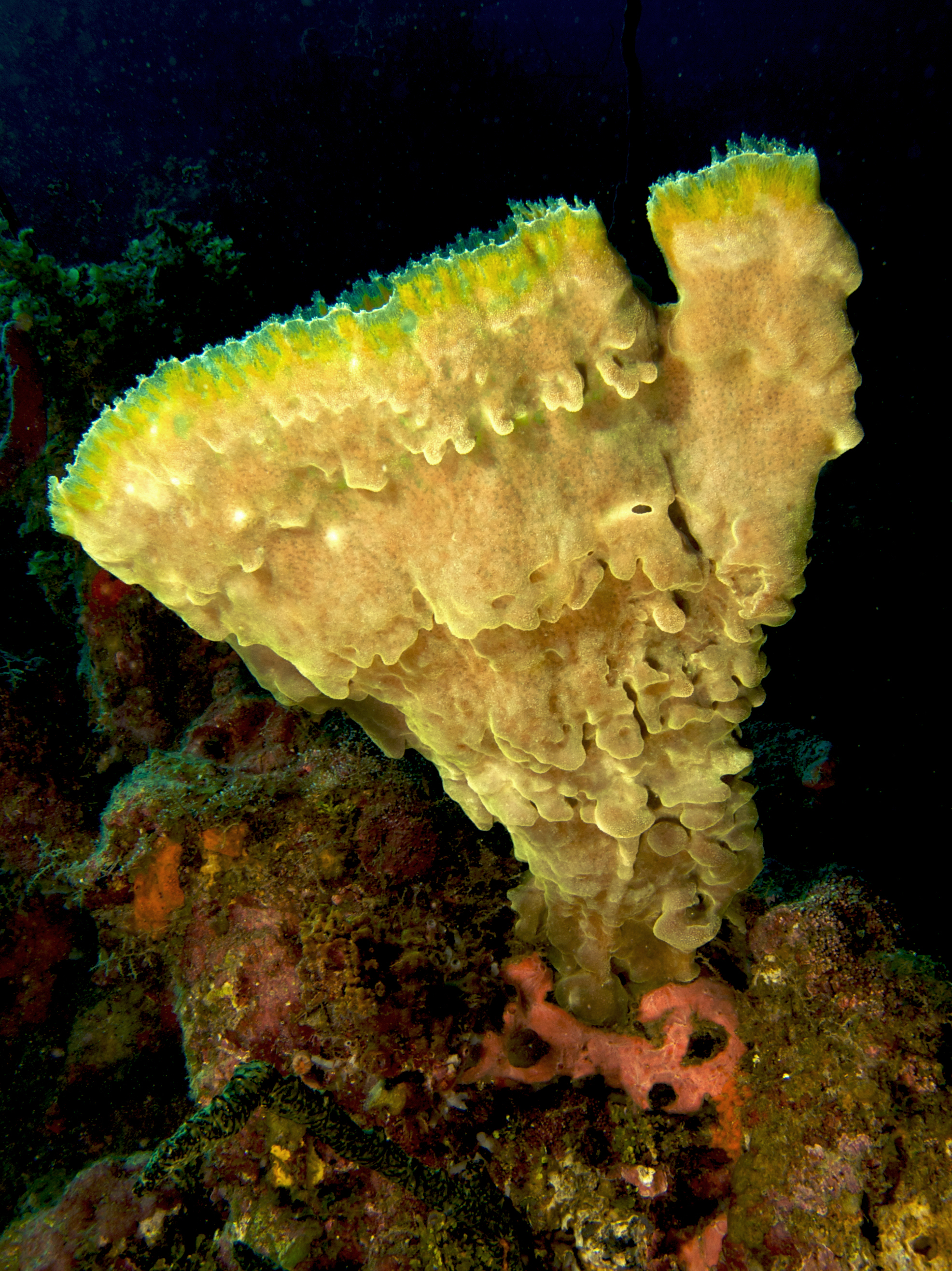
A yellow variant.

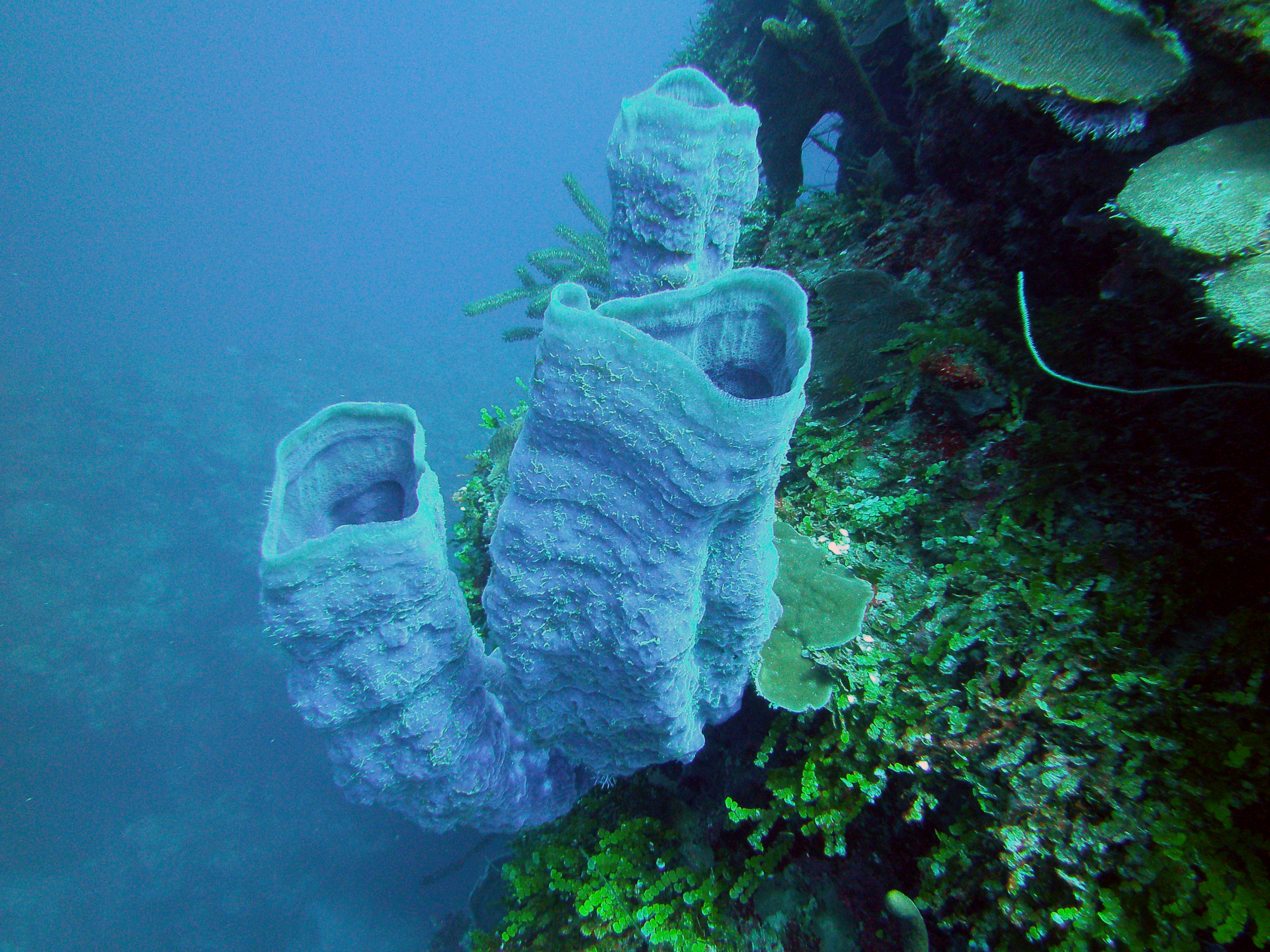
A tall blue variant.

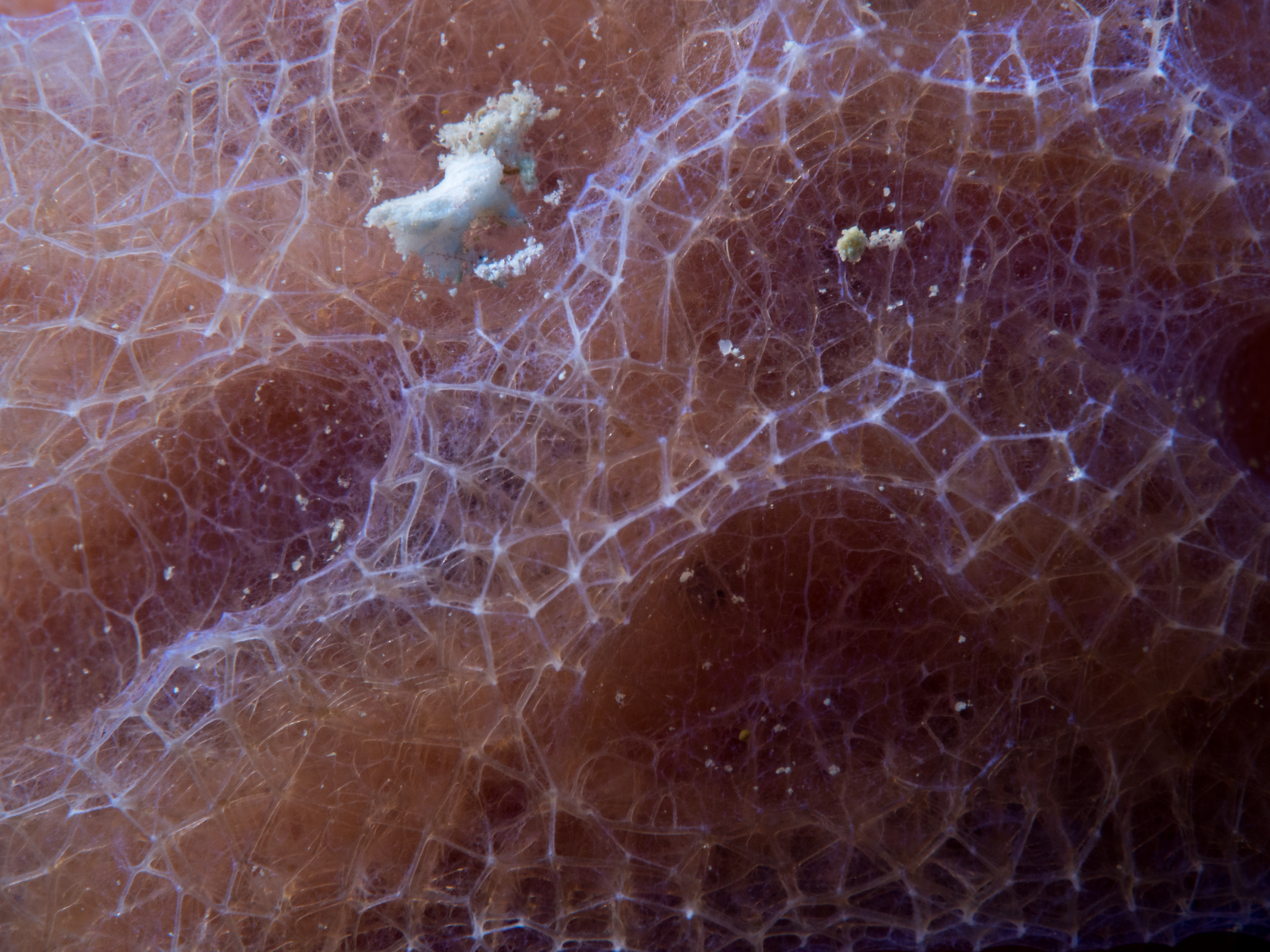
A closeup revealing the skeletal reticulation.
