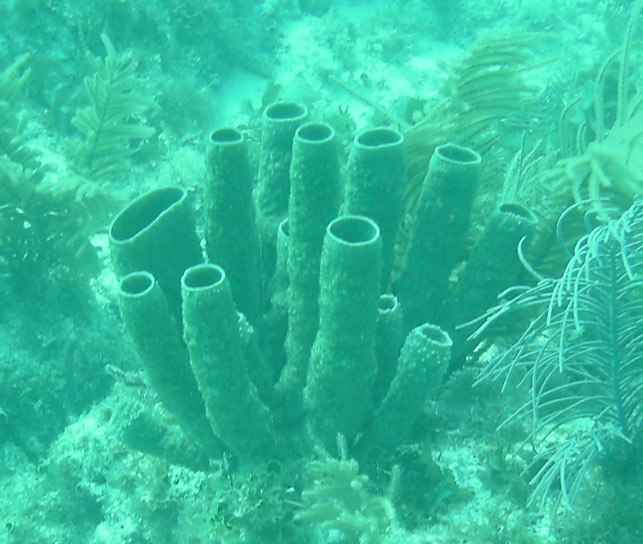

Scientific classification
- Kingdom: Animalia
- Phylum: Porifera
- Class: Demospongiae
- Order: Haplosclerida
- Family: Callyspongiidae
- Genus: Callyspongia
- Subgenus: Cladochalina
- Species: C. aculeata

Binomial name
- Callyspongia aculeata (Linnaeus, 1759)

Synonyms
- List: Callyspongia (Cladochalina) lineata (Duchassaing & Michelotti, 1864); Callyspongia (Cladochalina) papyracea (Schmidt, 1870); Callyspongia (Cladochalina) vaginalis (Lamarck, 1814); Callyspongia (Spinosella) vaginalis (Lamarck, 1814); Callyspongia simplex (Duchassaing & Michelotti, 1864); Callyspongia vaginalis (Lamarck, 1814); Siphonochalina papyracea Schmidt, 1870; Spinosella maxima Dendy, 1887; Spinosella sororia (Duchassaing & Michelotti, 1864); Spinosella vaginalis (Lamarck, 1814); Spinosella velata Dendy, 1887; Spongia bursaria Lamarck, 1814; Spongia clavaherculis Duchassaing & Michelotti, 1864; Spongia vaginalis Lamarck, 1814; Tuba bursaria (Lamarck, 1814); Tuba irregularis Duchassaing & Michelotti, 1864; Tuba lineata Duchassaing & Michelotti, 1864; Tuba megastoma Duchassaing & Michelotti, 1864; Tuba sagoti Duchassaing & Michelotti, 1864; Tuba sanctaecrucis Duchassaing & Michelotti, 1864; Tuba simplex Duchassaing & Michelotti, 1864; Tuba sororia Duchassaing & Michelotti, 1864; Tuba subenervia Duchassaing & Michelotti, 1864; Tuba tortolensis Duchassaing & Michelotti, 1864; Tuba vaginalis (Lamarck, 1814)

= Callyspongia aculeata =

Species of sponge

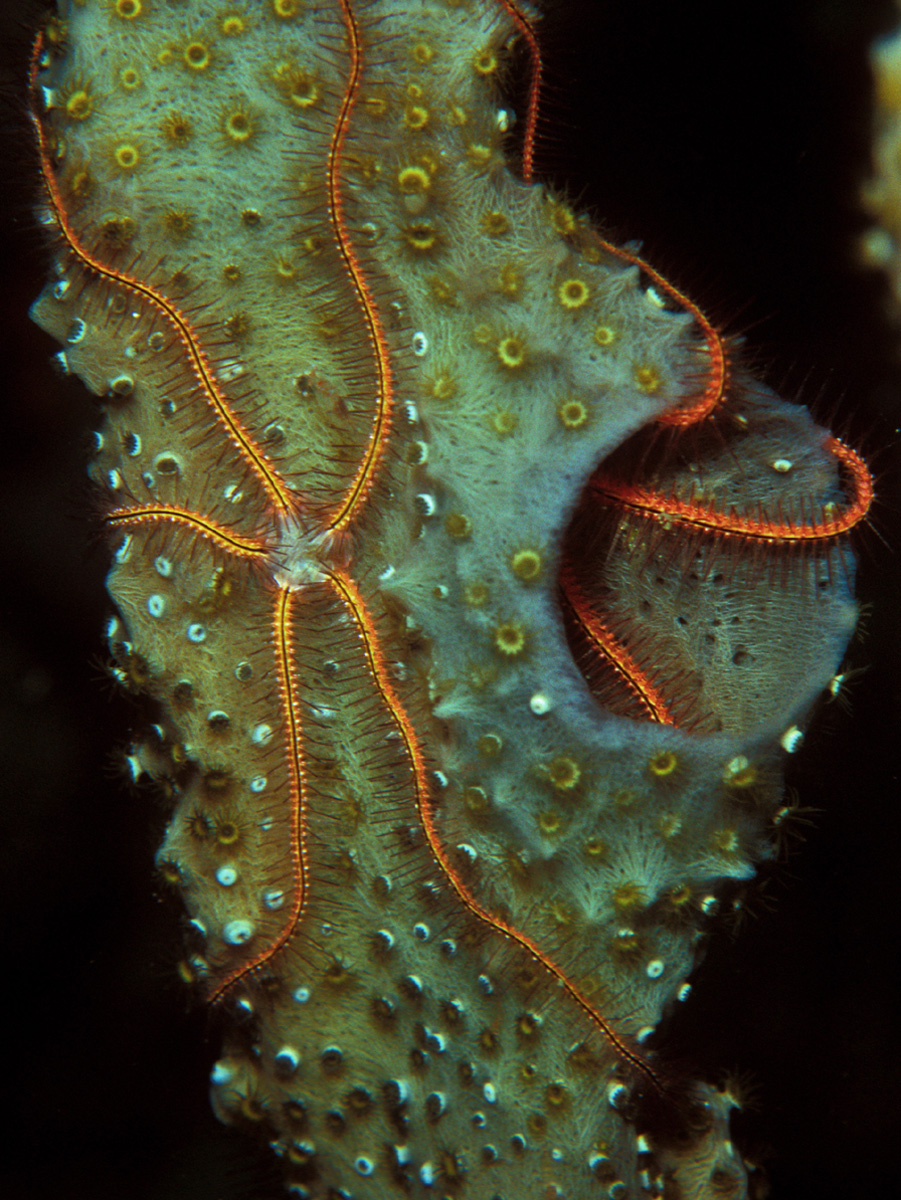
Closeup showing Ophiothrix suensonii and the parasitic Parazoanthid Umimayanthus parasiticus.

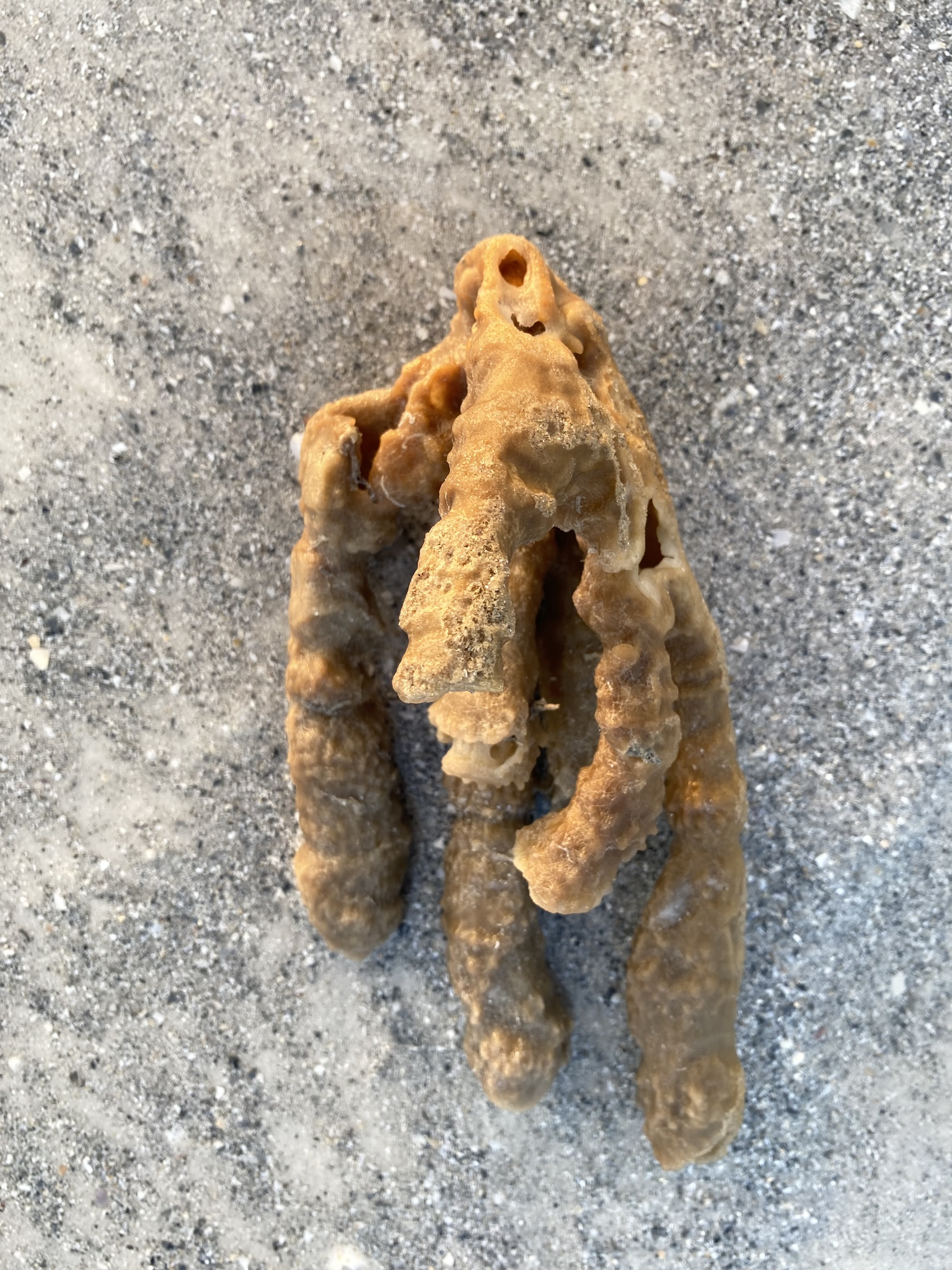
A dead callyspongia aculeata on a beach in IRB

Callyspongia (Cladochalina) aculeata, commonly known as the branching vase sponge is a species of sea sponge in the family Callyspongiidae. Poriferans are typically characterized by ostia, pores that filter out plankton, with an osculum as the opening which water leaves through, and choanocytes trap food particles.

This species is frequently colonized by Umimayanthus parasiticus, a colonial anemone, and Ophiothrix suensonii, a brittle star. It feeds on plankton and detritus. The color of C. aculeata is variable, ranging from red to orange, lavender to brownish-gray, greenish-gray, and sometimes light tan.

== Defining Traits ==
Callyspongia aculeata usually has a tubular growth pattern, although the magnitude of the current affects its growth form. The dominant morphotypes are tubular elongated and tubular vasiform. The long, erect tubes taper slightly and have a wide vent up to 2.5 cm in diameter with a thin wall. The sponge has very elastic tubes that vary in length and can stand singly or with other tubes. The sponge is rough with its irregular pits and nubs covering its surface. The species is found on hard surfaces, usually reef plateaus and deep reef slopes.

== Distribution ==
Callyspongia aculeata lives in the area of the Caribbean, Florida, Bermuda, and the Bahamas. It grows at a temperature of 20°-24 °C.

== Ecological Role ==
Callyspongia aculeata plays host to many other invertebrate species including Ophiothrix lineata and various amphipods including Leucothoe kensleyi and Leucothoe ashleyae.

== Morphology ==
Through anastomosis, the sponge can become linked. Porifera are suspension feeders, meaning they can filter plankton and other microorganisms through its osculum. Porifera contain choanocytes, pinacocytes, and archeocytes. The structure of the choanocyte being a singular flagellum surrounded by microvilli is a characteristic of most porifera which allows water to enter. This canal system, however, differs within Demospongia because the choanocyte chambers differ.

Among the class Demospongiae, skeletons are formed mainly of spongin. Spongin is the main component that makes up the sponge skeleton. While sponges lack defined organ systems, the tissue is composed of pinacocytes and choanocytes, two types of cells on the sponge surface. In terms of structure, large branching erect sponges are prone to toppling during storms, while smaller sponges remained higher in biomass after storm events. In hurricanes, surviving sponges were found to have different silica in their fiber skeletons. Sponges with a larger openings and smaller bases are less prone to breakage and live easier in shallower water than sponges with thin, narrow branches.

Sponges are hermaphroditic, and members of demospongiae can develop sexually produced larvae or from asexual fragments. Asexual fragmentation happens when one species divides into smaller segments and sponges may be more successful at asexually reproducing, because they don't need sexually generated larvae. Additionally, they can spread through larger areas faster so their dispersion rate is increased. Considering environmental circumstances, sponges are able to undergo fragmentation as a survival strategy in disturbed states. Although Callyspongia aculeata has not been studied in depth, Callyspongia diffusa in the genus was found to have a spicular skeleton encased in spongin.

== Feeding ==
As with most sponges, Callyspongia aculeata is a filter feeder, consuming microorganisms such as phytoplankton.
