= Callyspongia serpentina =

Scientific classification
- Kingdom: Animalia
- Phylum: Porifera
- Class: Demospongiae
- Order: Haplosclerida
- Family: Callyspongiidae
- Genus: Callyspongia
- Subgenus: Callyspongia
- Species: C. serpentina

Binomial name
- Callyspongia serpentina (Lamarck, 1814)

Synonyms
- List: Callyspongia elongata (Lendenfeld, 1887); Callyspongia serpens (Lendenfeld, 1887); Callyspongia serpentina (Lamarck, 1814); Ceraochalina typica Lendenfeld, 1887; Chalina moniliformis Carter, 1885; Chalina oculata novaezealandiae Dendy, 1924; Chalina polychotoma angulata Carter, 1885; Chalina polychotoma moniliformis Carter, 1885; Chalinissa communis Lendenfeld, 1887; Chalinissa elegans Lendenfeld, 1887; Chalinissa elongata Lendenfeld, 1887; Chalinissa macropora Lendenfeld, 1887; Chalinissa ramosa Lendenfeld, 1887; Chalinissa rigida Lendenfeld, 1887; Chalinissa serpens Lendenfeld, 1887; Chalinissa tenuifibris Lendenfeld, 1887; Pachychalina elongata Ridley & Dendy, 1886; Spongia serpentina Lamarck, 1814

Species of sponge

Callyspongia serpentina is a species of demosponges in the family Callyspongiidae. It is found in Australia and New Zealand.
