= Callyspongia johannesthielei =

Scientific classification
- Domain: Eukaryota
- Kingdom: Animalia
- Phylum: Porifera
- Class: Demospongiae
- Order: Haplosclerida
- Family: Callyspongiidae
- Genus: Callyspongia
- Subgenus: Cladochalina
- Species: C. johannesthielei

Binomial name
- Callyspongia johannesthielei Van Soest & Hooper, 2020

Synonyms
- Spinosella elegans Thiele, 1899; Callyspongia elegans (Thiele, 1899)

Species of sponge

Callyspongia (Cladochalina) johannesthielei is a species of demosponge in the family Callyspongiidae. It is found in Indonesia.
