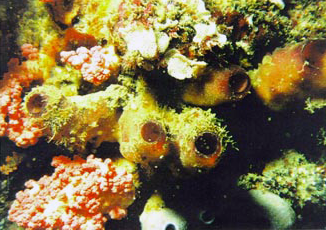

Scientific classification
- Kingdom: Animalia
- Phylum: Porifera
- Class: Demospongiae
- Order: Haplosclerida
- Family: Callyspongiidae
- Genus: Callyspongia
- Species: C. truncata

Binomial name
- Callyspongia truncata (Lendenfeld, 1887)

Synonyms
- List: Chalinopora truncata Lendenfeld, 1887; Siphonochalina axialis Lendenfeld, 1887; Siphonochalina elastica Lendenfeld, 1887; Siphonochalina extensa Lendenfeld, 1887; Siphonochalina laxa Lendenfeld, 1887; Siphonochalina paucispina Lendenfeld, 1887; Siphonochalina typica Lendenfeld, 1887

= Callyspongia truncata =

Species of sponge

Callyspongia truncata is a species of marine sea sponge. Like all marine sponges, C. truncata is a member of phylum Porifera and is defined by its filter-feeding lifestyle and flagellated choanocytes, or collar cells, that allow for water movement and feeding. It is a species of demosponge and a member of Demospongiae, the largest class of sponges as well as the family Callyspongiidae. C. truncata is most well known for being the organism from which the polyketide Callystatin A was identified. Callystatin A is a polyketide natural product from the leptomycin family of antibiotics. It was first isolated in 1997 from this organism, which was collected from the Goto Islands in the Nagasaki Prefecture of Japan by the Kobayashi group. Recent studies have revealed numerous other bioactive compounds that have been found in this species.

== Description ==
C. truncata, like all sponges, has a relatively simple body plan. They lack true tissues and are asymmetrical, meaning that the species has no distinct shape. Shape varies due to a number of factors such as environment. They are most commonly found to be a tube-like shape. Color is environmentally dependent as well. Internally, the body is designed to pump water. The outer body is covered in many pores. These are known as ostia, and are a characteristic of all poriferans. These ostia allow water to enter the sponge from the outside. The inside of the sponge consists of internal water canals leading to one central cavity. The body is lined with numerous specialized cells known as choanocytes, which are used in feeding. The top of the sponge is an opening called the osculum, through which water is expelled during feeding.

== Distribution ==
C. truncata is limited to marine environments. Members of the genus Callyspongia are found primarily in tropical environments, notably the Central and Western Pacific. They have also been found in the Indian, West Atlantic, and East Pacific oceans. C. truncata is known to inhabit the Western Central Pacific Ocean, and it has also been found around Vietnam and Japan. Like all sponges, they are sessile organisms, meaning that they are incapable of locomotion and remain attached to the substrate they settle on. They are benthic, or bottom dwelling, and are generally found living attached to rocks or other substrates.

== Life History ==
=== Reproduction ===
C. truncata are hermaphroditic, meaning they are capable of producing both male and female gametes. Zygotes fuse to form parenchymal, or free-swimming larvae. The larva settles onto a hard substrate and begins to undergo metamorphosis, or the process of growing into an adult sponge. After the larva attaches to a substrate, it begins to spread across the substrate with a centralized mass in the middle. A type of cells known as amoebocytes form a membrane apart from the central part of the larva, which starts to flatten as the membrane pulls away from the center. Spongin, the compound that makes up the skeleton of a sponge, is formed between the larva and the substrate. Next, the flattened cells move into the internal part of the larval mass, while the amoebocytes move to the outside of the body to form an outer layer. The movements of these two groups of cells are seen in all parenchymal larvae. Collar cells are formed from the original mass of larval cells. The internal water canal system is formed, followed by the outer pore and the osculum, which signifies the final stage of metamorphosis.

=== Feeding ===
C. truncata is a filter feeder that feeds primarily on detritus and plankton. They are active filter feeders, meaning they are capable of pumping water and filtering particles from it. This is opposed to passive filter feeders, which feed by capturing food that passes over their feeding appendages via the water current. Sponges are capable of creating their own current that allows them to bring food directly to them. Their bodies are lined with numerous pores called ostia. Water enters the body through these pores. As the water passes through the sponge's body, the collar cells filter out food particles and plankton, which are then utilized by the sponge. The remaining water passes back into the water column through the osculum.

== Additional ==
Many types of bioactive compounds have been found in C. truncata. Some of these compounds include polyacetylenes, steroids, polyketides, and alkaloids. Callystatin A, a polyketide used in medicine and antibiotics, was first discovered in C. truncata. The compounds found in the animal are also shown to affect certain species of animals. Two polyacetylene sulfate compounds known as Callyspongin a and b were isolated from C. truncata. These two compounds were found to have an effect on the fertilization of sea star gametes. It was observed that the high enough concentrations of the compounds were capable of interfering with the formation of the embryos. Certain concentrations of the compound impacted sperm mobility and prevented the sperm from reaching the egg for fertilization. Further investigation revealed that the compound prevented fertilized eggs from being able to form a fertilization envelope.
