= Callyspongia bispicula =

Scientific classification
- Kingdom: Animalia
- Phylum: Porifera
- Class: Demospongiae
- Order: Haplosclerida
- Family: Callyspongiidae
- Genus: Callyspongia
- Species: C. bispicula

Binomial name
- Callyspongia bispicula Tanita, 1961

Species of sponge

Callyspongia bispicula is a species of sponge, first described in 1961 by Senji Tanita.

It is found attached to rocks at depths of approximately 20–30 metres, in Japan and in South Korea in Busan.
