= Callyspongia elegans =

Scientific classification
- Kingdom: Animalia
- Phylum: Porifera
- Class: Demospongiae
- Order: Haplosclerida
- Family: Callyspongiidae
- Genus: Callyspongia
- Subgenus: Callyspongia
- Species: C. elegans

Binomial name
- Callyspongia elegans (Lendenfeld, 1887)

Synonyms
- Chalinella macropora Lendenfeld, 1887; Chalinella tenella Lendenfeld, 1887; Cladochalina elegans Lendenfeld, 1887

Species of sponge

Callyspongia elegans is a species of demosponge in the genus Callyspongia.
