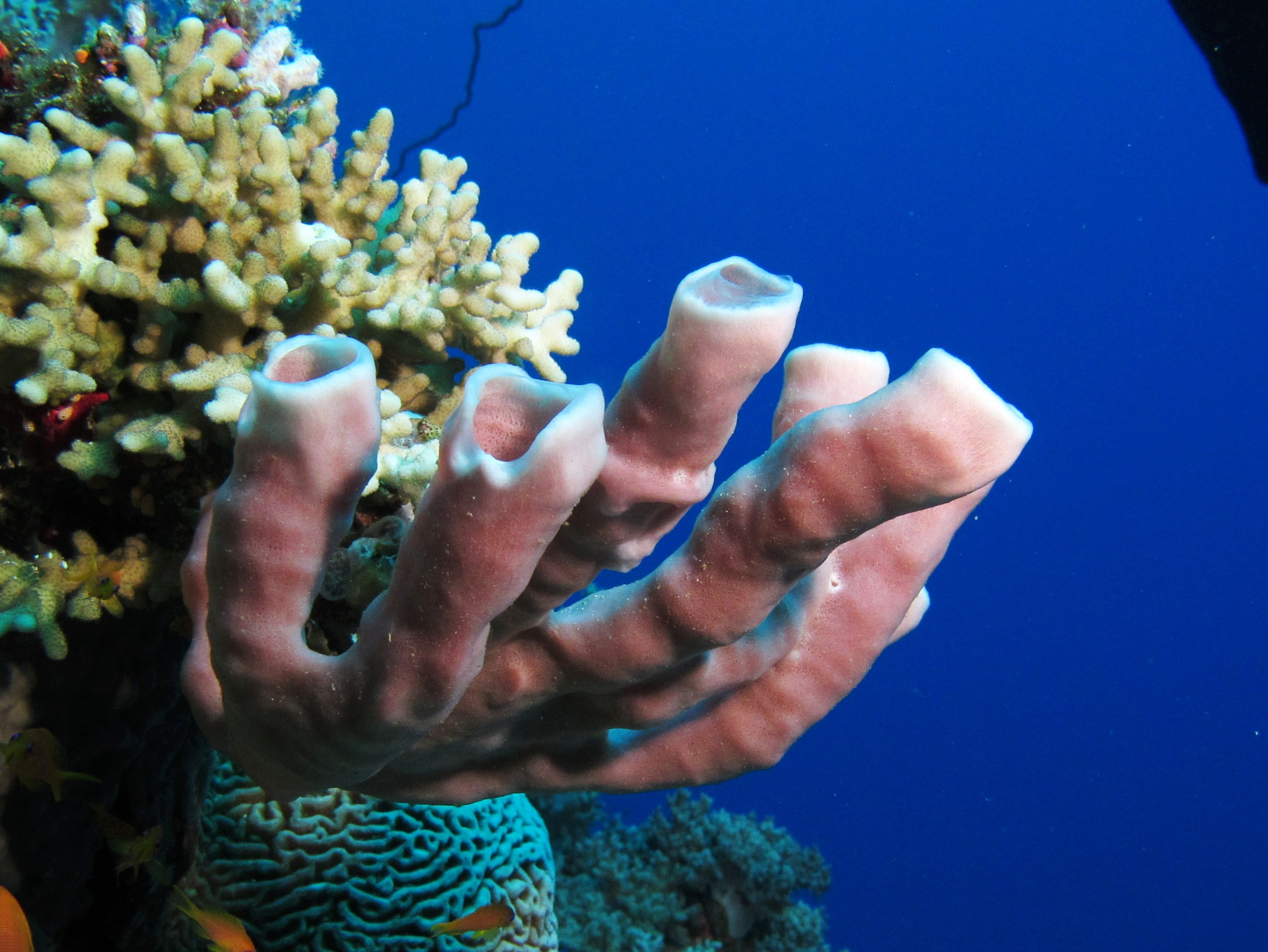
- A pink variant of Callyspongia siphonella

Scientific classification
- Kingdom: Animalia
- Phylum: Porifera
- Class: Demospongiae
- Order: Haplosclerida
- Family: Callyspongiidae
- Genus: Callyspongia
- Subgenus: Callyspongia
- Species: C. siphonella

Binomial name
- Callyspongia siphonella Lévi, 1965

Synonyms
- Siphonochalina siphonella Lévi, 1965

= Callyspongia siphonella =

Species of sponge

Callyspongia siphonella, commonly known as colonial tube-sponge, is a species of sea sponge endemic to the Red Sea. Clusters of its pale lavender to pink long tubes reach up to 60 centimetres (24 in) in size. Callyspongia siphonella contains a bioactive compound, Sipholenol A., that has been studied for its anti-proliferative properties in human breast cancer; these properties provide promise in its potential for developing future compounds and thus contributes greatly to future cancer research.

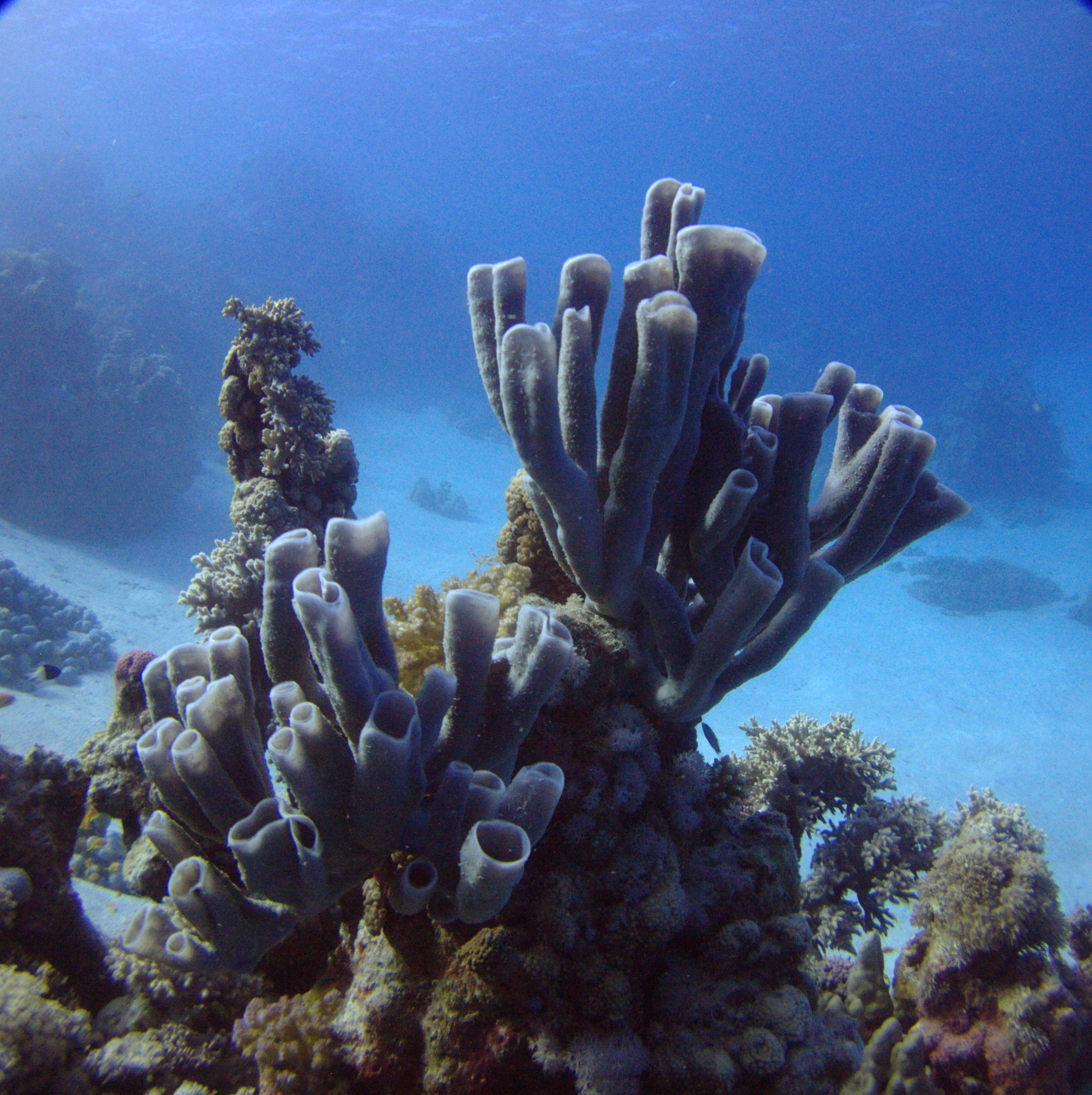
A purple variant.
