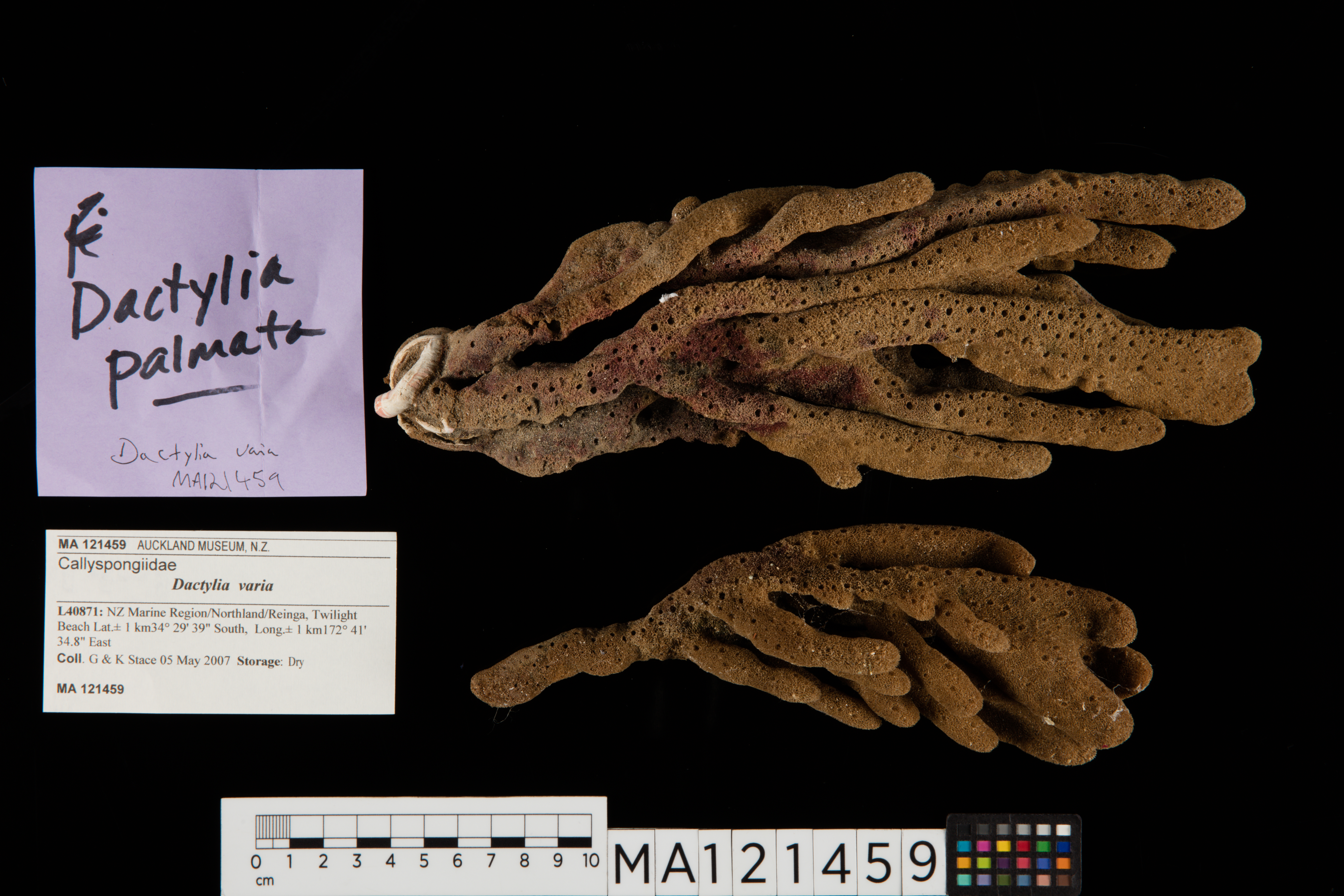

Scientific classification
- Kingdom: Animalia
- Phylum: Porifera
- Class: Demospongiae
- Order: Haplosclerida
- Family: Callyspongiidae
- Genus: Dactylia
- Species: D. varia

Binomial name
- Dactylia varia (Gray, 1843)

= Dactylia varia =

Species of sponge

Dactylia varia is a species of sponge in the family Callyspongiidae.

They are omnivores. They also reproduce sexually.

It has been found near New Zealand and Australia.
