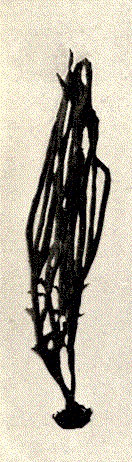
- Dactylia imitans

Scientific classification
- Domain: Eukaryota
- Kingdom: Animalia
- Phylum: Porifera
- Class: Demospongiae
- Order: Haplosclerida
- Family: Callyspongiidae
- Genus: Dactylia; Carter, 1885

Species
- See text

Synonyms
- Chalinopsilla Lendenfeld, 1888

= Dactylia =

Genus of sponges

Dactylia is a genus of demosponges in the family Callyspongiidae.

== Species ==
- Dactylia australis (Lendenfeld, 1889)
- Dactylia candelabrum (Lendenfeld, 1889)
- Dactylia carteri Van Soest & Hooper, 2020
- Dactylia ceratosa (Dendy, 1887)
- Dactylia clavata (Lendenfeld, 1889)
- Dactylia crispata (Lamarck, 1814)
- Dactylia dichotoma (Lendenfeld, 1886)
- Dactylia elegans (Lendenfeld, 1888)
- Dactylia illawarra (Lendenfeld, 1889)
- Dactylia imitans (Lendenfeld, 1886)
- Dactylia impar Carter, 1885
- Dactylia radix (Lendenfeld, 1888)
- Dactylia repens (Carter, 1886)
- Dactylia syphonoides (Lamarck, 1814)
- Dactylia varia (Gray, 1843)
