= Dactylia elegans =

Scientific classification
- Kingdom: Animalia
- Phylum: Porifera
- Class: Demospongiae
- Order: Haplosclerida
- Family: Callyspongiidae
- Genus: Dactylia
- Species: D. elegans

Binomial name
- Dactylia elegans (Lendenfeld, 1888)

Synonyms
- Chalinopsilla elegans Lendenfeld, 1888

Species of sponge

Dactylia elegans is a species of demosponges in the family Callyspongiidae. It is found in Western Australia.
