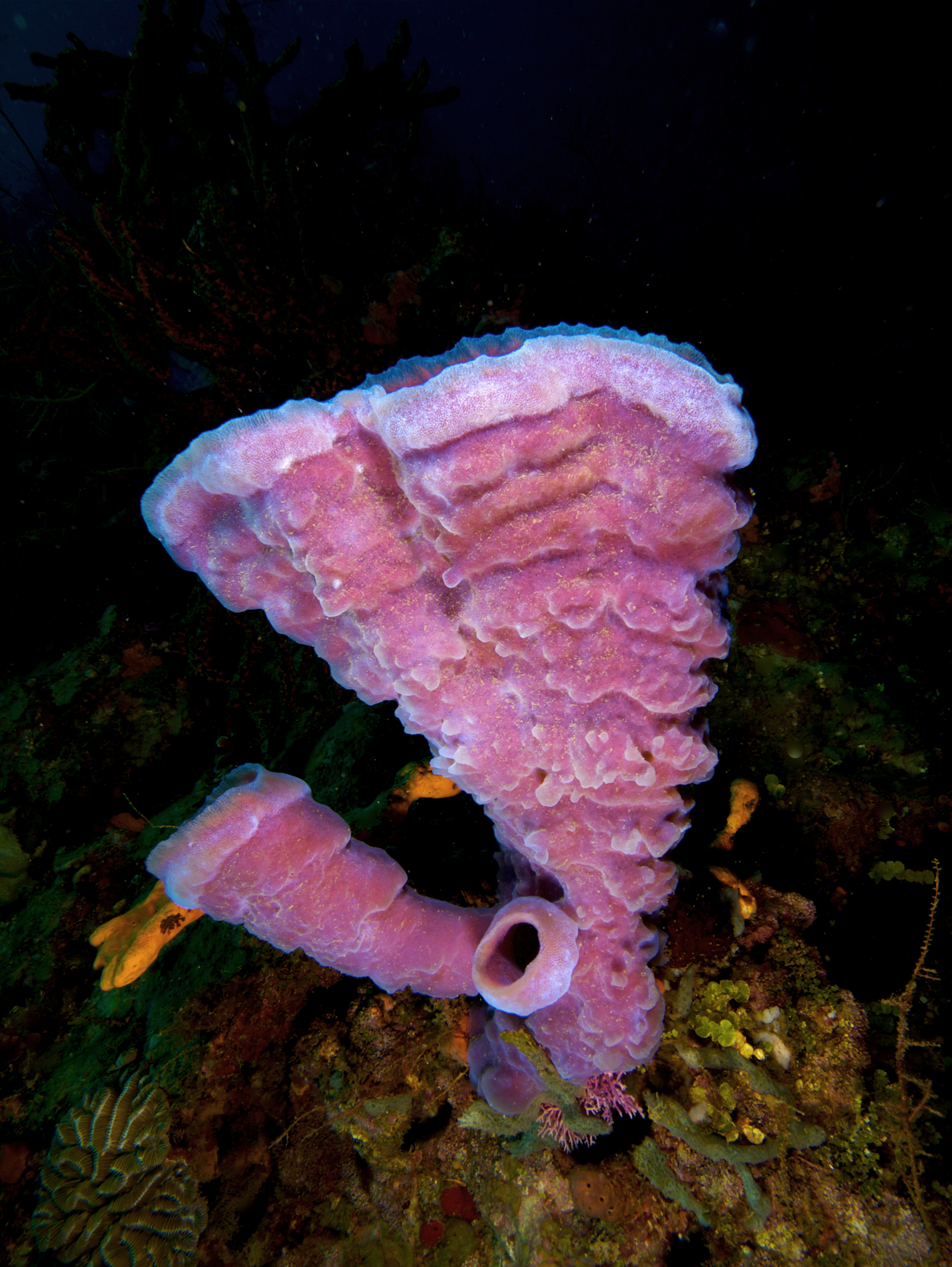
- Callyspongia plicifera (the azure vase sponge – pink variation).

Scientific classification
- Kingdom: Animalia
- Phylum: Porifera
- Class: Demospongiae
- Order: Haplosclerida
- Family: Callyspongiidae
- Genus: Callyspongia; Duchassaing & Michelotti, 1864

Species
- See text

Synonyms
- Cacochalina Schmidt, 1868

= Callyspongia =

Genus of sponges

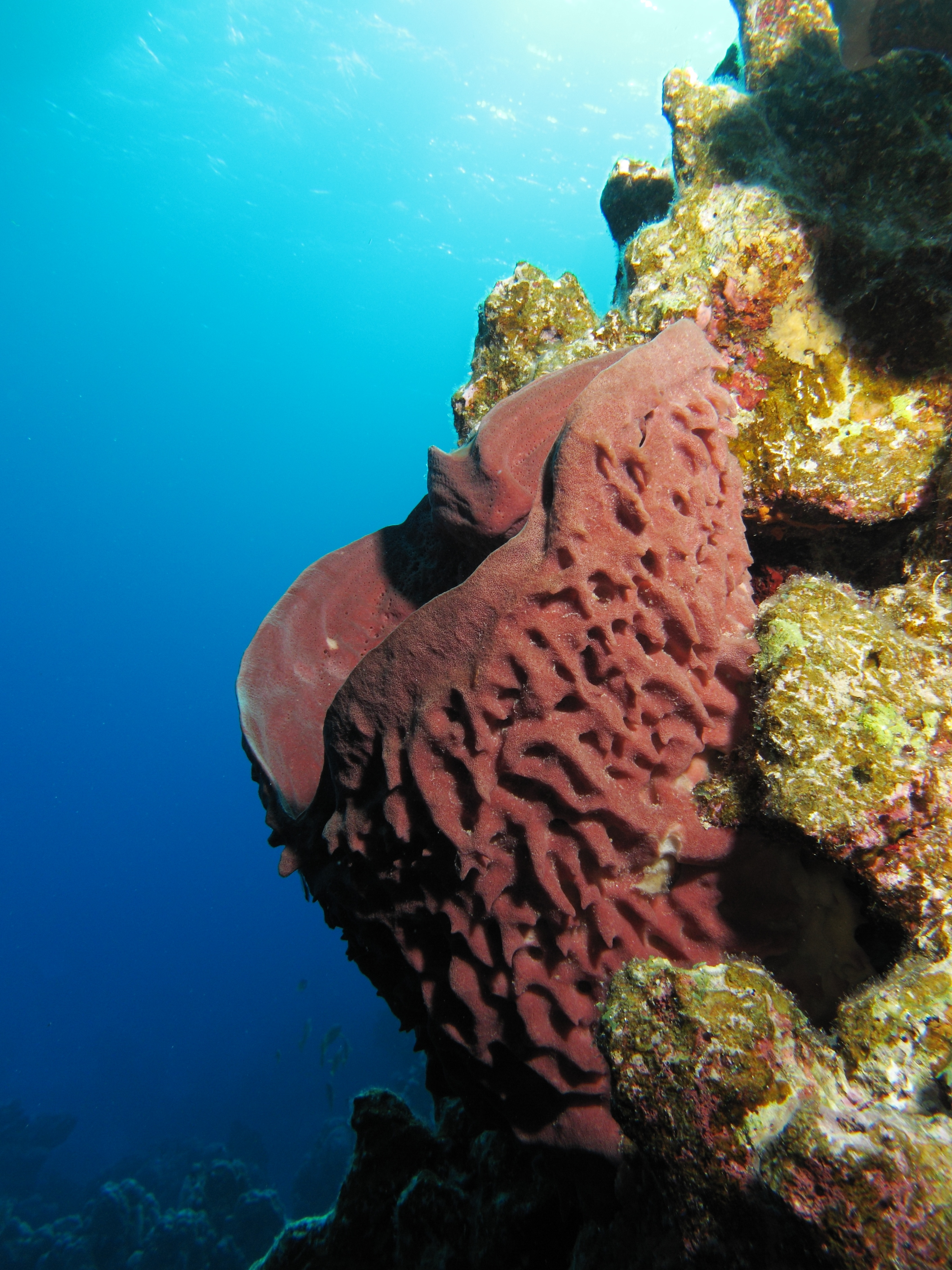
Callyspongia crassa

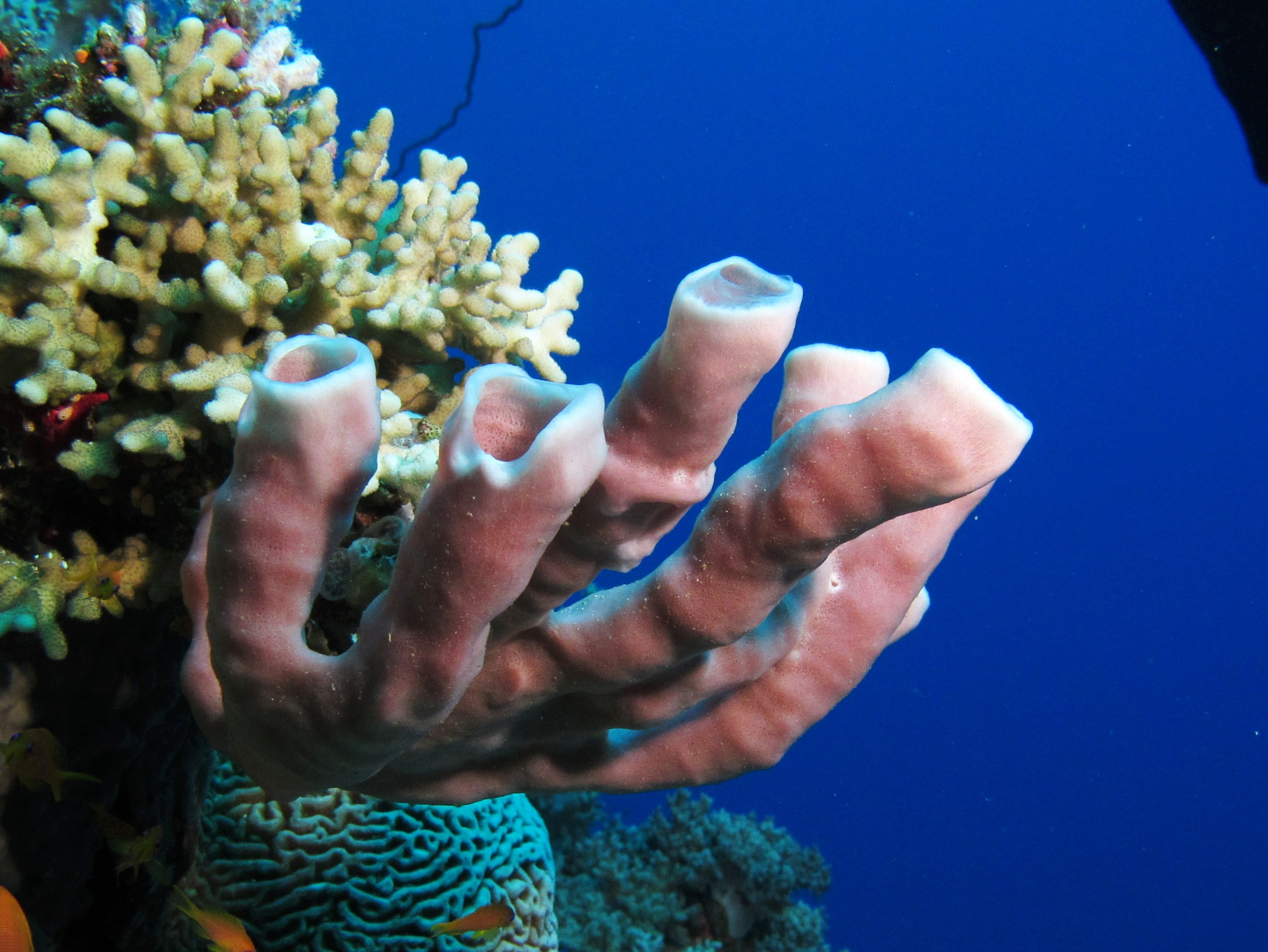
Callyspongia siphonella

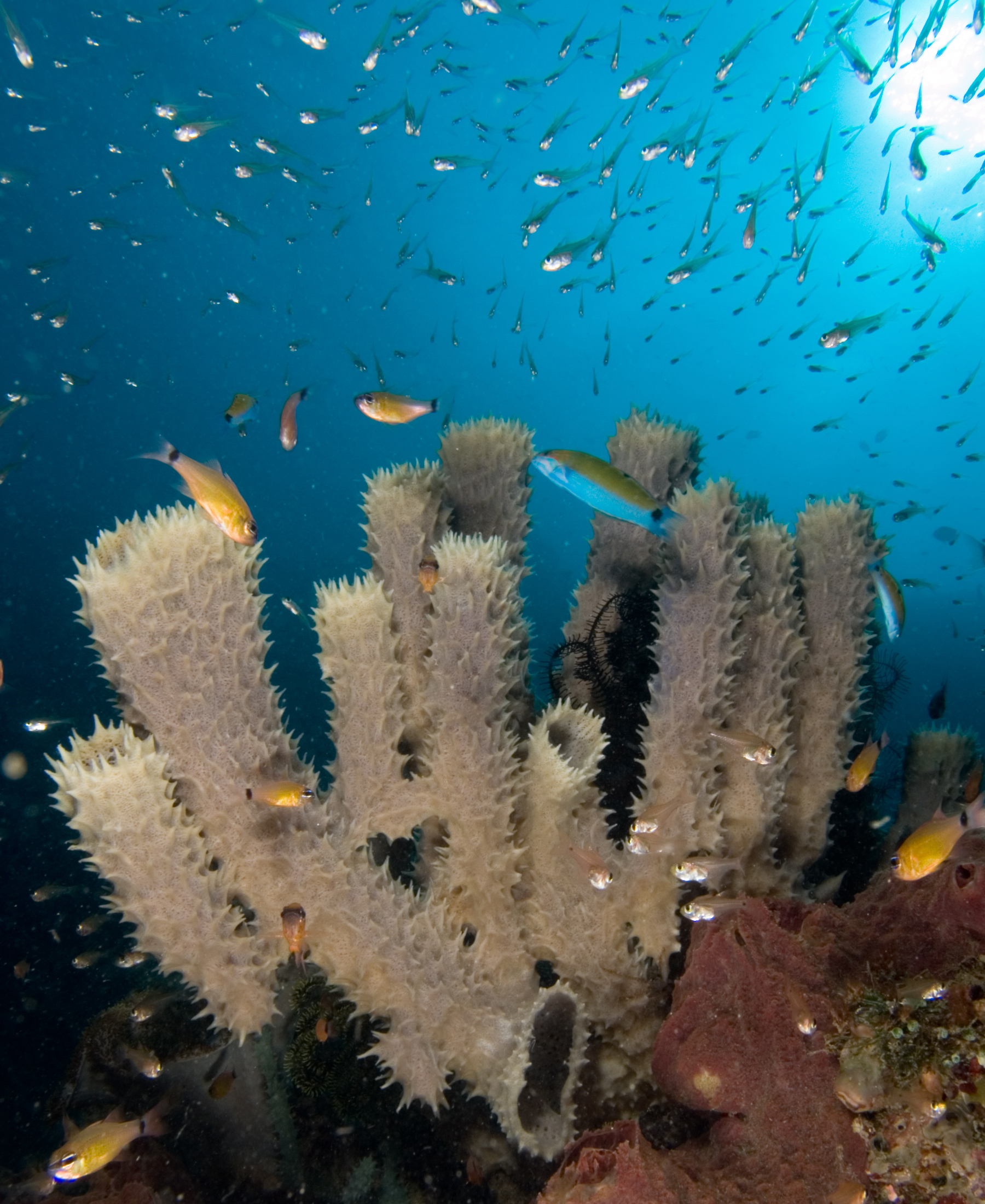
Callyspongia aerizusa

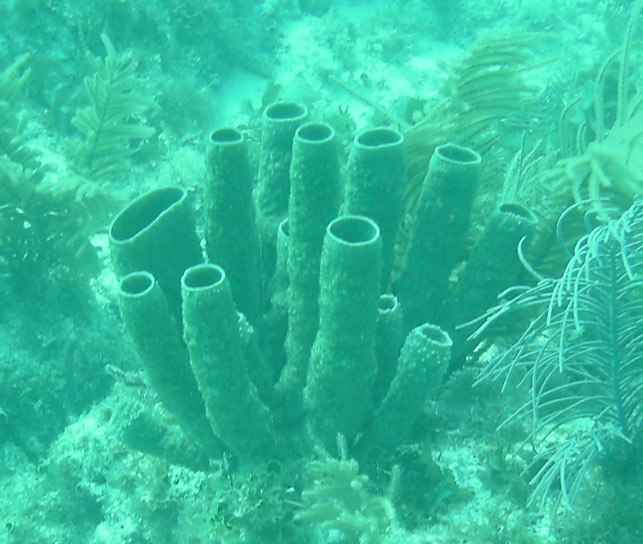
Callyspongia aculeata

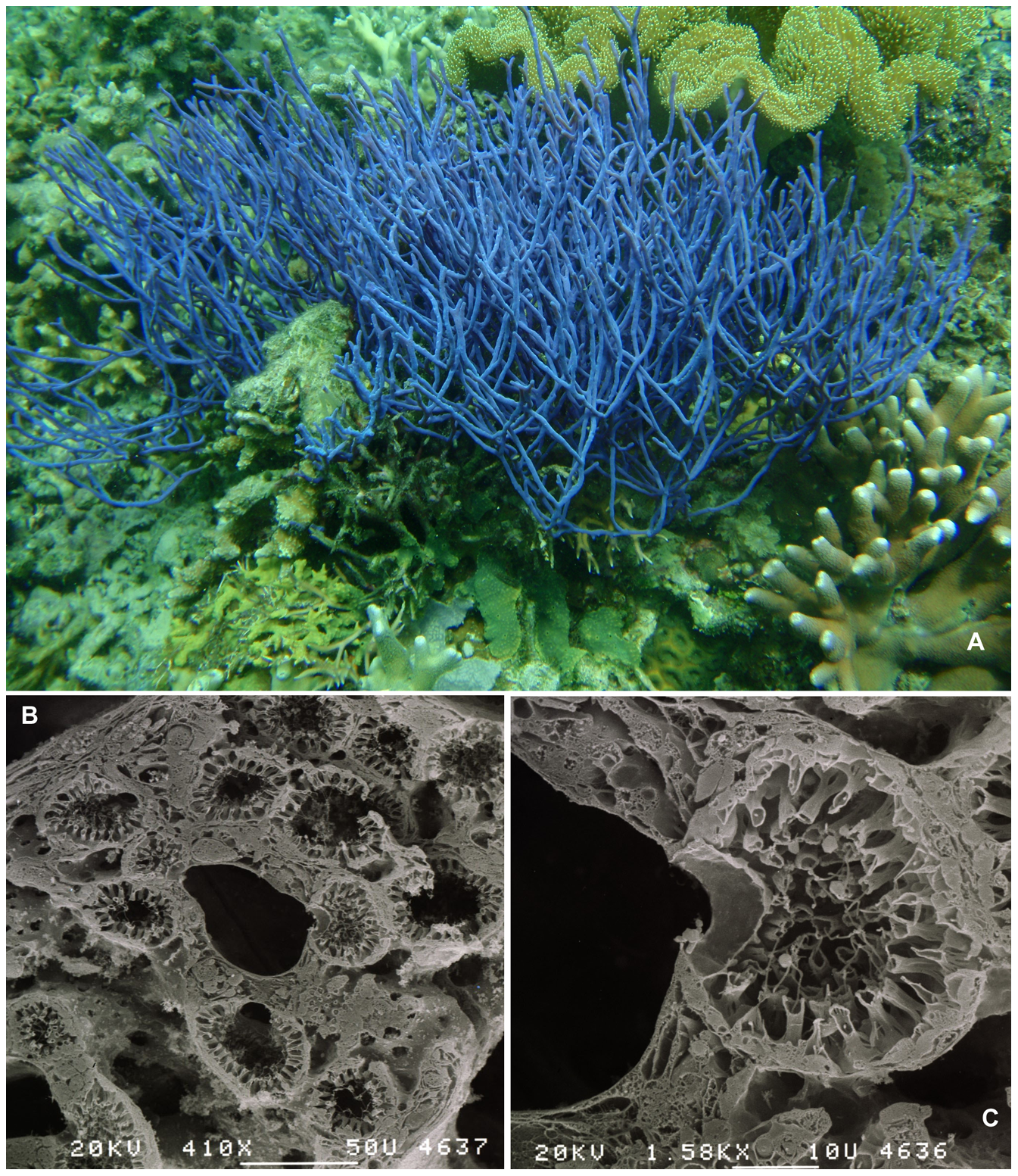
Callyspongia samarensis

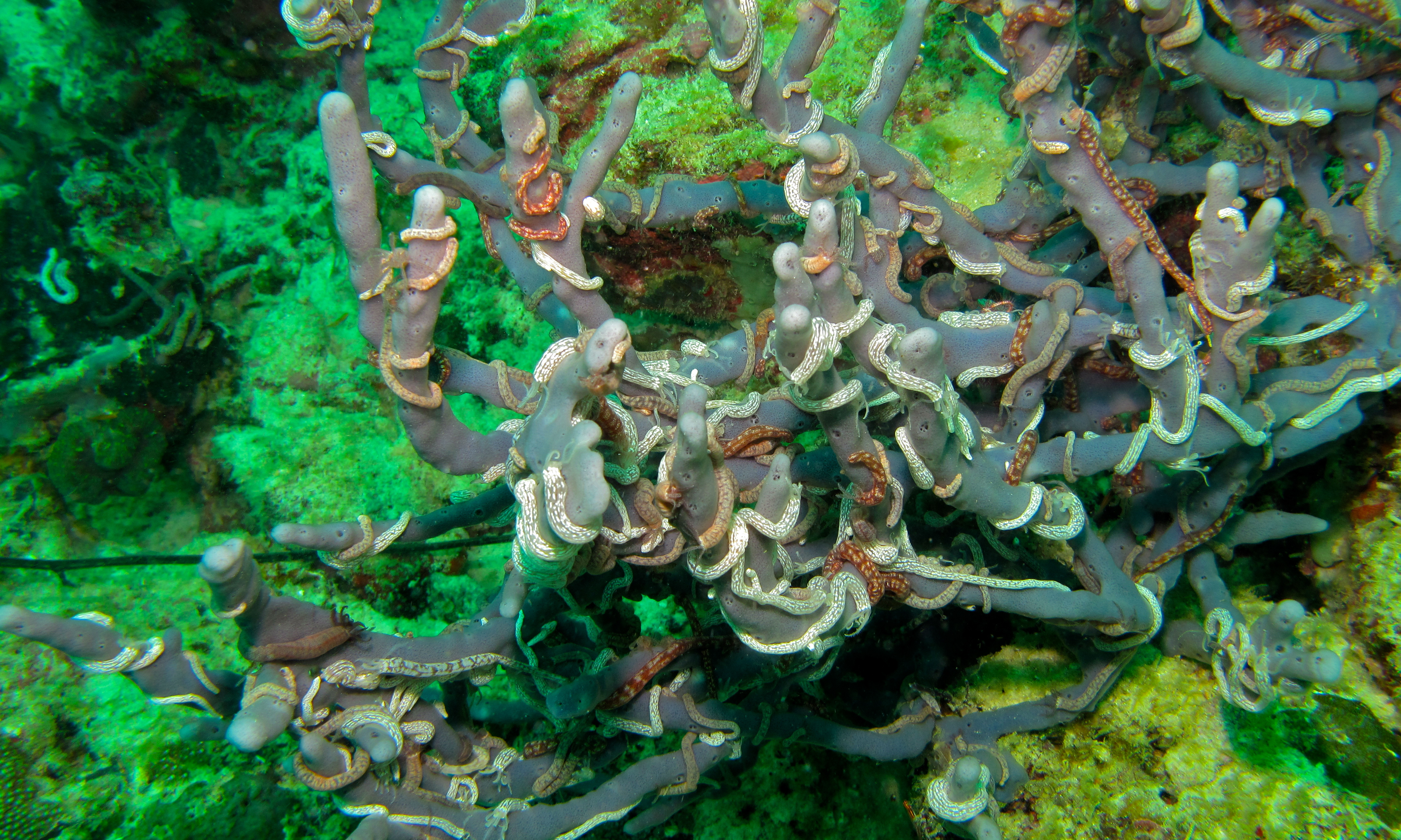
Callyspongia biru

Callyspongia is a genus of demosponges in the family Callyspongiidae.

== Species ==
The following species are recognised in the genus Callyspongia:

=== Subgenus Callyspongia (Callyspongia) Duchassaing & Michelotti, 1864 ===
- Callyspongia (Callyspongia) aspinosa Lévi, 1959
- Callyspongia (Callyspongia) barodensis Burton, 1959
- Callyspongia (Callyspongia) bullata (Lamarck, 1814)
- Callyspongia (Callyspongia) burtoni Van Soest & Hooper, 2020
- Callyspongia (Callyspongia) dendyi (Burton, 1929)
- Callyspongia (Callyspongia) densasclera Lehnert & van Soest, 1999
- Callyspongia (Callyspongia) differentiata (Dendy, 1922)
- Callyspongia (Callyspongia) elegans (Lendenfeld, 1887)
- Callyspongia (Callyspongia) eschrichtii Duchassaing & Michelotti, 1864
- Callyspongia (Callyspongia) fadwae Samaai, Pillay & Janson, 2019
- Callyspongia (Callyspongia) fallax Duchassaing & Michelotti, 1864
- Callyspongia (Callyspongia) fistulosa (Kirk, 1911)
- Callyspongia (Callyspongia) infundibuliformis (Bergquist, Morton & Tizard, 1971)
- Callyspongia (Callyspongia) lacera (Lamarck, 1814)
- Callyspongia (Callyspongia) monilata (Ridley, 1884)
- Callyspongia (Callyspongia) mucosa Lehnert & Stone, 2013
- Callyspongia (Callyspongia) nuda (Ridley, 1884)
- Callyspongia (Callyspongia) pallida Hechtel, 1965
- Callyspongia (Callyspongia) paucispina (Lendenfeld, 1887)
- Callyspongia (Callyspongia) pedroi Busutil, García-Hernández, Díaz & Pomponi, 2018
- Callyspongia (Callyspongia) pulitzeri Van Soest & Hooper, 2020
- Callyspongia (Callyspongia) reticutis (Dendy, 1905)
- Callyspongia (Callyspongia) roosevelti van Soest, Kaiser & Van Syoc, 2011
- Callyspongia (Callyspongia) rosa Kelly-Borges & Bergquist, 1988
- Callyspongia (Callyspongia) rowi Burton, 1959
- Callyspongia (Callyspongia) scutica Van Soest, 2017
- Callyspongia (Callyspongia) serpentina (Lamarck, 1814)
- Callyspongia (Callyspongia) siphonella (Lévi, 1965)
- Callyspongia (Callyspongia) strongylophora Hartman, 1955
- Callyspongia (Callyspongia) tubulosa (Linnaeus, 1759)

=== Subgenus Callyspongia (Cavochalina) Carter, 1885 ===
- Callyspongia (Cavochalina) bilamellata (Lamarck, 1814)

=== Subgenus Callyspongia (Cladochalina) Schmidt, 1870 ===
- Callyspongia (Cladochalina) acapulcaensis (Carter, 1882)
- Callyspongia (Cladochalina) aculeata (Linnaeus, 1759)
- Callyspongia (Cladochalina) aerizusa Desqueyroux-Faúndez, 1984
- Callyspongia (Cladochalina) affinis (Hentschel, 1912)
- Callyspongia (Cladochalina) alcoladoi Busutil, García-Hernández, Díaz & Pomponi, 2018
- Callyspongia (Cladochalina) armigera (Duchassaing & Michelotti, 1864)
- Callyspongia (Cladochalina) asparagus (Lamarck, 1814)
- Callyspongia (Cladochalina) aspericornis (Lamarck, 1814)
- Callyspongia (Cladochalina) diffusa (Ridley, 1884)
- Callyspongia (Cladochalina) fibrosa (Ridley & Dendy, 1886)
- Callyspongia (Cladochalina) foliacea (Esper, 1797)
- Callyspongia (Cladochalina) glomerata (Whitelegge, 1897)
- Callyspongia (Cladochalina) johannesthielei Van Soest & Hooper, 2020
- Callyspongia (Cladochalina) longissima (Duchassaing & Michelotti, 1864)
- Callyspongia (Cladochalina) manus Lendenfeld, 1887
- Callyspongia (Cladochalina) orieminens Pulitzer-Finali, 1982
- Callyspongia (Cladochalina) pergamentacea (Ridley, 1881)
- Callyspongia (Cladochalina) plancella (Lamarck, 1814)
- Callyspongia (Cladochalina) plicifera (Lamarck, 1814)
- Callyspongia (Cladochalina) rautenfeldi (Topsent, 1928)
- Callyspongia (Cladochalina) robusta sensu Tanita & Hoshino, 1989
- Callyspongia (Cladochalina) samarensis (Wilson, 1925)
- Callyspongia (Cladochalina) spinifera (Carter, 1887)
- Callyspongia (Cladochalina) spinilamella (Dendy, 1889)
- Callyspongia (Cladochalina) spinosissima (Dendy, 1887)
- Callyspongia (Cladochalina) subarmigera (Ridley, 1884)
- Callyspongia (Cladochalina) tenerrima Duchassaing & Michelotti, 1864
- Callyspongia (Cladochalina) thurstoni (Burton, 1930)

=== Subgenus Callyspongia (Euplacella) Lendenfeld, 1887 ===
- Callyspongia (Euplacella) australis (Lendenfeld, 1887)
- Callyspongia (Euplacella) biru de Voogd, 2004
- Callyspongia (Euplacella) communis (Carter, 1881)
- Callyspongia (Euplacella) densa (Keller, 1889)
- Callyspongia (Euplacella) mollissima (Lendenfeld, 1887)
- Callyspongia (Euplacella) paralia Ilan, Gugel & van Soest, 2004
- Callyspongia (Euplacella) pulvinata (Lindgren, 1897)

=== Subgenus Callyspongia (Toxochalina) Ridley, 1884 ===
- Callyspongia (Toxochalina) dendyi (Burton, 1931)
- Callyspongia (Toxochalina) difficilis (Brøndsted, 1924)
- Callyspongia (Toxochalina) fenestrata (Desqueyroux-Faúndez, 1984)
- Callyspongia (Toxochalina) folioides (Bowerbank, 1875)
- Callyspongia (Toxochalina) multiformis (Pulitzer-Finali, 1986)
- Callyspongia (Toxochalina) murata (Ridley, 1884)
- Callyspongia (Toxochalina) oliveri (Kirk, 1911)
- Callyspongia (Toxochalina) pseudofibrosa (Desqueyroux-Faúndez, 1984)
- Callyspongia (Toxochalina) pseudotoxa Muricy & Ribeiro, 1999
- Callyspongia (Toxochalina) ridleyi (Dendy, 1905)
- Callyspongia (Toxochalina) robusta (Ridley, 1884)
- Callyspongia (Toxochalina) schulzei (Kieschnick, 1900)
- Callyspongia (Toxochalina) staminea (Desqueyroux-Faúndez, 1984)
- Callyspongia (Toxochalina) superba (Lendenfeld, 1887)
- Callyspongia (Toxochalina) ternatensis (Kieschnick, 1896)

=== Subgenus unassigned ===
- Callyspongia abnormis Pulitzer-Finali, 1993
- Callyspongia altera Wiedenmayer in Hooper & Wiedenmayer, 1994
- Callyspongia annulata (Ridley & Dendy, 1886)
- Callyspongia arcesiosa Laubenfels, 1936
- Callyspongia ariakensis Tanita, 1968
- Callyspongia aurantiaca (Lendenfeld, 1887)
- Callyspongia azurea Fromont, 1995
- Callyspongia bathami Bergquist & Warne, 1980
- Callyspongia bispicula Tanita, 1961
- Callyspongia brondstedi Van Soest & Hooper, 2020
- Callyspongia brucei Pulitzer-Finali, 1982
- Callyspongia californica Dickinson, 1945
- Callyspongia calyx (Keller, 1889)
- Callyspongia capricorni Pulitzer-Finali, 1982
- Callyspongia carens Pulitzer-Finali, 1982
- Callyspongia clathrata (Dendy, 1905)
- Callyspongia clavata (Keller, 1889)
- Callyspongia claviformis (Kieschnick, 1896)
- Callyspongia compressa (Carter, 1885)
- Callyspongia confoederata (sensu Ridley, 1884)
- Callyspongia conica (Lendenfeld, 1887)
- Callyspongia contorta Pulitzer-Finali, 1993
- Callyspongia conulosa (Kieschnick, 1900)
- Callyspongia coppingeri (Ridley, 1881)
- Callyspongia crassa (Keller, 1889)
- Callyspongia crassifibra (Dendy, 1889)
- Callyspongia cylindrica (Lendenfeld, 1886)
- Callyspongia doorae (Brøndsted, 1934)
- Callyspongia ecklonia Hoshino, 1981
- Callyspongia elastica (Kieschnick, 1898)
- Callyspongia erecta (Kieschnick, 1898)
- Callyspongia euplax (Lendenfeld, 1887)
- Callyspongia exigua (Lendenfeld, 1887)
- Callyspongia fistularis (Topsent, 1892)
- Callyspongia flabellata Burton, 1932
- Callyspongia flabelliformis Tanita, 1968
- Callyspongia flammea Desqueyroux-Faúndez, 1984
- Callyspongia fragilis (Kieschnick, 1898)
- Callyspongia fructicosa Desqueyroux-Faúndez, 1984
- Callyspongia fungosa Wiedenmayer in Hooper & Wiedenmayer, 1994
- Callyspongia fusifera (Thiele, 1905)
- Callyspongia globosa Pulitzer-Finali, 1982
- Callyspongia hirta Pulitzer-Finali, 1993
- Callyspongia hispidoconulosa Desqueyroux-Faúndez, 1984
- Callyspongia hospitalis (Stephens, 1915)
- Callyspongia implexa (Topsent, 1892)
- Callyspongia incrustans (Row, 1911)
- Callyspongia inflata Duchassaing & Michelotti, 1864
- Callyspongia irregularis Bergquist & Warne, 1980
- Callyspongia joubini (Topsent, 1897)
- Callyspongia kelleri Van Soest & Hooper, 2020
- Callyspongia laboreli Hechtel, 1983
- Callyspongia latituba (Dendy, 1924)
- Callyspongia laxa (Lendenfeld, 1887)
- Callyspongia ligulata (Whitelegge, 1901)
- Callyspongia lindgreni Van Soest & Hooper, 2020
- Callyspongia lobata (Ridley, 1884)
- Callyspongia macrodactyla (Ridley, 1884)
- Callyspongia maculata (Keller, 1889)
- Callyspongia mammillata (Burton, 1933)
- Callyspongia megalorrhaphis (Ridley & Dendy, 1886)
- Callyspongia mollis (Lendenfeld, 1887)
- Callyspongia mollis (Schmidt, 1870)
- Callyspongia murex Hoshino, 1981
- Callyspongia muricina (Lamarck, 1814)
- Callyspongia osculata (Lendenfeld, 1887)
- Callyspongia pambanensis Rao, 1941
- Callyspongia parva Desqueyroux-Faúndez, 1984
- Callyspongia patula Hoshino, 1981
- Callyspongia perforata Pulitzer-Finali, 1993
- Callyspongia peroni (Topsent, 1932)
- Callyspongia persculpta Wiedenmayer, 1989
- Callyspongia poculum (Carter, 1885)
- Callyspongia polymorpha Desqueyroux-Faúndez, 1984
- Callyspongia psammophera de Laubenfels, 1954
- Callyspongia pseudoreticulata Desqueyroux-Faúndez, 1984
- Callyspongia raphidiophora (Lendenfeld, 1887)
- Callyspongia relicta Wiedenmayer in Hooper & Wiedenmayer, 1994
- Callyspongia reticulata (Keller, 1889)
- Callyspongia ridleyi Burton, 1934
- Callyspongia rigida Desqueyroux-Faúndez, 1984
- Callyspongia rubiginosa (Schmidt, 1870)
- Callyspongia septimaniensis Griessinger, 1971
- Callyspongia sinuosa (Topsent, 1892)
- Callyspongia siphonopsis (Lendenfeld, 1887)
- Callyspongia sphaericuslobata (Hoshino, 1981)
- Callyspongia spiculifera (Whitelegge, 1901)
- Callyspongia spinimarginata Desqueyroux-Faúndez, 1984
- Callyspongia spinulosa (Lendenfeld, 1887)
- Callyspongia stalagmitis (Lendenfeld, 1887)
- Callyspongia stellata Bergquist & Warne, 1980
- Callyspongia subcornea (Griessinger, 1971)
- Callyspongia subtilis (Schmidt, 1870)
- Callyspongia taupea (Tanita & Hoshino, 1989)
- Callyspongia tenuis Thum, 1903
- Callyspongia toxifera Wiedenmayer, 1989
- Callyspongia trichita Pulitzer-Finali, 1982
- Callyspongia truncata (Lendenfeld, 1887)
- Callyspongia tuberculata (Lendenfeld, 1887)
- Callyspongia tubulifera (Lindgren, 1897)
- Callyspongia vasseli (Keller, 1889)
- Callyspongia velum (Lendenfeld, 1888)
- Callyspongia vincentina Wiedenmayer in Hooper & Wiedenmayer, 1994
- Callyspongia violacea Pulitzer-Finali, 1993
- Callyspongia viridis (Dendy, 1895)
- Callyspongia waguensis Tanita, 1961
