= Callystatin A =

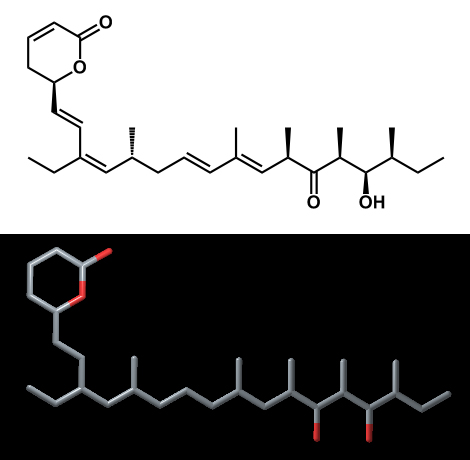

Names
- Preferred IUPAC name (6R)-6-[(1E,3Z,5R,7E,9E,11R,13S,14R,15S)-3-Ethyl-14-hydroxy-5,9,11,13,15-pentamethyl-12-oxoheptadeca-1,3,7,9-tetraen-1-yl]-5,6-dihydro-2H-pyran-2-one
- Other names (−)-Callystatin A

Identifiers
CAS Number	189883-16-7
3D model (JSmol)	Interactive image
ChEBI	CHEBI:435273
ChEMBL	ChEMBL200899
ChemSpider	4581330
KEGG	C16891
MeSH	A (-)-Callystatin A
PubChem CID	5471086
UNII	ZLK7N2R2D6
CompTox Dashboard (EPA)	DTXSID501029737
- InChI: InChI=1S/C29H44O4/c1-8-22(5)28(31)24(7)29(32)23(6)18-20(3)12-10-13-21(4)19-25(9-2)16-17-26-14-11-15-27(30)33-26/h10-12,15-19,21-24,26,28,31H,8-9,13-14H2,1-7H3/b12-10+,17-16+,20-18+,25-19-/t21-,22+,23-,24+,26-,28-/m1/s1 Key: QPJTWGLLJWBDQW-KMMMXHTBSA-N
- SMILES: CC[C@H](C)[C@H]([C@H](C)C(=O)[C@H](C)/C=C(\C)/C=C/C[C@@H](C)/C=C(/CC)\C=C\[C@H]1CC=CC(=O)O1)O

Properties
Chemical formula	C_{29}H_{44}O_{4}
Molar mass	456.6573 g/mol
Density	1.022 g/cm^{3}
Boiling point	622 °C (1,152 °F; 895 K) at 760 mmHg

Hazards
Flash point	196 °C (385 °F; 469 K)
- Except where otherwise noted, data are given for materials in their standard state (at 25 °C [77 °F], 100 kPa). verify (what is ?) Infobox references

Callystatin A is a polyketide natural product from the leptomycin family of secondary metabolites. It was first isolated in 1997 from the marine sponge Callyspongia truncata which was collected from the Goto Islands in the Nagasaki Prefecture of Japan by the Kobayashi group. Since then its absolute configuration has been elucidated and callystatin A was discovered to have anti-fungal and anti-tumor activities with extreme potency against the human epidermoid carcinoma KB cells (IG_{50} = 10 pg/ml) and the mouse lymphocytic leukemia Ll210 cells (IG_{50} = 20 pg/ml).

== Overview ==
Kobayashi et al. isolated callystatin A in 1997 from the marine sponge Callyspongia truncata using acetone extraction. This marine sponge was discovered near the Goto Islands of the Nagasaki Prefecture in Japan. Kobayashi also reported the isolation of callystatin A from another marine sponge Stelletta sp. and an unidentified marine tunicate, both of which were collected at the same site as Callyspongia truncata. It is possible that there is a symbiotic relationship among these microorganisms which can explain their biosynthesis of callystatin A.

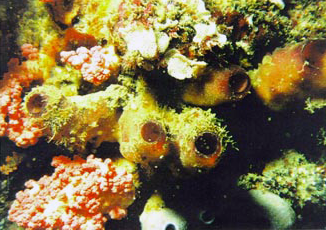
Callyspongia truncata

The leptomycin family of molecules that callystatin belongs to includes several well-known molecules with cytotoxic properties. such as leptomycins A and B, anguinomycins A and B, kazusamycin, and leptofuranins A-D. All of these molecules were isolated from various strains of Streptomyces sp. and share a common structural motif consisting of a terminal α,β-unsaturated lactone group attached to a long unsaturated fatty acid chain which includes two diene systems separated by two sp^{3}-hybridized carbons. It is believed that this highly conserved structural motif is important for biological target recognition with the α,β-unsaturated lactone moiety serving as the pharmacophore of the molecule.

== Mechanism of Action ==
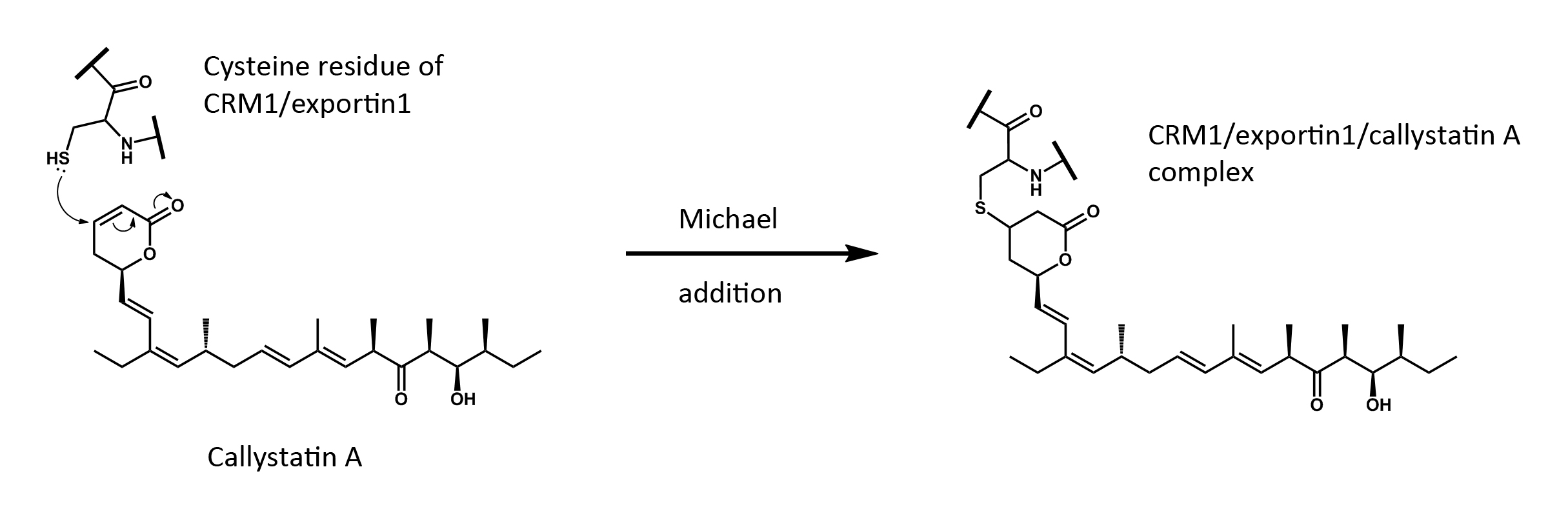
Figure 2. Mechanism of inhibition by Callystatin A

Aside from sharing the same absolute stereochemistry as leptomycin B, callystatin A was discovered to have similar biological activity with leptomycin B as well. The anti-tumor activity of leptomycin B and callystatin A arises because many NES-cargo molecules blocked by these antibiotics are those involved in the cellular processes of proliferation, differentiation, and development, learning and memory, and hormone action. These molecules include regulatory proteins such as Rev, MAPK/MEK1, c-Abl, Cyclin B1, MDM2/p53, IkB, MPF, and PKA.

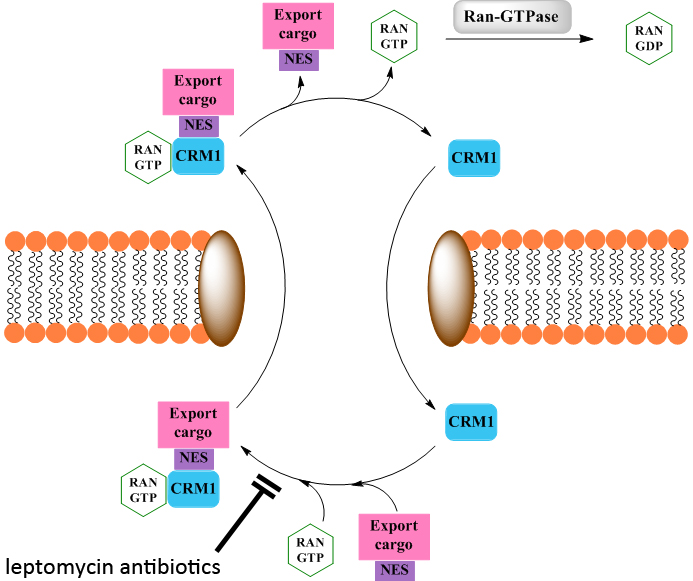
Figure 3. Schematic of inhibition of NES-dependent nuclear transport by leptomycin class compounds

The most important role of leptomycin B is its inhibitory effect on the NES-dependent nuclear export mechanism, leading to the cell cycle arrest during G1 and G2 phases in eukaryotic cells. In wild-type cells, macromolecules in the nucleus with the leucine-rich nuclear export signal (NES) can be transported to the cytoplasm by binding to a karyopherin protein called chromosome region maintenance 1 (CRM1)/exportin 1. This CRM1/exportin1/NES-cargo interaction is stabilized by Ran-GTP binding which forms a complex that can transport the cargo to the cytoplasm. There, the cargo will be released when the Ran-GTP protein is hydrolyzed by a cytoplasmic Ran-GTPase enzyme to form Ran-GDP. This step completes the transport process and CRM1/exportin1 reenters the nucleus for more cargo binding. Leptomycin B and callystatin A inhibit the action of CRM1/exportin1 by a likely Michael-type addition of the thiol group from a cysteine residue of CRM1/exportin1 to form a covalent bond. This interaction prevents CRM1/exportin1 from recognizing and binding the NES of the cargo molecules because it occurs within the same binding site. Thus, macromolecules intended to be transported out of the nucleus will accumulate there instead.

== Biosynthesis ==
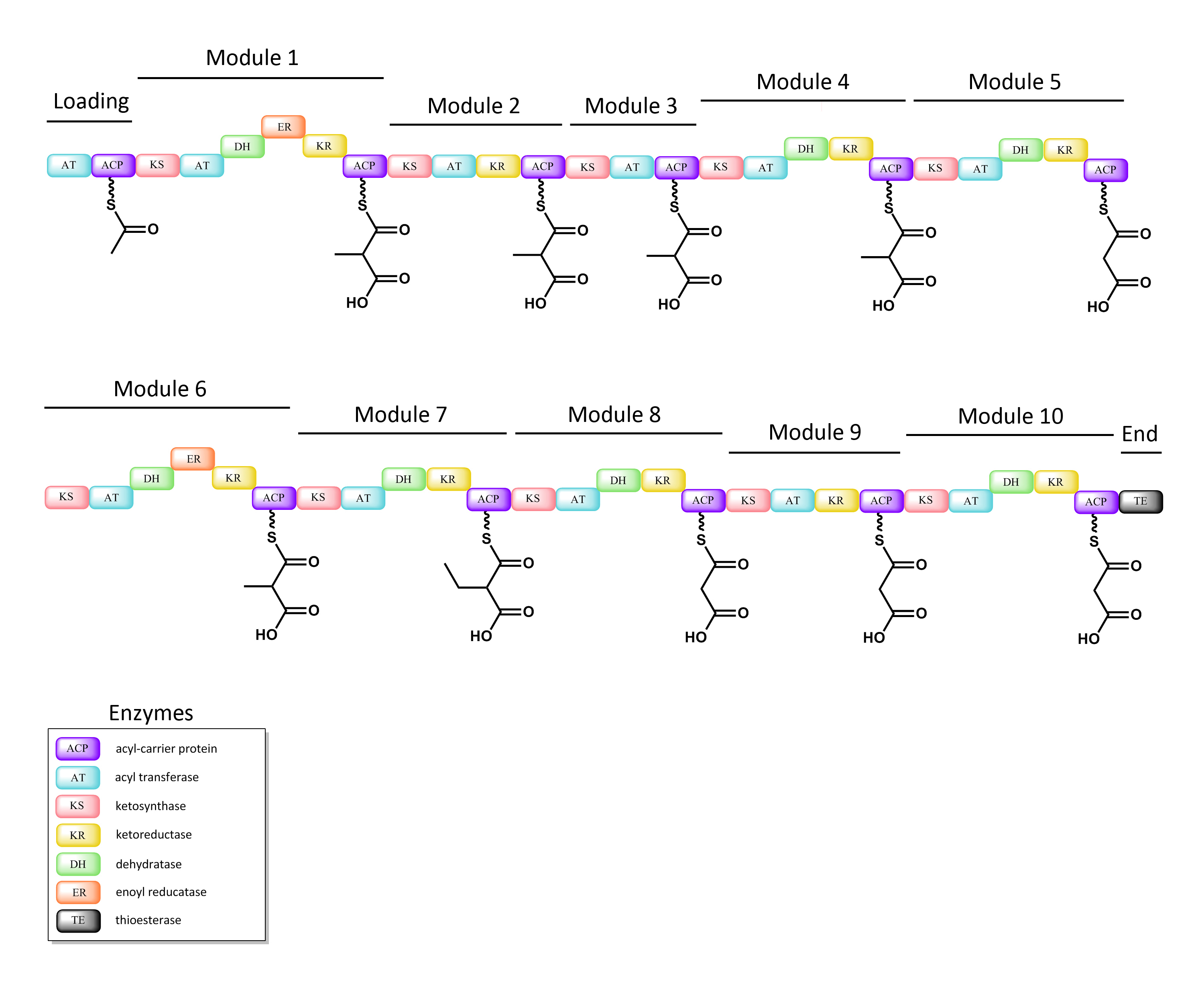
Figure 4. Modular arrangement of PKS enzyme complex for Callystatin A

Although the biosynthetic pathway of callystatin A has not been explicitly described, its polyketide structure indicates that the pathway must involve the polyketide synthase (PKS) enzyme complex. In general, in a modular fashion, an acetate starting unit in the loading module is extended by two carbons each time by the ketosynthase (KS) domain. The acyl groups are loaded onto the acyl carrier protein (ACP) with the help of the acyltransferase (AT) domain. Each module contains different combinations of the ketoreductase (KR), dehydratase (DH), and enoyl reductase (ER) domains that can modify and tailor the two-carbon subunits to form the resulting fatty acid chain. The final module contains a thioesterase (TE) domain that hydrolyzes the thioester bond to release the fatty acid chain and coenzyme A.

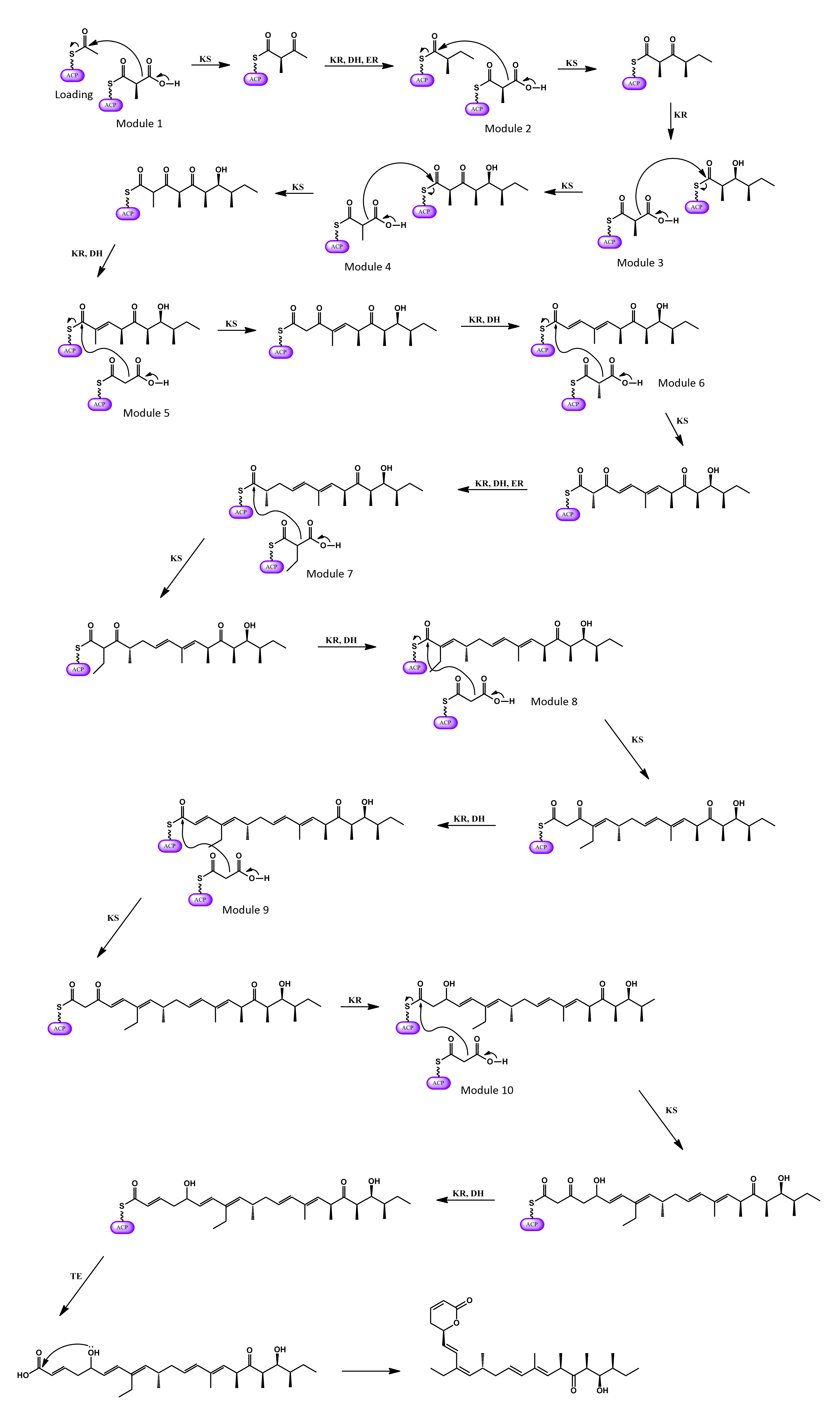
Figure 5. Mechanism of synthesis of Callystatin A

In the same manner, callystatin A biosynthesis starts with an acetate unit and elongates by either the malonate or the methyl malonate extender units, depending on the specific module. An exception to this is in module 7 where an ethyl malonate molecule replaces the other two options as the extender unit. It is assumed that the stereochemistry results from the activity of the domains and the absolute configuration is specified by the overall PKS complex. After being released from the thioesterase domain as a long fatty acid chain, the characteristic α,β-unsaturated lactone moiety is formed through a lactonization step to result in the final structure.

== Total Synthesis ==
The total synthesis of callystatin A has been reported by various groups since its discovery in 1997. These total syntheses vary in their approaches and strategies.

== See also ==
- Leptomycin
- Polyketide synthase
- Nuclear export signal
- Selinexor - synthetic nuclear export inhibitor
