= Calcifibrospongiidae =

Scientific classification
- Kingdom: Animalia
- Phylum: Porifera
- Class: Demospongiae
- Order: Haplosclerida
- Family: Calcifibrospongiidae

Family of sponges

Calcifibrospongiidae is a family of sponges belonging to the order Haplosclerida. The order Haplosclerida is distinguished by isodictyal skeleton (mesh shaped fibres). In general, Porifera are basal animals with bodies full of pores and channels. Calcifibrospongiidae includes the species Calcifibrospongia actinostromarioides. There have only been ten recorded occurrences of this species: in Hogsty Reef and San Salvador, as well as in the subtropics of the Bahamas.

== Description ==
Calcifibrospongiidae are sclerosponges, with a basal skeleton made out of calcium carbonate, which encloses the sponge tissue. Sclerosponge skeletons are polyphyletic, causing this family to be classified because of its spicule skeleton. Sclerosponges are relict forms of sponges that originated from Paleozoic groups. They have derived from two possible sources; the first being from the demosponges during the Paleozoic and in recent ages diverged into several other groups or from lineages of demosponges that came together through hypercalcification.

The sponge is orange in color, hard, and possesses an encrusting plate. The sponge is described to be tannish-orange underwater in ambient light and reddish-orange at surface level. It is mushroom-shaped, with a smooth surface. It is covered in oscules which are regularly scattered to provide a means for water to pass through. Additionally, the organism's spicules are siliceous strongyles and reticulate in shape. The siliceous strongyles are held together by spongin fibres and the calcareous skeleton sits around this structure. This skeleton supports the soft parts of the sponge.

== Life History ==
Calcifibrospongiidae are hermaphroditic, meaning they contain both male and female reproductive organs. They reproduce sexually, whereby the spermatocysts escape from the sponge via the osculum. Sponges of the same species then capture the sperm and transport them to the eggs of the sponge via archaeocytes. Fertilization takes place in the mesenchyme of the sponge. They then produce zygotes that develop into free-swimming parenchymella larvae. These larvae then settle on a substrate and grow into their adult sponge form.

The sponge is sciaphilous, which means it is tolerant of shade. To date, the shallowest specimen found was collected on a reef at Acklins island in the Bahamas at a depth of 30 m (98 ft) by W.M. Goldberg. It was described as large (60–90 cm (20–40 in) across and 30 cm (10 in) high). The largest specimen found was found 1.6 km (1 mi) south of Lucaya, Grand Bahama at 77 m (253 ft) in depth.

Calcifibrospongiidae feed through filter feeding. They transfer nutrients that are suspended in the water surrounding them and filter out the nutrients they do not want. Poriferans feed on plankton and organic particles.

It has not been recorded whether or not Calcifibrospongiidae are able to move, although the larvae are motile.
