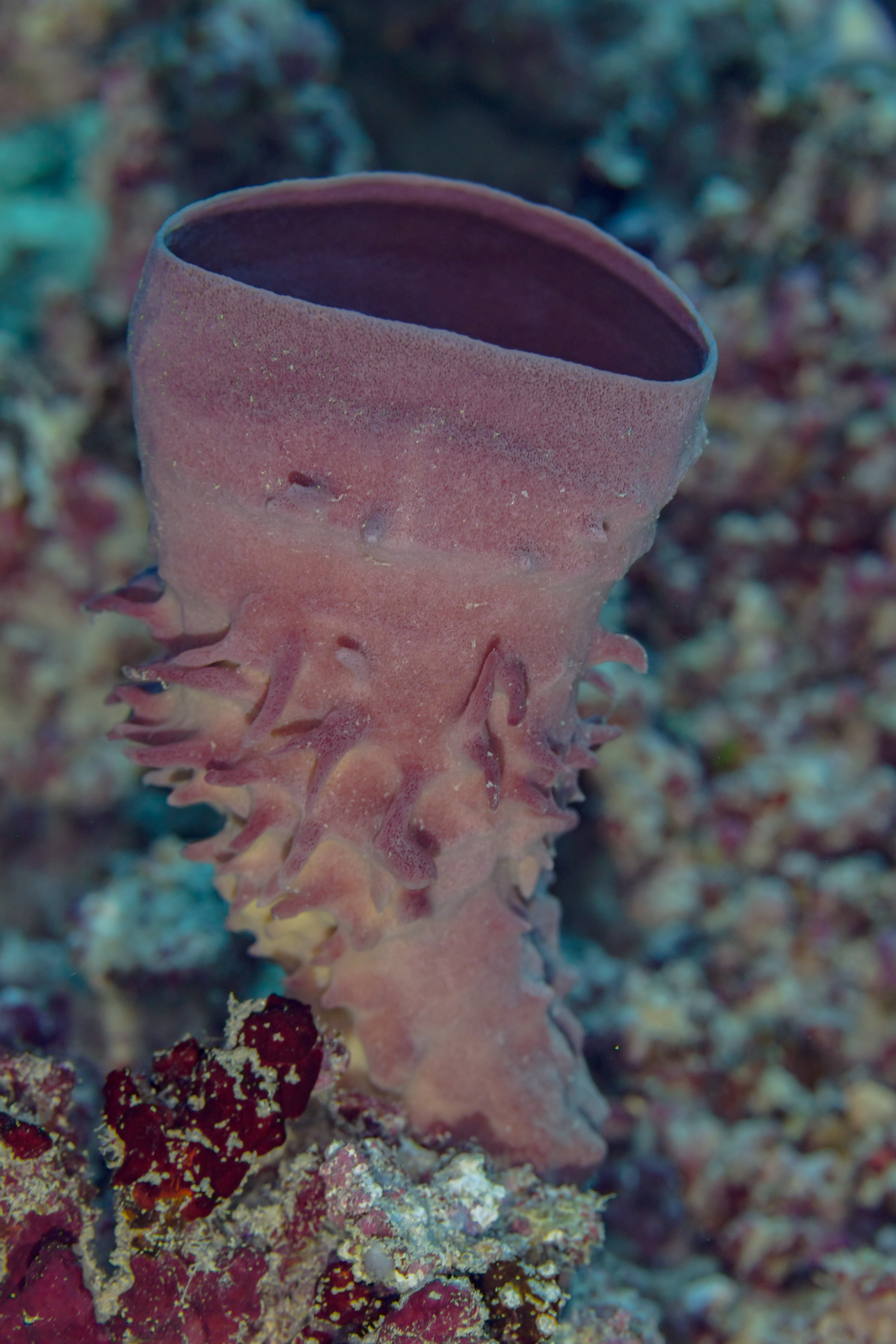

Scientific classification
- Kingdom: Animalia
- Phylum: Porifera
- Class: Demospongiae
- Order: Haplosclerida
- Family: Callyspongiidae
- Genus: Callyspongia
- Species: C. crassa

Binomial name
- Callyspongia crassa Keller, 1889

Synonyms
- Sclerochalina crassa Keller, 1889

= Callyspongia crassa =

Species of sponge

Callyspongia crassa, commonly known as prickly tube-sponge, is a species of sponge found from the Red Sea to the Seychelles. Its wide flexible brown tube with exterior protuberances can appear as a single tube or as clusters of tubes and can reach up to 50 centimeters (20 inches) in size. Like many other sea sponges, it is primarily used for marine drugs as they have many bioactive components and properties. They also play an important role in marine reef and benthic communities, as they constantly filter water and act as habitats for smaller organisms. As sea sponges, they have the ability to reproduce both sexually and asexually.

== Naming and taxonomy ==
The name crassa derives from the Latin word crassus meaning solid, thick, fat, or dense. Its common name, the prickly tube-sponge, comes from its physical appearance as it is a tube sponge and it is nearly completely covered in spines. It was previously named Sclerochalina crassa, but was eventually moved to the genus Callyspongia.

The genus Callyspongia belongs to the family Callyspongiidae. This family contains four genera: Arenosclera, Callyspongia, Dactylia, and Siphonochalina with Callyspongia being the largest and containing over 180 species. They are under the phylum Porifera, making them a sponge. Specifically, they are Demosponges, which is the most diverse class in the phylum Porifera.

== Description ==
The prickly tube-sponge is a large, flexible, brown, sometimes red, tube that can be found as a singular tube or as a cluster. It has been known to reach up to 50 centimeters (~20 inches) with specimens as small as 2 mm having been found, but it typically has an average diameter of 30 centimeters (~12 inches). Most of its surface is covered with spines or spine-like protrusions which tend to taper away towards the upper part of the tube.

== Gallery ==
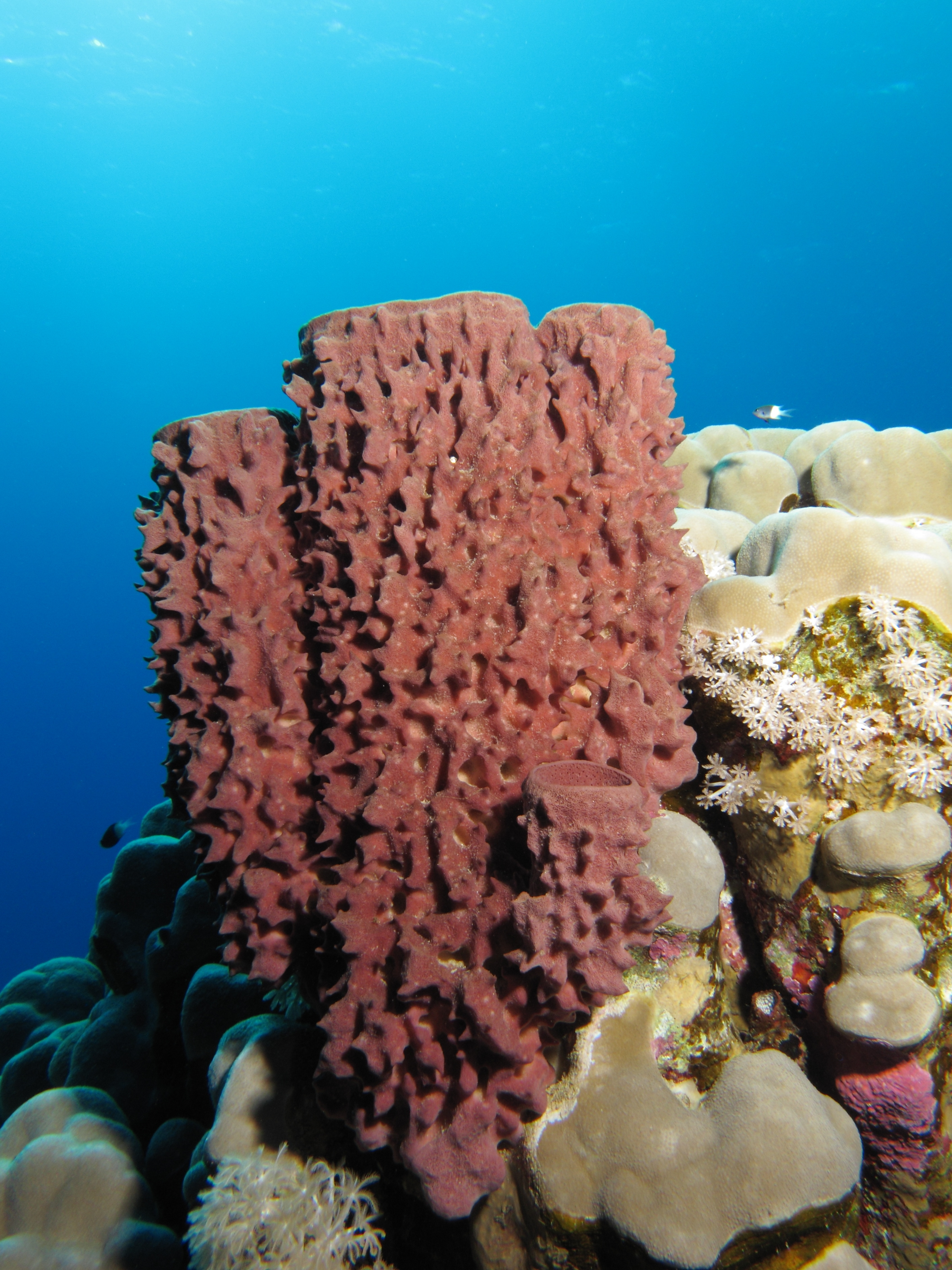

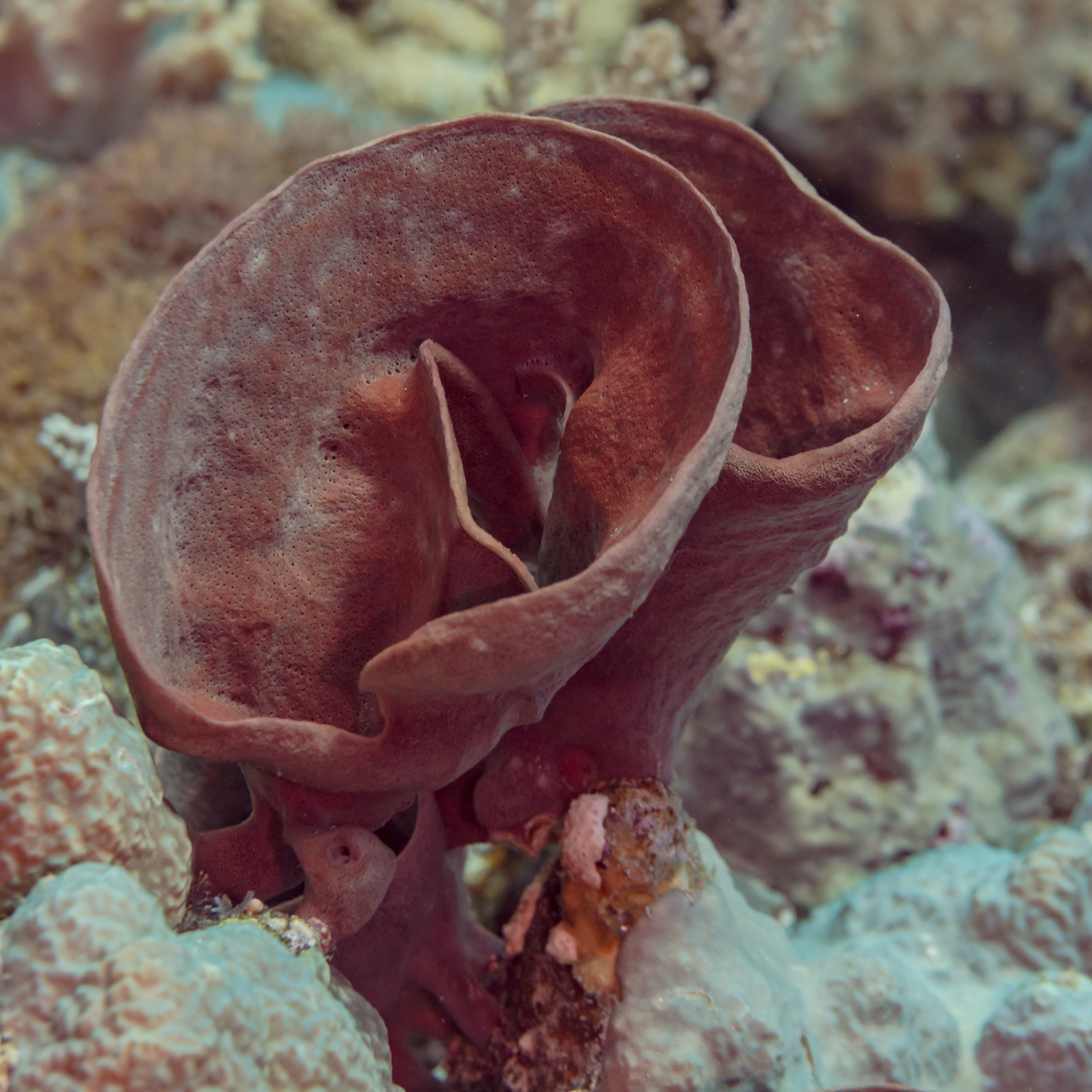

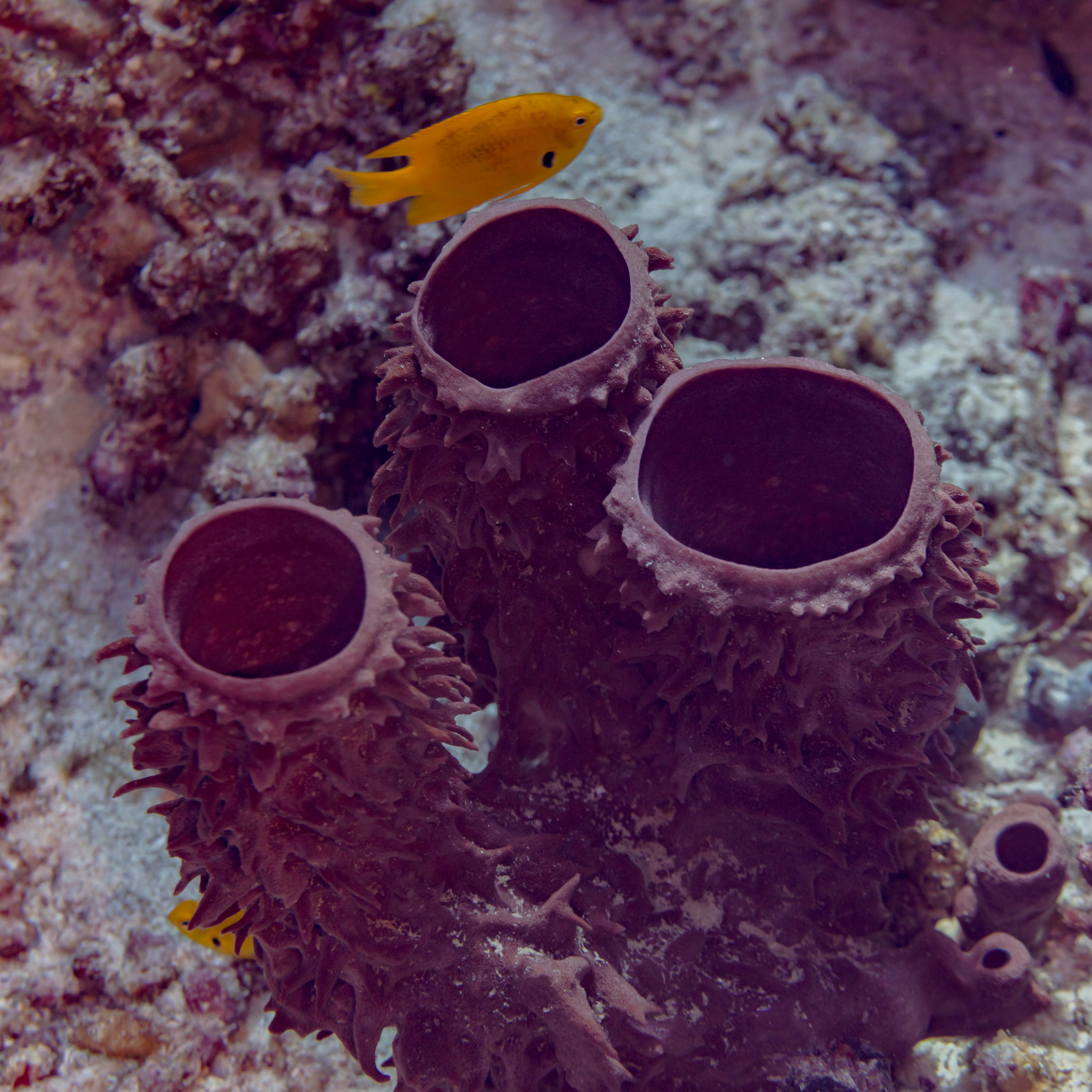

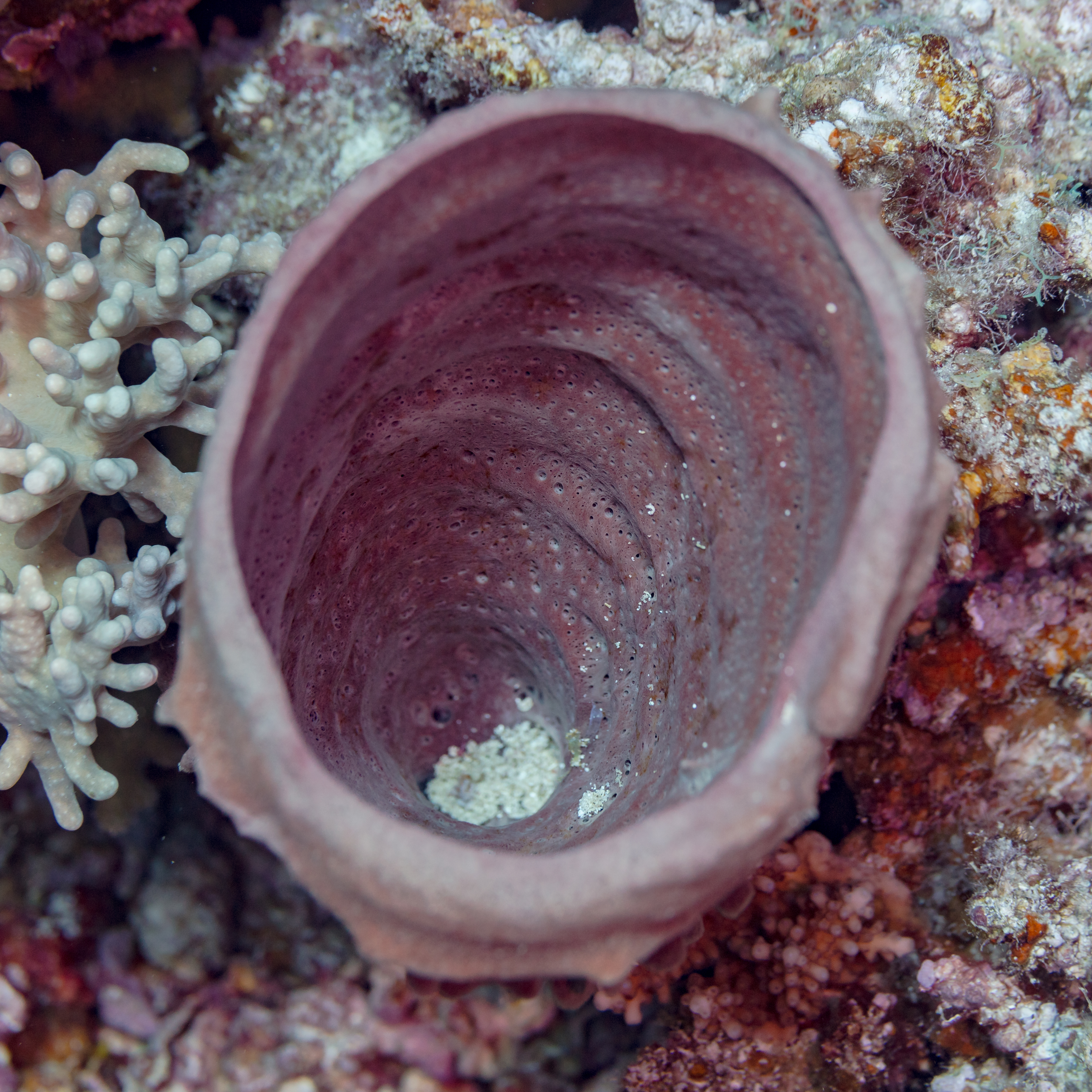

== Human use and ecosystem relevance ==
Humans mainly use these sponges for marine drugs. Many species of sponge are used for marine drugs due to their bioactive components, many of which are used for antiseptic agents. Callyspongia crassa has over 20 compounds with anti-inflammatory and anti-microbial properties, among others, which contribute to its various medical uses.

Sea sponges are also of important use in the wild. They play an important role in nutrient recycling and in filtering the water which is useful for many of the reefs that they live in as clearer water makes sunlight more accessible for photosynthesizing organisms in the same area. Many sponges also serve as a habitat for a variety of other organisms. They can serve as microhabitats, with conditions different from the larger surrounding area. Tube sponges specifically, often have small fish and other inhabitants living inside of the tubes.

== Ecology ==
=== Habitat ===
These sponges are native to the Red Sea. Samples have been found in the southern Red Sea off the coasts of Sudan and Eritrea and in the northern Red Sea in the Gulf of Aqaba at Eilat. They are known to live in marine reef and marine benthic habitats, relatively close to shore. They have been found between a depth of 1–30 m, but they are more abundant at deeper depths (15–30 m). They live in waters with high salinity and warm temperatures, with water in the Red Sea never dropping below 21 °C (70 °F).

=== Feeding ===
Callyspongia crassa are filter feeders and suspension feeders, but they mainly filter feed. They filter feed because they lack true tissues and organs, so they can not have a digestive system similar to other animals. This sponge filter feeds by taking in water towards the base, filtering it to get the nutrients and food, and then expelling the leftover water out through the osculum. They are omnivores as their diet consists of both small plants and animals.

=== Reproduction ===
Sea sponges can reproduce both sexually and asexually. They often switch between the two seasonally, to best grow their populations and take up space on the reef.
