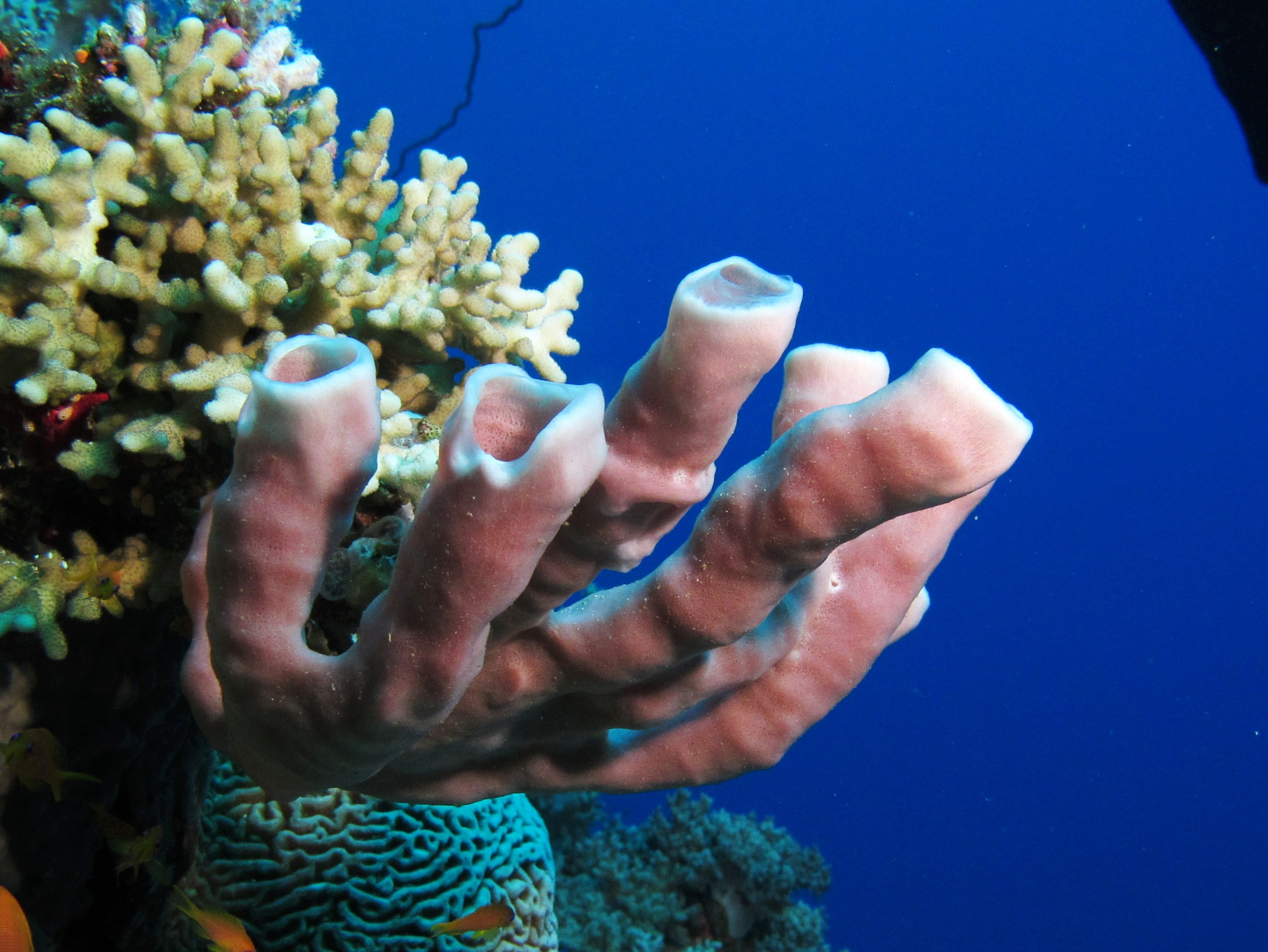
- Callyspongia siphonella

Scientific classification
- Kingdom: Animalia
- Phylum: Porifera
- Class: Demospongiae
- Order: Haplosclerida
- Family: Callyspongiidae de Laubenfels, 1936

Genera
- See text

= Callyspongiidae =

Family of sponges

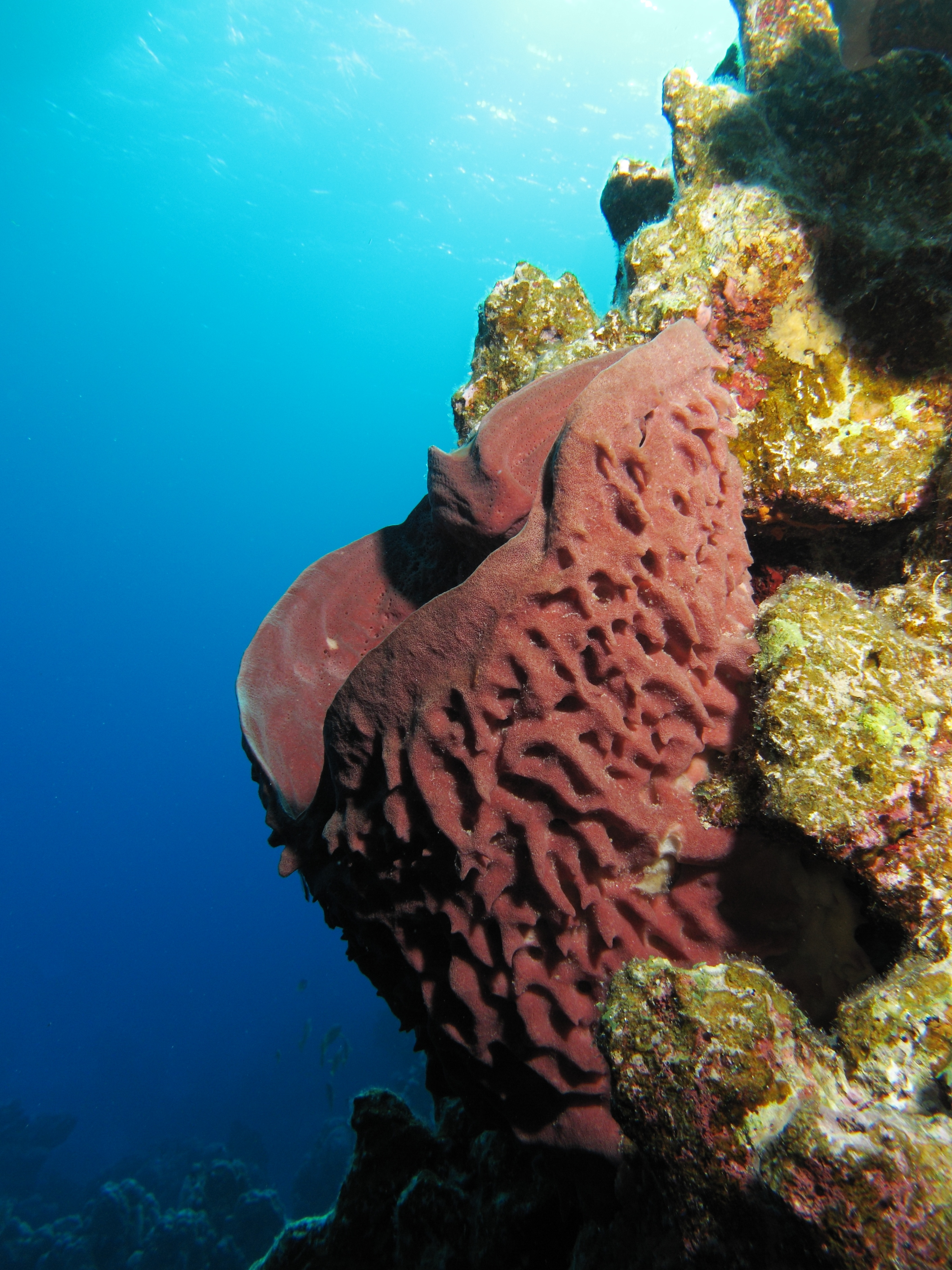
Callyspongia crassa

Callyspongiidae is a family of sea sponges in the order Haplosclerida. It contains the following genera and species:

- Arenosclera Pulitzer-Finali, 1982
  - Arenosclera amazonensis Leal, Moraes, Thompson & Hajdu, 2017
  - Arenosclera arabica (Keller, 1889)
  - Arenosclera brasiliensis Muricy & Ribeiro, 1999
  - Arenosclera digitata (Carter, 1882)
  - Arenosclera heroni Pulitzer-Finali, 1982
  - Arenosclera klausi Leal, Moraes, Thompson & Hajdu, 2017
  - Arenosclera parca Pulitzer-Finali, 1982
  - Arenosclera rosacea Desqueyroux-Faúndez, 1984
- Callyspongia Duchassaing & Michelotti, 1864
  - Over 180 species. See genus page for complete list.
- Dactylia Carter, 1885
  - Dactylia australis (Lendenfeld, 1889)
  - Dactylia candelabrum (Lendenfeld, 1889)
  - Dactylia ceratosa (Dendy, 1887)
  - Dactylia clavata (Lendenfeld, 1889)
  - Dactylia crispata (Lamarck, 1814)
  - Dactylia dichotoma (Lendenfeld, 1886)
  - Dactylia elegans (Lendenfeld, 1888)
  - Dactylia illawarra (Lendenfeld, 1889)
  - Dactylia imitans (Lendenfeld, 1886)
  - Dactylia impar Carter, 1885
  - Dactylia radix (Lendenfeld, 1888)
  - Dactylia repens (Carter, 1886)
  - Dactylia syphonoides (Lamarck, 1814)
  - Dactylia varia (Gray, 1843)
- Siphonochalina Schmidt, 1868
  - Siphonochalina asterigena (Schmidt, 1868)
  - Siphonochalina balearica Ferrer-Hernandez, 1916
  - Siphonochalina coriacea Schmidt, 1868
  - Siphonochalina deficiens Pulitzer-Finali, 1982
  - Siphonochalina expansa Sarà, 1960
  - Siphonochalina fortis Ridley, 1881
  - Siphonochalina intersepta (Topsent, 1928)
  - Siphonochalina lyrata (Lamarck, 1814)
