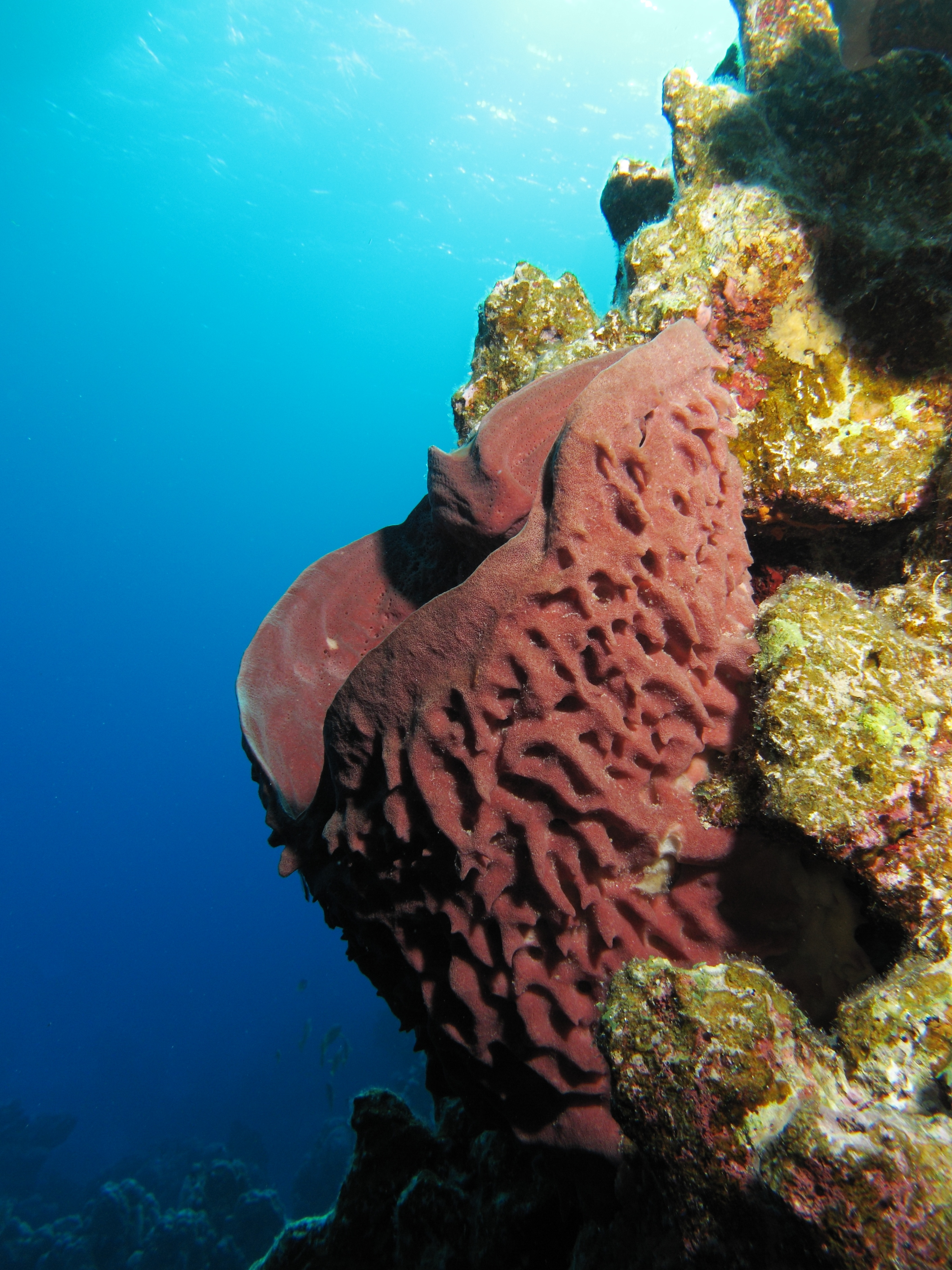
- Callyspongia crassa

Scientific classification
- Kingdom: Animalia
- Phylum: Porifera
- Class: Demospongiae
- Subclass: Heteroscleromorpha
- Order: Haplosclerida; Topsent, 1928

Families
- See text

= Haplosclerida =

Order of sponges

Haplosclerida is an order of demosponges. It contains the following families:

- Calcifibrospongiidae Hartman, 1979
- Callyspongiidae de Laubenfels, 1936
- Chalinidae Gray, 1867
- Niphatidae Van Soest, 1980
- Petrosiidae Van Soest, 1980
- Phloeodictyidae Carter, 1882
