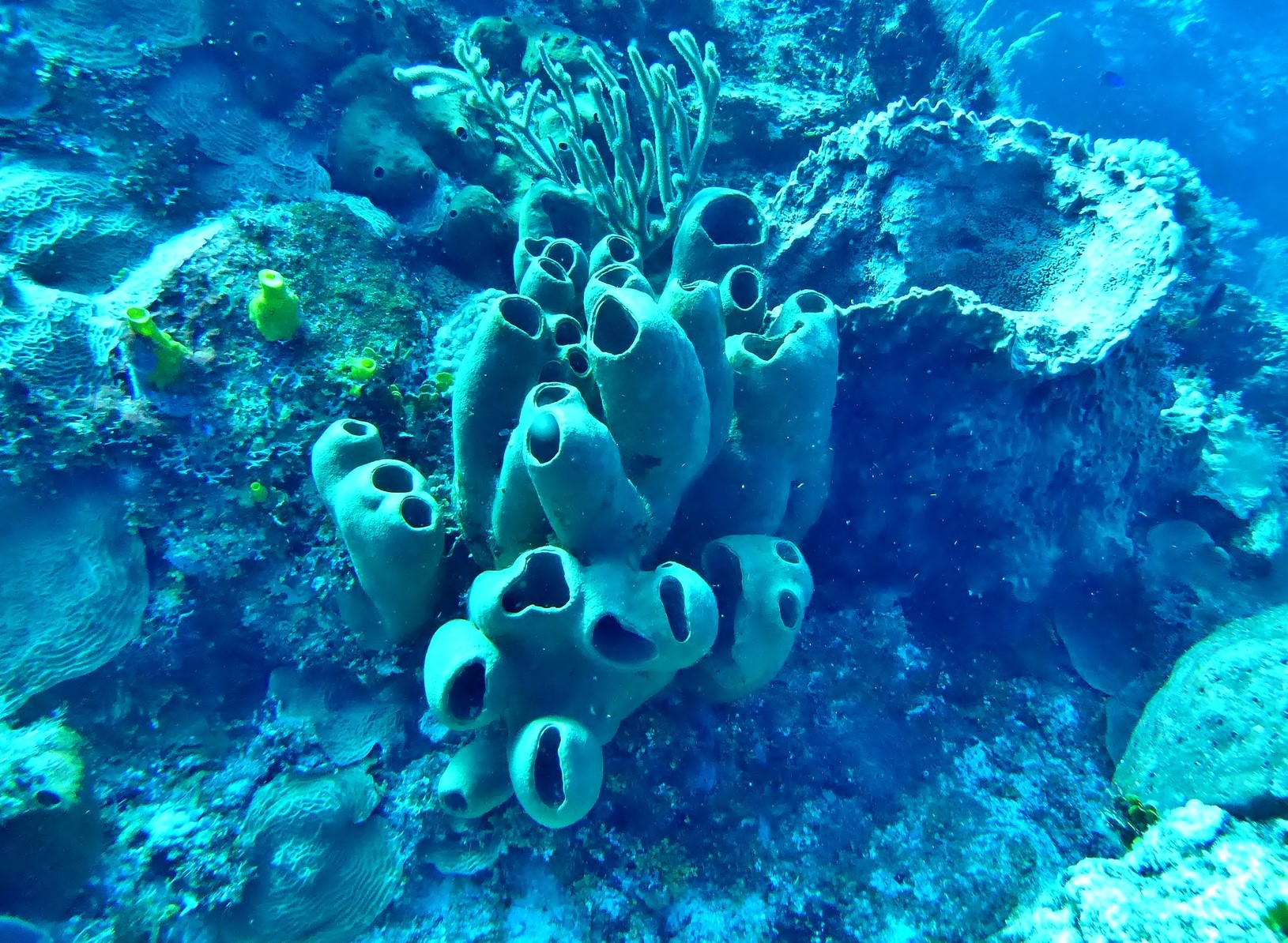

Scientific classification
- Kingdom: Animalia
- Phylum: Porifera
- Class: Demospongiae
- Order: Agelasida
- Family: Agelasidae
- Genus: Agelas
- Species: A. tubulata

Binomial name
- Agelas tubulata Lehnert & van Soest, 1996

= Agelas tubulata =

Species of sponge

Agelas tubulata is a species of demosponge. It is tube-shaped or vase-shaped and variable in colour. It is found in the Caribbean area and along the coasts of Brazil at depths of between about 70 and 90 m (230 and 300 ft). It was first described by Lehnert & Rob van Soest in 1996, the type location being the Greater Antilles.

== Description ==
Agelas tubulata is quite variable in shape and colouring. It usually takes the form of a group of vases or tubes, sometimes fused together, growing directly from a narrow base; it may be tan, orange or pinkish on the outside and orangeish-yellow to orange on the inside. The surface is usually smooth. The spicules are acanthostyles. It resembles Agelas conifera, but that species has a narrower base and some of the tubes branch from the sides of other tubes, sometimes forming antler- or club-shapes. Large solitary specimens of A. tubulata may be barrel-shaped and have deep recesses in the walls; they may resemble Agelas cerebrum, but that species has more regularly arranged recesses with orifices in between. The consistency of this sponge is elastic and compressible and zoanthids are sometimes found growing on the walls. The type specimen was yellowish-orange, 20 cm (8 in) high with a diameter of 5 to 8 cm (2 to 3 in). Larger specimens may be 40 to 60 cm (16 to 24 in) in diameter with tubes 3 to 6 cm (1.2 to 2.4 in) across and 20 to 40 cm (8 to 16 in) long.

== Distribution and habitat ==
This species is known from the Caribbean Sea, the Gulf of Mexico, the east coast of Florida, the Bahamas, Cuba, Jamaica, Panama, Belize and northeastern Brazil. It was discovered in 1993 during exploration of steep fore-reef slopes in the Caribbean Sea at depths between 70 and 90 m (230 and 300 ft). It was first described in 1996 by the German zoologist Helmut Lehnert and the Dutch zoologist Rob van Soest.

== Biology ==
Like other demosponges, this sponge feeds by drawing in water through fine pores on its surface, filtering out the tiny organic particles and bacteria and expelling the excess water through the osculi.

This sponge is a hermaphrodite. The larvae are planktonic and known as parenchymella larvae. These are free-living, and when fully developed settle on the seabed and undergo metamorphosis into the adult form.
