= Ageliferin =

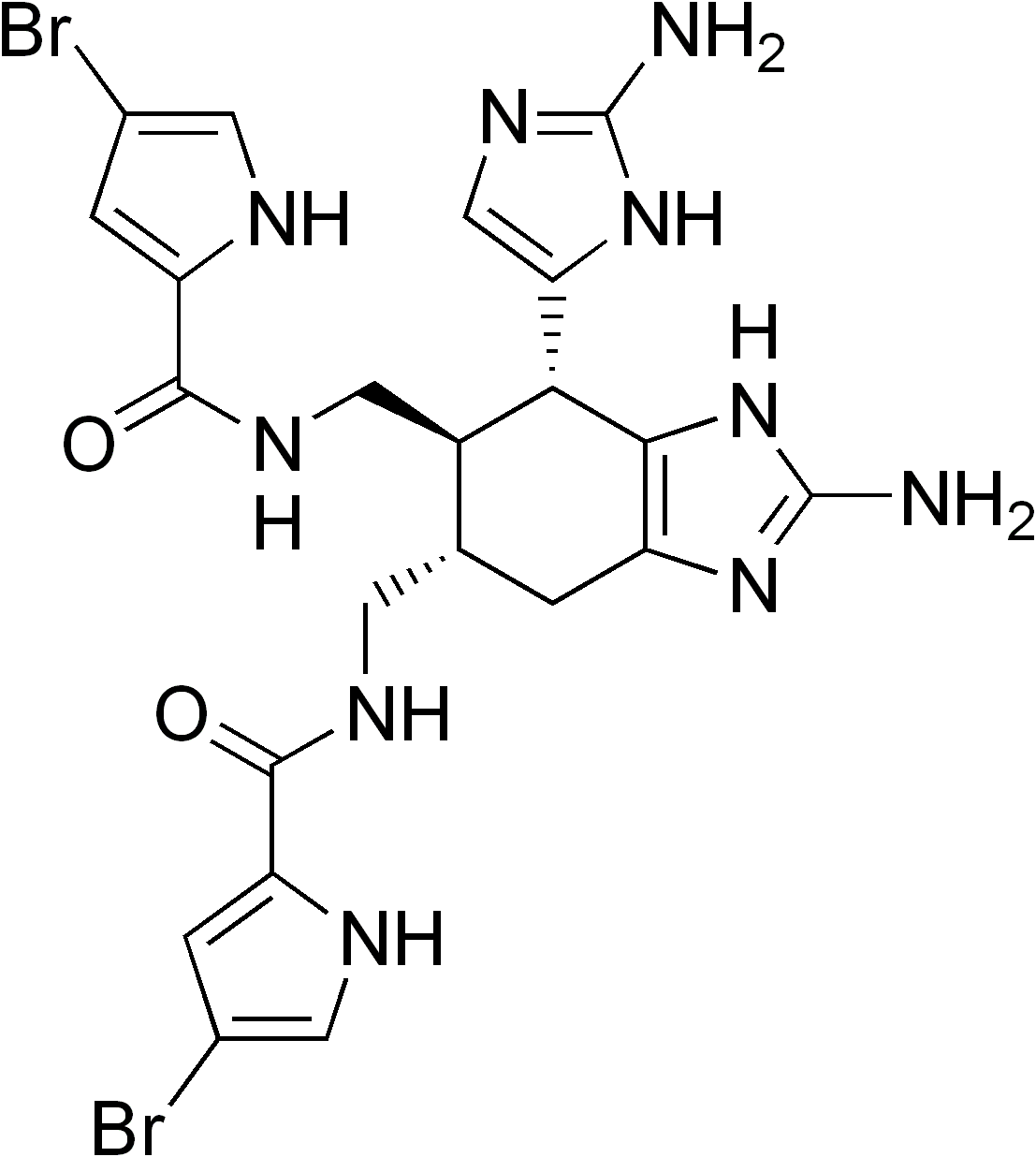

Names
- Preferred IUPAC name N,N′-{[(4R,5R,6S)-2-Amino-4-(2-amino-1H-imidazol-5-yl)-4,5,6,7-tetrahydro-1H-1,3-benzimidazole-5,6-diyl]bis(methylene)}bis(4-bromo-1H-pyrrole-2-carboxamide)
- Other names Ageliferine

Identifiers
CAS Number	117417-64-8
3D model (JSmol)	Interactive image
ChEMBL	ChEMBL502866
ChemSpider	9344613
PubChem CID	11169518
UNII	P4YF5N7VXX
CompTox Dashboard (EPA)	DTXSID40457473
- InChI: InChI=1S/C22H24Br2N10O2/c23-10-2-14(27-5-10)19(35)29-4-9-1-13-18(34-22(26)32-13)17(16-8-31-21(25)33-16)12(9)7-30-20(36)15-3-11(24)6-28-15/h2-3,5-6,8-9,12,17,27-28H,1,4,7H2,(H,29,35)(H,30,36)(H3,25,31,33)(H3,26,32,34)/t9-,12-,17-/m1/s1 Key: DMMLTRAQSJWUHT-OGTWGDGJSA-N; InChI=1/C22H24Br2N10O2/c23-10-2-14(27-5-10)19(35)29-4-9-1-13-18(34-22(26)32-13)17(16-8-31-21(25)33-16)12(9)7-30-20(36)15-3-11(24)6-28-15/h2-3,5-6,8-9,12,17,27-28H,1,4,7H2,(H,29,35)(H,30,36)(H3,25,31,33)(H3,26,32,34)/t9-,12-,17-/m1/s1 Key: DMMLTRAQSJWUHT-OGTWGDGJBG
- SMILES: C1[C@@H]([C@H]([C@@H](C2=C1NC(=N2)N)C3=CN=C(N3)N)CNC(=O)C4=CC(=CN4)Br)CNC(=O)C5=CC(=CN5)Br

Properties
Chemical formula	C_{22}H_{24}Br_{2}N_{10}O_{2}
Molar mass	620.310 g·mol^{−1}
- Except where otherwise noted, data are given for materials in their standard state (at 25 °C [77 °F], 100 kPa). verify (what is ?) Infobox references

Ageliferin is a chemical compound produced by some sponges. It was first isolated from Caribbean and then Okinawan marine sponges in the genus Agelas. It often co-exists with the related compound sceptrin and other similar compounds. It has antibacterial properties and can cause biofilms to dissolve. Total syntheses have been independently accomplished by the research groups of Phil S. Baran at the Scripps Research Institute, Chuo Chen at UT Southwestern Medical Center, Patrick Harran at UCLA, Daisuke Urabe at Toyama Prefectural University,and Evanno Laurent at Université Paris-Saclay.

== See also ==
- Agelas clathrodes
- Agelas conifera
