= Elephant ear =

Elephant ear may literally refer to the ear of an elephant.

It may also refer to:

== Plants ==
- Several genera in the family Araceae (Arums)
  - Alocasia, genus of broad-leaved perennials in tropical & subtropical Asia to Eastern Australia
  - Caladium, ornamental plants with arrowhead-shaped leaves originally from South America
  - Colocasia (taro), a genus of flowering plants native to tropical Polynesia and southeastern Asia
  - Philodendron giganteum, a species of plant found in the Caribbean and South America
  - Xanthosoma, a genus native to tropical America cultivated for their starchy corms
- Burdock, a thistle in the genus Arctium
- Bergenia crassifolia or other plants in genus Bergenia, shade-loving flowering garden plant

== Other uses ==
- Another name for one of several desserts, including a palmier and fried dough
- Gynandrocarpa placenta, genus Gynandrocarpa, a colonial ascidian, sea squirt, found off the Cape Peninsula, South Africa
- Smoke deflectors on steam locomotives may be called "elephant ears" in US railway slang

== See also ==
- Elephant ear sponge (disambiguation)
- Elephant ear tree, Enterolobium cyclocarpum or Macaranga gigantea
- Elephant-ear bamboo, Reynoutria japonica, more commonly known as Japanese knotweed
