= C22H24Br2N10O2 =

The molecular formula C_{22}H_{24}Br_{2}N_{10}O_{2} (molar mass: 620.310 g/mol) may refer to:

- Ageliferin
- Sceptrin
