= Agelas schmidtii =

Scientific classification
- Kingdom: Animalia
- Phylum: Porifera
- Class: Demospongiae
- Order: Agelasida
- Family: Agelasidae
- Genus: Agelas
- Species: A. schmidtii

Binomial name
- Agelas schmidtii Wilson, 1902

Species of sponge

Agelas schmidtii, commonly known as the brown tubular sponge, is a species of demosponge. It occurs at moderate depths in the Gulf of Mexico and the Caribbean Sea and often has a colonial coral growing over the surface. The type locality is Puerto Rico.

== Description ==
The brown tubular sponge is a large sponge forming mounds that may be a metre (yard) across. The base is encrusted on the substrate or may develop lobes but above this there are several dozen large vertical tubes, narrowing at the top, each with a hollow centre or atrium and a large hole or osculum at the apex. They are up to 16 centimetres (6.3 in) long and 8 centimetres (3.1 in) wide and are soft, elastic and resilient. The walls are strengthened by a skeleton of spongin fibres and tiny calcareous spicules. On the side of these tubes there are deep grooves and shallow cup shaped depressions up to 2.5 cm (1 in) across each occupied by a dark reddish brown zoanthid (Parazoanthus sp.). This is a colonial coral living symbiotically with the sponge and the polyps are connected together by tissue called coenenchyme inside the atrium of the sponge. The general colour of the sponge is brownish orange or brick red.

== Distribution and habitat ==
The brown tubular sponge is found in the Caribbean Sea, the Greater Antilles, Puerto Rico, the northern coast of Brazil and the northern part of the Gulf of Mexico. It typically occurs on reefs at depths between 15 and 45 metres (49 and 148 ft) in positions where there is a strong current and the water is clear.

== Biology ==
The brown tubular sponge is a filter feeder. The current flowing over the top of the sponge draws in water through small pores near the base called ostia. These are lined by flagellated cells called choanocytes. The food particles are engulfed by these and the water exits through the osculi. Only very small particles can enter the sponge and 80% of its nourishment comes from bacteria sized particles.

The brown tubular sponge produces a secondary metabolite, sceptrina, an alkaloid with antimicrobial properties.
