= Agelasimine =

Group of chemical compounds

Chemical structure of agelasimine A

Agelasimines are a group of adenine-related bicyclic diterpenoids isolated from the orange sponge Agelas mauritania. Their chemical structures are closely related to the agelasines.

Both groups of compounds display a range of biological activities, such as cytotoxicity, inhibition of adenosine transfer into rabbit erythrocytes (red blood cells), Ca^{2+} channel antagonistic action, α1 adrenergic blockade and others.

Both compounds have been reproduced in the laboratory by organic synthesis.
