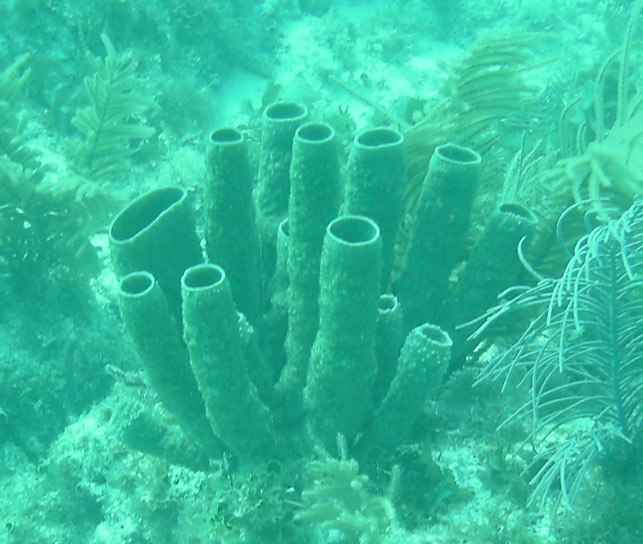

Scientific classification
- Kingdom: Animalia
- Phylum: Porifera
- Class: Demospongiae
- Order: Agelasida
- Family: Agelasidae
- Genus: Agelas
- Species: A. conifera

Binomial name
- Agelas conifera (Schmidt, 1870)

Synonyms
- Chalinopsis conifera Schmidt, 1870

= Agelas conifera =

Species of sponge

Agelas conifera, also known as the brown tube sponge, is a species of sponge. Its color is brown, tan, or greyish brown with a lighter interior. It is common in the Caribbean and Bahamas, and occasional in Florida. Agelas conifera contains bromopyrrole alkaloids, notably sceptrin and oroidin, and levels of these feeding-deterrents increase upon predation. Agelas conifera exhibit a wound response, increasing the production and release of bromopyrrole alkaloids, which appear to also protect against harmful microorganisms.

== Related species ==
- Agelas clathrodes
