= Agelas flabelliformis =

Scientific classification
- Kingdom: Animalia
- Phylum: Porifera
- Class: Demospongiae
- Order: Agelasida
- Family: Agelasidae
- Genus: Agelas
- Species: A. flabelliformis

Binomial name
- Agelas flabelliformis (Carter, 1883)

Synonyms
- Ectyon flabelliformis Carter, 1883

Species of sponge

Agelas flabelliformis, also known as the elephant ear sponge, is a species of demosponge. It takes the form of a large leathery slender flap and is found in the Caribbean area at depths down to 100 metres (330 ft).

== Description ==
The elephant ear sponge consists of a large thin flap of spongy material attached edgewise to the substrate by a short peduncle or stem about 4 centimetres (1.6 in) in diameter. It is usually less than 3 centimetres (1.2 in) thick but may reach a height and width of a metre (yard) or so. There is often a central lobe with two side flaps. The consistency is firm and leathery but also fragile. On one side it has many large, circular osculi (holes) scattered across the surface. On the other side are small pores and a few, widely dispersed, irregular osculi and some groups of smaller ones. Each vent is surrounded by a collar or rim of thickened skin. The tissue forming the sponge is strengthened by the incorporation of a single type of mineralised spicule. These spicules are classified as acanthostyles and consist of curved rods, with one end pointed and with whorls of spines on the shaft. The spicules are embedded in the sponge's tissues where they form a mesh-like, interlocking skeleton. The colour of this sponge is yellowish-brown, fawn or dark brown, sometimes with pale edges and it is said to resemble a piece of tanned cow-hide. It is similar in appearance to Agelas dispar but can be distinguished from that species by the size and shape of the spicules in its skeleton.

== Distribution ==
The elephant ear sponge grows on rocks in the eastern Caribbean Sea and the Bahamas. The depth range is normally 15 to 100 metres (49 to 328 ft) but it is found at shallower depths in caves.

== Biology ==
Like other sponges, the elephant ear sponge feeds by drawing water in through its pores, filtering out the bacteria and other fine organic particles and expelling the water through the osculi.

Sponges are unable to defend themselves physically from predators but many have developed chemicals that make them distasteful to fish. The tissues of this sponge contain several secondary metabolites, two of which have been shown to have immunosuppressive properties.
