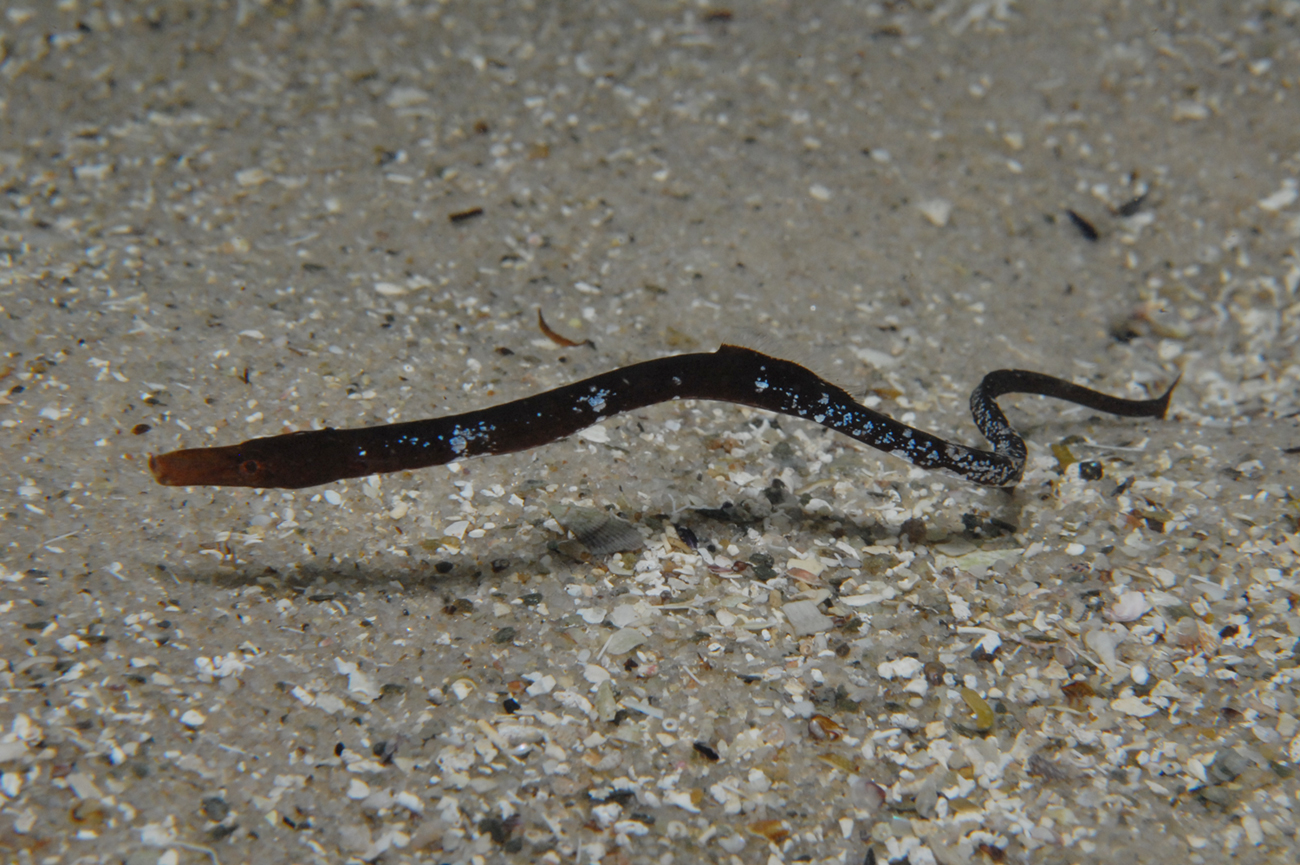
- Histiogamphelus briggsii

Scientific classification
- Kingdom: Animalia
- Phylum: Chordata
- Class: Actinopterygii
- Order: Syngnathiformes
- Family: Syngnathidae
- Subfamily: Syngnathinae
- Genus: Histiogamphelus; McCulloch, 1914

Type species
- Histiogamphelus briggsii McCulloch, 1914

= Histiogamphelus =

Genus of fishes

Histiogamphelus is a genus of fish known as the crested pipefishes. They belong to the family Syngnathidae and are endemic to the southern coast of Australia and Tasmania. They have a characteristic "crest" on the snout, which can help distinguish them from other related genera within the sub-family Syngnathinae. Their brown-tan coloration may mimic the Posidonia sea grass in which they are often found. Like all syngnathids, the male broods the eggs in a brood pouch (in this genus located under the tail).

== Species ==
There are currently two recognized species in this genus:

- Histiogamphelus briggsii McCulloch, 1914 (Briggs' pipefish)
- Histiogamphelus cristatus W. J. Macleay, 1881 (Macleay's crested pipefish)
