= Agelas gracilis =

Scientific classification
- Domain: Eukaryota
- Kingdom: Animalia
- Phylum: Porifera
- Class: Demospongiae
- Order: Agelasida
- Family: Agelasidae
- Genus: Agelas
- Species: A. gracilis

Binomial name
- Agelas gracilis Whitelegge, 1897

Species of sponge

Agelas gracilis, commonly known as candy cane sponge, is a species of demosponge. It lives primarily in Australian waters. It has a symbiotic relationship with the white zoanthid making red and white polyps.
