= Elephant ear sponge =

Elephant ear sponge may refer to sponges:

- Agelas clathrodes, orange elephant ear sponge
- Agelas flabelliformis, elephant ear sponge
- Ianthella basta, elephant ear sponge
- Stylissa carteri, elephant ear sponge
