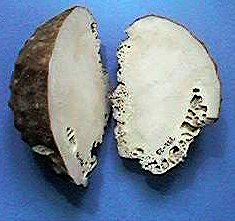
- Ceratoporella

Scientific classification
- Kingdom: Animalia
- Phylum: Porifera
- Class: Demospongiae
- Order: Agelasida
- Family: Astroscleridae; Lister, 1900

= Astroscleridae =

Family of sponges

Astroscleridae is a family of sponges belonging to the order Agelasida.

Genera:

- Astrosclera Lister, 1900
- Ceratoporella Hickson, 1912
- Cooperaria Finks, 1995
- Goreauiella Hartman, 1969
- Hispidopetra Hartman, 1969
- Parastrosclera Wu, 1991
- Spumisclera Wu, 1991
- Stromatospongia Hartman, 1969
