= Agelas dispar =

Scientific classification
- Kingdom: Animalia
- Phylum: Porifera
- Class: Demospongiae
- Order: Agelasida
- Family: Agelasidae
- Genus: Agelas
- Species: A. dispar

Binomial name
- Agelas dispar Duchassaing & Michelotti, 1864

Synonyms
- Agelas clavaeformis (Carter, 1883); Agelas sparsus (Gray, 1867); Agelas sparsus var. clavaeformis (Carter, 1883); Ectyon clavaeformis Carter, 1883; Ectyon sparsus Gray, 1867; Ectyon sparsus var. clavaeformis Carter, 1883

Species of sponge

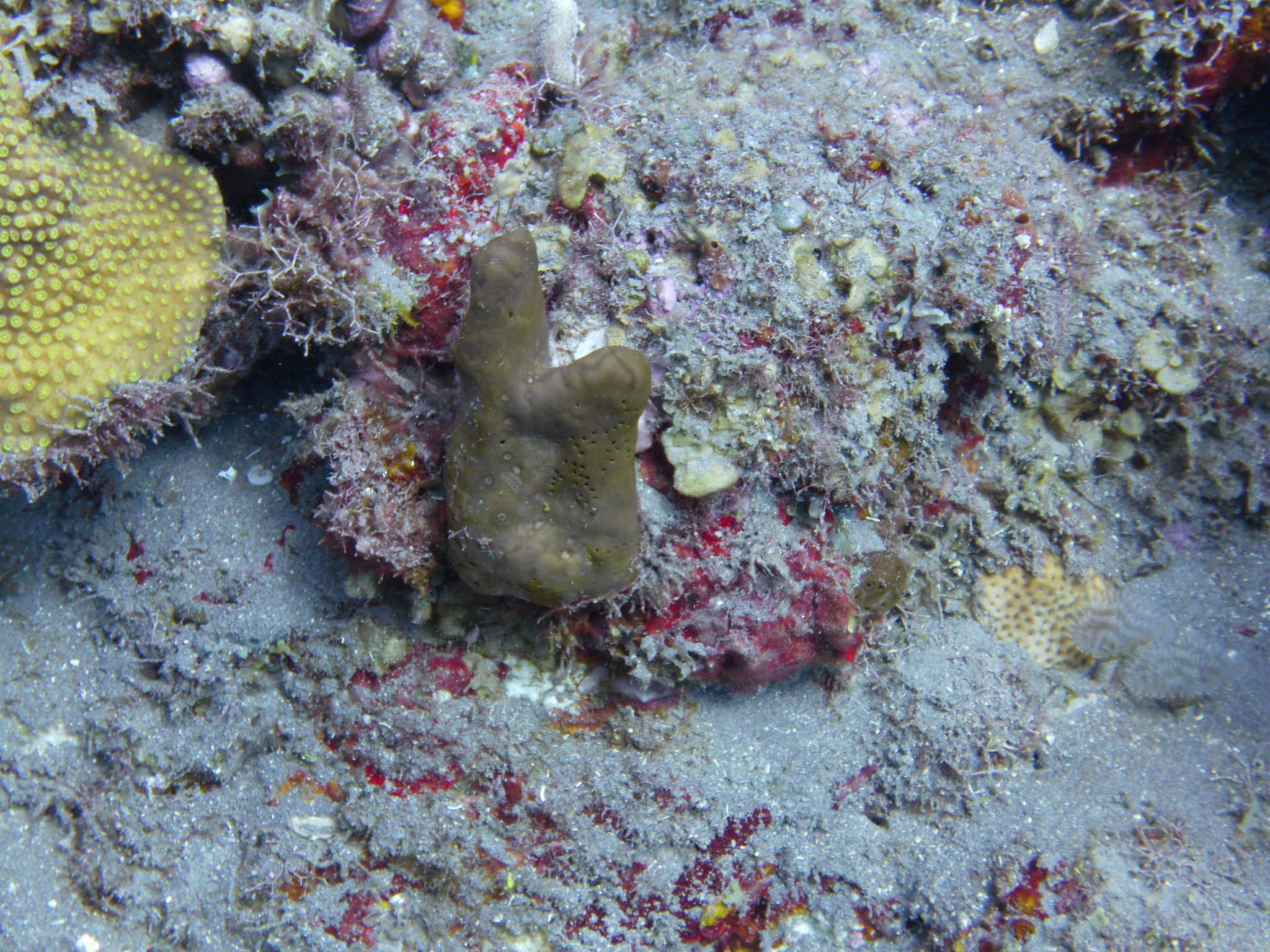
Angelas dispar sighted in Saba, Caribbean

Agelas dispar is a species of demosponge in the family Agelasidae. It lives on shallow-water reefs in the Caribbean Sea and around the West Indies.

== Taxonomy ==
Agelas dispar is the type species of the genus and was first described in 1864 by the French naturalist Édouard Placide Duchassaing de Fontbressin and the Italian naturalist Giovanni Michelotti. They deposited the holotype in Amsterdam. In 1932, the zoologists M. Burton and H.S. Rao, unaware that the holotype was still in existence, deposited a neotype in the Natural History Museum in London, but this specimen has since disappeared.

== Description ==
Agelas dispar forms massive irregularly-shaped, sometimes bulbous mounds or may be encrusting. It can grow to as much as 30 cm (12 in) across. The consistency is spongy but firm; the surface is smooth with many exhalent pores of irregular shape and size, often in shallow pits. The colour externally is pinkish-brown, reddish-brown or deep brown. Internally there are large cavities, many primary canals 2 to 8 mm (0.1 to 0.3 in) across and narrow secondary canals. There is a fibrous, tightly-meshed skeleton made of spongin with ascending and tangential fibres. The spicules consist of bundles of acanthostyles (one end blunt, one end pointed and covered with 7 to 12 whorls of spines).

== Distribution ==
Agelas dispar is found in the Caribbean Sea and around the West Indies; its preferred habitat is shallow-water reefs.
