= Agelasine =

Chemical compound

Chemical structure of agelasine A

Agelasines are 7,9-dialkylpurinium salts isolated from marine sponges (Agelas sp.). They are considered secondary metabolites. Their contribution to the sponge is assumed to be some sort of protection against microorganisms. At the present time a total of eleven 9-methyladeninium salts, agelasine A–I, epiagelasine C and agelin B, are known. All compounds carry a diterpenoid side chain in the adenine 7-position. The agelasines are closely related in structure with the agelasimines.

Chemists have reproduced (−)-agelasine A, (−)-agelasine B, (−)-agelasine E, (−)-agelasine F, and (+)-agelasine D by organic synthesis.

Agelasines are associated with bioactivities such as antimicrobial and cytotoxic effects, as well as contractive responses of smooth muscles and inhibition of Na/K-ATPase (NaKATPase). Furthermore, in vitro activity against Mycobacterium tuberculosis is reported for agelasine F.
