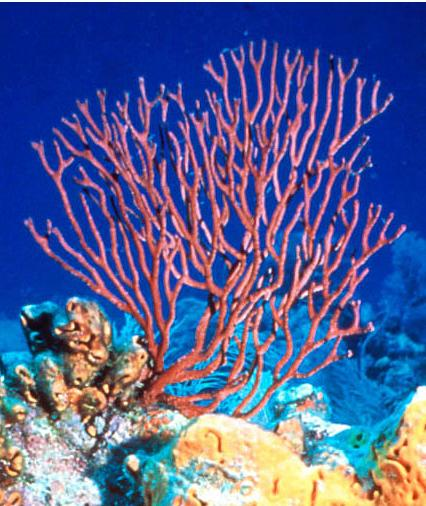
- Iciligorgia schrammi

Scientific classification
- Kingdom: Animalia
- Phylum: Cnidaria
- Subphylum: Anthozoa
- Class: Octocorallia
- Order: Malacalcyonacea
- Family: Melithaeidae
- Genus: Iciligorgia; Duchassaing, 1870

Synonyms
- Blepharogorgia Duchassaing & Michelotti, 1864; Semperina Kölliker, 1870; Suberia

= Iciligorgia =

Genus of corals

Iciligorgia is a genus of soft coral in the family Melithaeidae. It was formerly placed in family Anthothelidae.

== Species ==
The following species are recognized:

- Iciligorgia australis (Broch, 1916)
- Iciligorgia boninensis Aurivillius, 1931
- Iciligorgia brunnea (Nutting, 1911)
- Iciligorgia koellikeri (Studer, 1878)
- Iciligorgia querciformis (Nutting, 1911)
- Iciligorgia rubra (Kölliker, 1870)
- Iciligorgia schrammi Duchassaing, 1870
