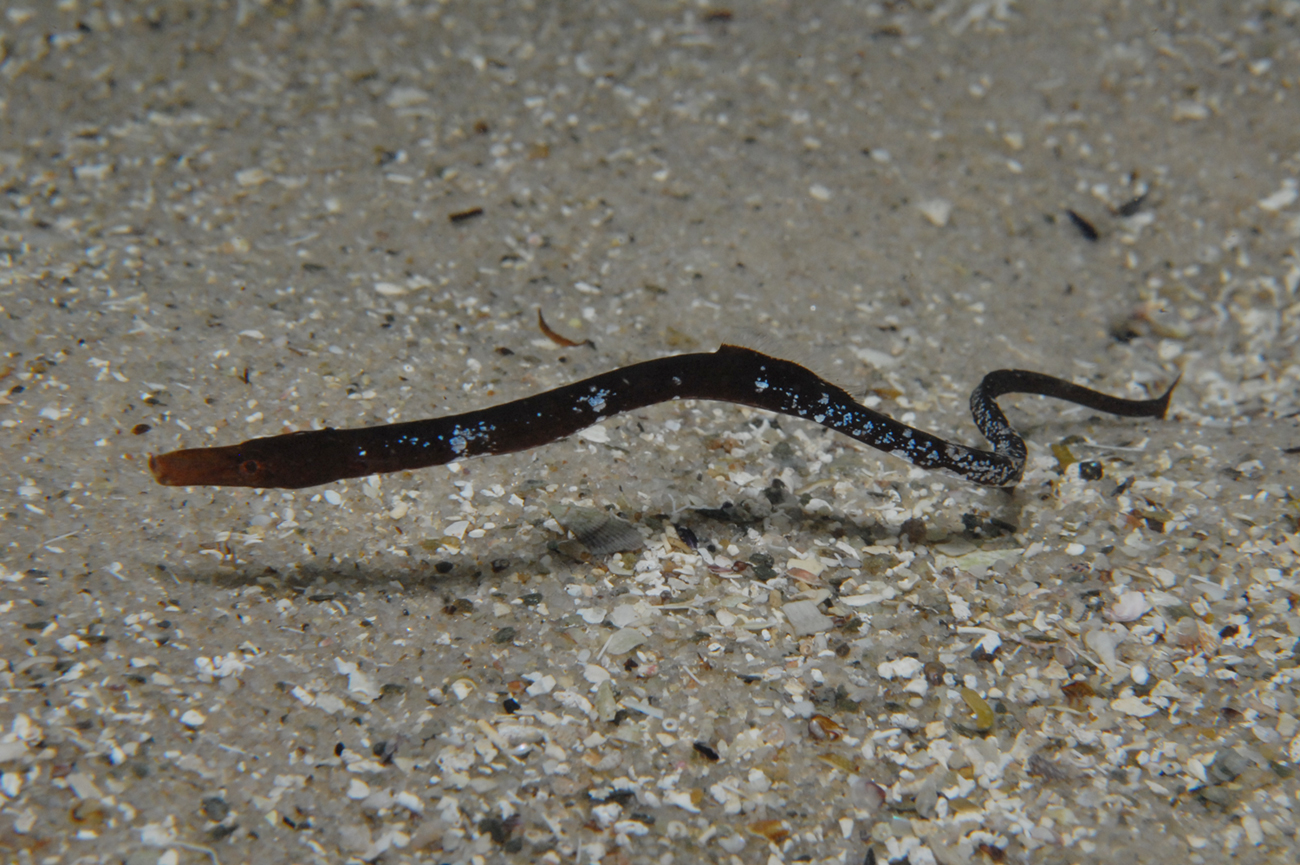

Conservation status
- Least Concern (IUCN 3.1)

Scientific classification
- Kingdom: Animalia
- Phylum: Chordata
- Class: Actinopterygii
- Order: Syngnathiformes
- Family: Syngnathidae
- Genus: Histiogamphelus
- Species: H. briggsii

Binomial name
- Histiogamphelus briggsii McCulloch, 1914

= Histiogamphelus briggsii =

Species of fish

Histiogamphelus briggsii, also known as Brigg's pipefish or crested pipefish (among others), is a species of marine fish in the family Sygnathidae. It can be found in the shallow waters (up to 30 m (98 ft) in depth) surrounding South Australia, Victoria, New South Wales, and Northern Tasmania. Its habitat can consist of reefs, seagrass beds, and sandy beach and estuarine environments Individuals of this species can grow to lengths of 25 cm (9.8 in). They are an ovoviviparous species, in which males brood eggs and give birth to live young.
