= Agelas citrina =

Scientific classification
- Kingdom: Animalia
- Phylum: Porifera
- Class: Demospongiae
- Order: Agelasida
- Family: Agelasidae
- Genus: Agelas
- Species: A. citrina

Binomial name
- Agelas citrina Gotera & Alcolado, 1987

Species of sponge

Agelas citrina, the citron sponge, is a species from the genus Agelas. It was first described by Gotera & Alcolado in 1987.
