= Hymerhabdiidae =

Scientific classification
- Domain: Eukaryota
- Kingdom: Animalia
- Phylum: Porifera
- Class: Demospongiae
- Order: Agelasida
- Family: Hymerhabdiidae

Family of sponges

Hymerhabdiidae is a family of sponges belonging to the order Agelasida.

Genera:

- Hymerhabdia Topsent, 1892
- Prosuberites Topsent, 1893
