= Oroidin =

Names
- Preferred IUPAC name N-[(2E)-3-(2-Amino-1H-imidazol-5-yl)prop-2-en-1-yl]-4,5-dibromo-1H-pyrrole-2-carboxamide

Identifiers
CAS Number	34649-22-4
3D model (JSmol)	Interactive image
ChemSpider	4880362
PubChem CID	6312649
UNII	PF75E92XKM
CompTox Dashboard (EPA)	DTXSID001020635
- InChI: InChI=1S/C11H11Br2N5O/c12-7-4-8(18-9(7)13)10(19)15-3-1-2-6-5-16-11(14)17-6/h1-2,4-5,18H,3H2,(H,15,19)(H3,14,16,17)/b2-1+ Key: QKJAXHBFQSBDAR-OWOJBTEDSA-N; InChI=1/C11H11Br2N5O/c12-7-4-8(18-9(7)13)10(19)15-3-1-2-6-5-16-11(14)17-6/h1-2,4-5,18H,3H2,(H,15,19)(H3,14,16,17)/b2-1+ Key: QKJAXHBFQSBDAR-OWOJBTEDBG
- SMILES: C1=C(NC(=C1Br)Br)C(=O)NC/C=C/C2=CNC(=N2)N

Properties
Chemical formula	C_{11}H_{11}Br_{2}N_{5}O
Molar mass	389.051 g·mol^{−1}
- Except where otherwise noted, data are given for materials in their standard state (at 25 °C [77 °F], 100 kPa). Infobox references

Oroidin is a bromopyrrole alkaloid, originally isolated from marine sponges in the genus Agelas. It appears to have a wide range of biological activities, which makes Oroidin a potential drug candidate for various diseases. It also serves as chemical defense in marine sponges.

== Occurrence and properties ==
Oroidin is a secondary metabolite extracted from marine sponges. It belongs to the pyrrole-2-aminoimidazole structural class, which is a family of marine alkaloids with many secondary metabolites in marine sponges. These compounds show unique structural complexity and exclusively studied biological activities.

Oroidin was first extracted from marine sponge Agelas in 1971. Studies later found that Oroidin is present in other genera of sponges, such as Hymeniacidon, Cymbaxinella, Axinella.

The relatively simple structure and lower molecular mass of Oroidin compared to other pyrrole-2-aminoimidazoles makes Oroidin suitable for chemical optimization. Researchers have synthesized many Oroidin derivatives to improve the biological activities. Adding additional side chains and/or functional groups gives many possibilities for new natural derivatives. Those derivatives can also arise through dimerization of the parent Oroidin system. Specifically, the polycyclic property of Oroidin helps build diverse polycyclic natural metabolites. Combinations of pyrrolic building blocks and different cyclization dimerization fashions produce these polycyclic derivatives. However, details of the biosynthesis of these derivatives still remain unclear.

== Biological activities ==
Oroidin analogues have anticancer, antiparasitic, and antibiofilm activities and therefore are a potential drug candidate for cancers, parasitic infections, and biofilm.

=== Cancer ===
Oroidin analogues have the modified structure of the original. Analogues with increasing number of carbon atoms in the alkane component of the molecule show higher cytotoxicity than the original molecule towards cancer cells, making the analogs a promising anticancer drug candidate. Oroidin analogues appear to inhibit the growth of colon cancer cells the most, but the precise mechanism remains unclear.

Oroidin further helps cancer treatment development by inhibiting multidrug resistance (MDR) activity. MDR possess resistance to anticancer agents and therefore significantly hinders cancer treatment. Oroidin reverses MDR by interfering the MDR enzyme activity without having severe toxicity unlike other compounds. It is thus a potential novel drug lead for MDR with no or little toxicity towards cancer patients.

=== Parasitic diseases ===
Oroidin also shows moderate anti-protozoal activity against several major parasites. Oroidin kills and/or inhibits the growth of Trypanosoma brucei rhodesiense (causes African sleeping sickness), Trypanosoma cruzi, (causes Chagas disease), Leishmania donovani (causes Leishmaniasis), and Plasmodium falciparum (causes Malaria), making it a potential treatment for these diseases.

=== Bacteria biofilm ===
Oroidin inhibits bacteria biofilm formation and its analog is a pivotal compound in developing biofilm inhibitors.Bacteria biofilm leads to skin infection and is typically resistant to antibiotics. Therefore, the antibiofilm activity of Oroidin helps develop effective treatment for biofilm skin infection.

== Ecological function ==
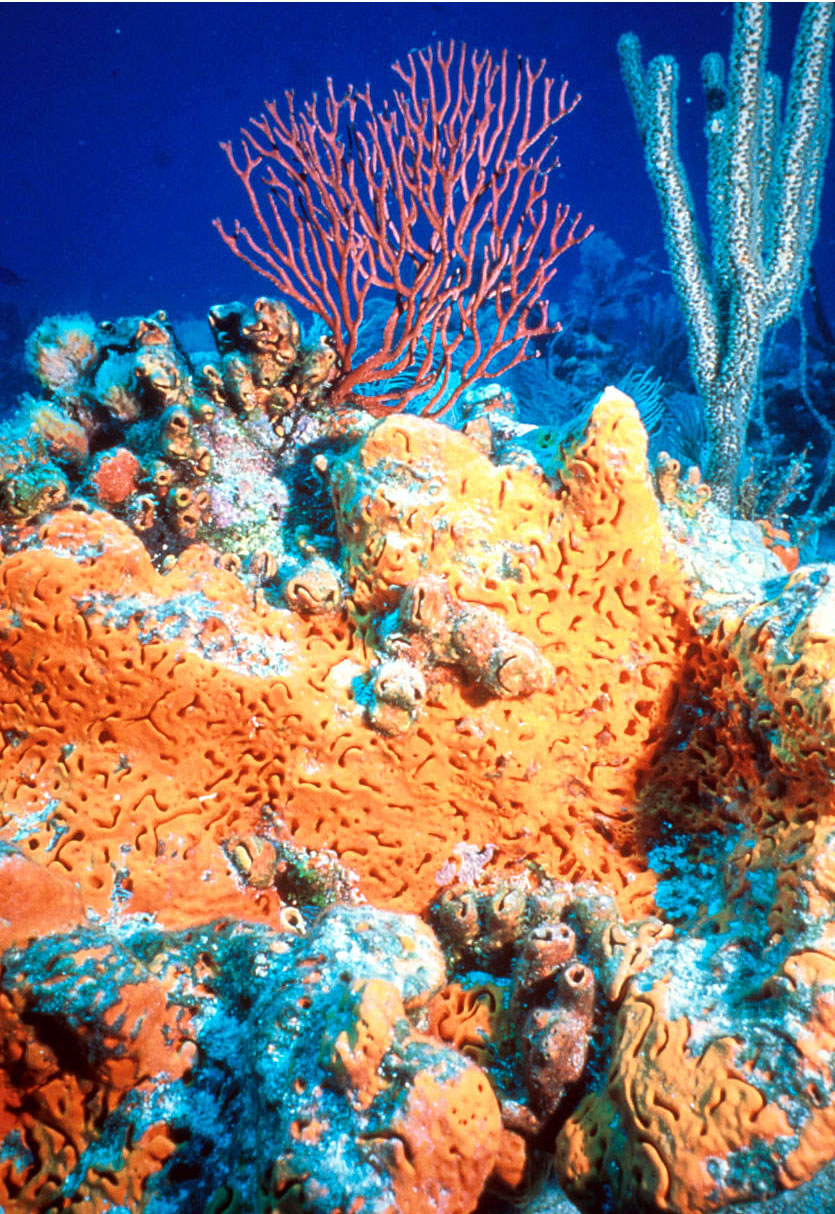
Sea sponge Agelas

Oroidin defends marine sponges against predation and disease outbreak. The sponges produce and secrete Oroidin (possibility with other secondary metabolites) in response to these ecological threats. In 1996, Oroidin and its hydrolysis product, 4,5-dibromo-1H-pyrrole-2-carboxylic acid, were isolated and identified as the chemical defensesagainst fish predators. Later, a study found that Oroidin also regulates bacterioplankton communities and inhibit pathogenesis.

A study suggests site-specific variation in secretion concentration of Oroidin. This could be due to different environmental conditions, such as differences in ocean depth and particulate organic matter (POM) availability. POM is a major nutrient source for sponges at depths, and POM availability increases with increasing depth. Deep sea sponges secrete Oroidin three times more than shallow sponges, possibly due to the increased POM availability for energetic surplus.

The chemical defense mechanisms still remain unclear since most studies on Oroidin focus on its biological activities. However, molecules responsible for chemical defense appear to be evolutionary conserved and contribute to the success of marine sponges.

== See also ==
- Alkaloid
- Natural products
