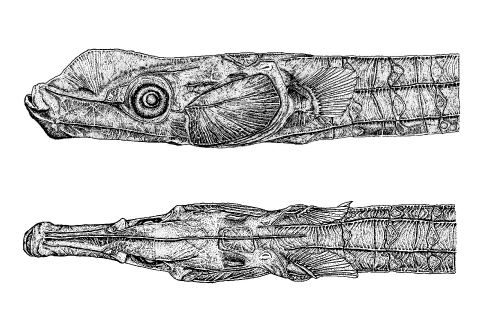

Conservation status
- Least Concern (IUCN 3.1)

Scientific classification
- Domain: Eukaryota
- Kingdom: Animalia
- Phylum: Chordata
- Class: Actinopterygii
- Order: Syngnathiformes
- Family: Syngnathidae
- Genus: Histiogamphelus
- Species: H. cristatus

Binomial name
- Histiogamphelus cristatus (MacLeay 1881)

= Histiogamphelus cristatus =

Species of fish

Histiogamphelus cristatus, known as Macleay's crested pipefish or rhino pipefish, is a species of marine fish belonging to the family Sygnathidae. This species can be found in a variety of marine habitats such as seagrass beds, sandy ocean bottoms, and estuaries, surrounding south and southwestern Australia. Their main source of food are small crustaceans found in the water column or in sediments. Males of the species brood eggs and give birth to live offspring.
