= Parenchymella =

Juvenile form of some sponges

Parenchymella is a type of larva of a demosponge composed of an envelope of flagellated cells surrounding an internal mass of cells. Demospongiae develops directly into solid stereoblastula. It then develops flagellae to form parenchymella.
