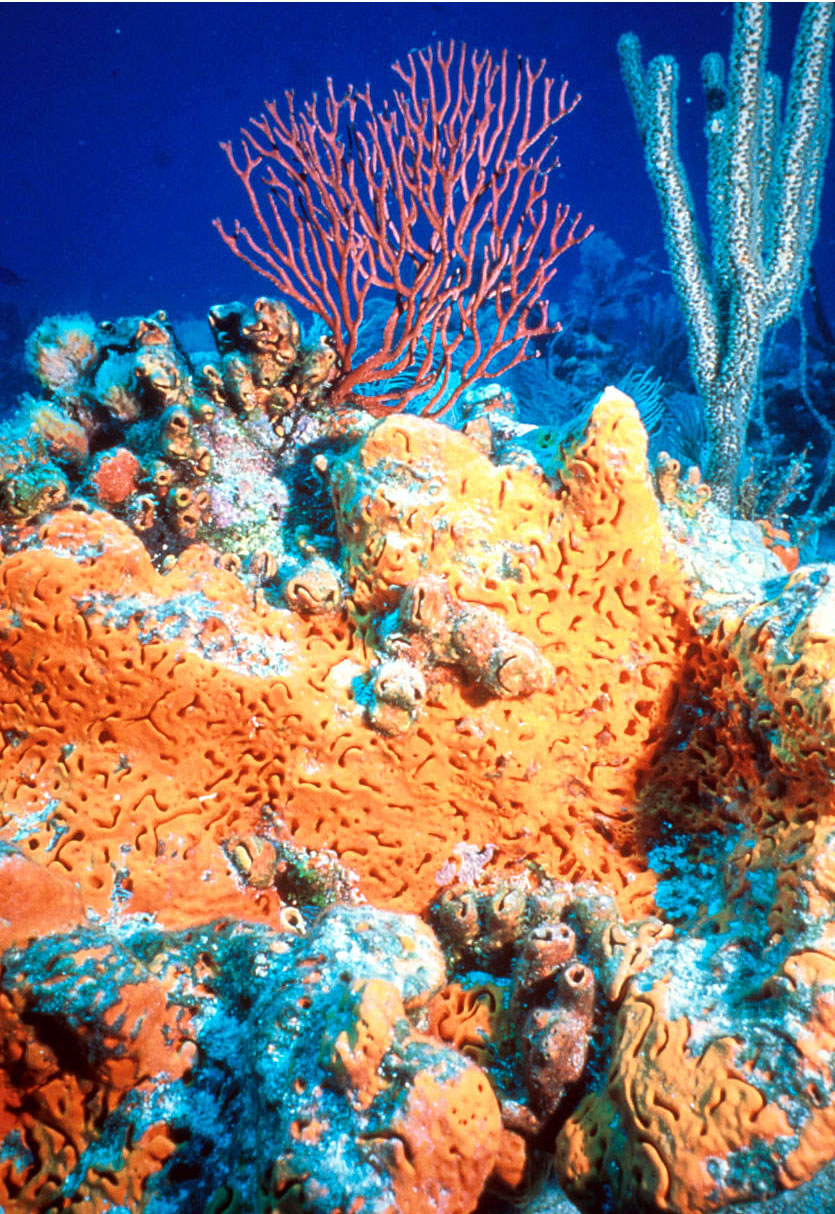
- Orange elephant ear sponge, Agelas clathrodes, in foreground. Two soft corals in the background: a sea fan, Iciligorgia schrammi, and a sea rod, Plexaurella nutans.

Scientific classification
- Kingdom: Animalia
- Phylum: Porifera
- Class: Demospongiae
- Order: Agelasida
- Family: Agelasidae
- Genus: Agelas; Duchassaing & Michelotti, 1864

Species
- See text

Synonyms
- List: Chalinopsis Schmidt, 1870; Ectyon Gray, 1867; Oroidea Gray, 1867; Pachychalinopsis Schmidt, 1880; Siphonochalinopsis Schmidt, 1880

= Agelas =

Genus of sponges

Agelas is a genus of sea sponge in the class Demospongiae.

== Ecology and distribution ==
Members of this genus are filter feeders. and occur in the West Indies, the Mediterranean Sea, the Red Sea and the Indian Ocean in shallow tropical and subtropical waters down to a depth of 30 metres (98 ft) or exceptionally 50 metres (160 ft).

== Spicules ==
Some authorities report that the spongin fibres contain no coring spicules while others report that there are some of variable length. Fernando Parra-Velandia however, describing the Caribbean species in the group, writes that "The presence of verticillated acanthostyle spicules and a fibroreticulate skeleton of spongin fibres cored and/or echinated by spicules characterize this group."

== Species ==
The World Register of Marine Species includes the following species in the genus:

- Agelas axifera Hentschel, 1911
- Agelas bispiculata Vacelet, Vasseur & Lévi, 1976
- Agelas braekmani Thomas, 1998
- Agelas cavernosa Thiele, 1903
- Agelas cerebrum Assmann, van Soest & Köck, 2001
- Agelas cervicornis (Schmidt, 1870)
- Agelas ceylonica Dendy, 1905
- Agelas citrina Gotera & Alcolado, 1987
- Agelas clathrodes (Schmidt, 1870)
- Agelas conifera (Schmidt, 1870)
- Agelas dendromorpha Lévi, 1993
- Agelas dilatata Duchassaing & Michelotti, 1864
- Agelas dispar Duchassaing & Michelotti, 1864
- Agelas flabelliformis (Carter, 1883)
- Agelas gracilis Whitelegge, 1897
- Agelas inaequalis Pulitzer-Finali, 1986
- Agelas linnaei De Voogd, Parra-Velandia & Van Soest, 2008
- Agelas marmarica Lévi, 1958
- Agelas mauritiana (Carter, 1883)
- Agelas nakamurai Hoshino, 1985
- Agelas nemoechinata Hoshino, 1985
- Agelas novaecaledoniae Lévi & Lévi, 1983
- Agelas oroides (Schmidt, 1864)
- Agelas repens Lehnert & van Soest, 1998
- Agelas robusta Pulitzer-Finali, 1982
- Agelas rudis Duchassaing & Michelotti, 1864
- Agelas sceptrum (Lamarck, 1815)
- Agelas schmidtii Wilson, 1902
- Agelas semiglaber Pulitzer-Finali, 1996
- Agelas sventres Lehnert & van Soest, 1996
- Agelas tubulata Lehnert & van Soest, 1996
- Agelas wiedenmayeri Alcolado, 1984
