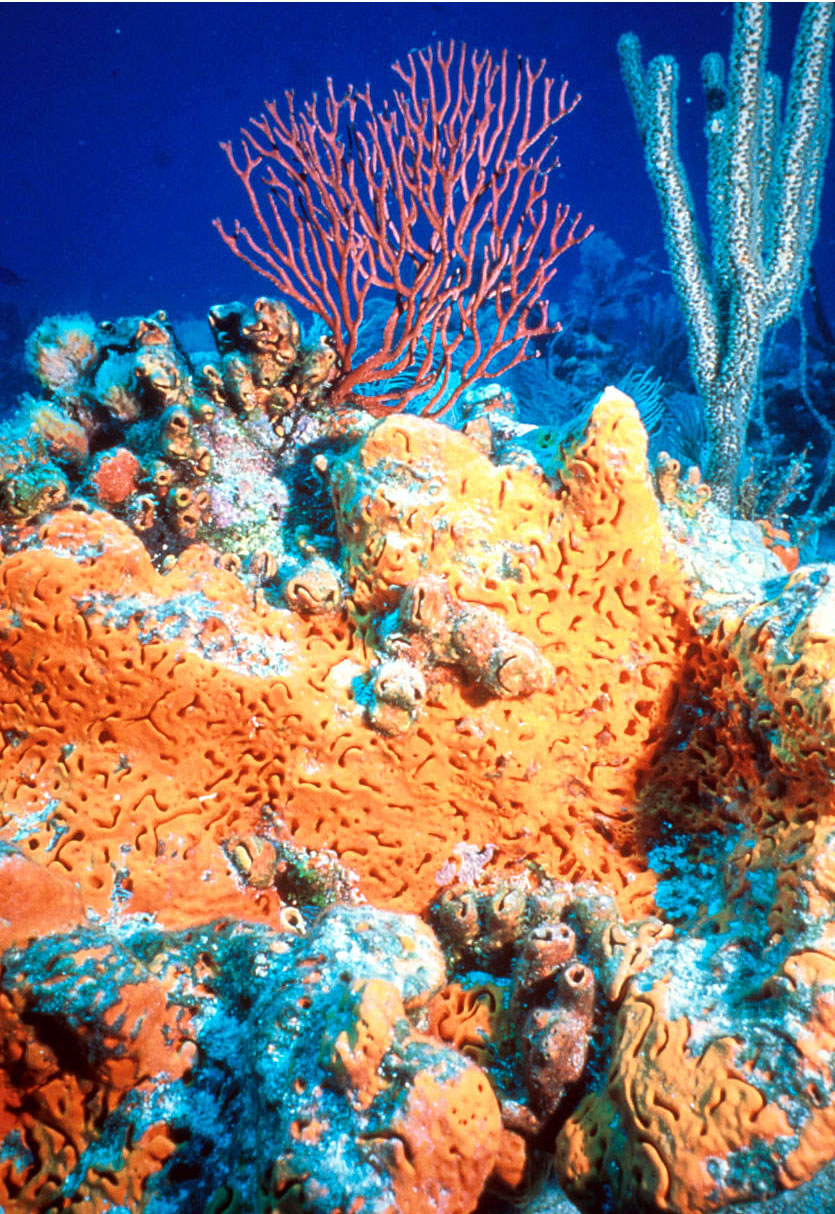
- Orange elephant ear sponge with a sea fan, Iciligorgia schrammi and a sea rod Plexaurella nutans behind

Scientific classification
- Kingdom: Animalia
- Phylum: Porifera
- Class: Demospongiae
- Order: Agelasida
- Family: Agelasidae
- Genus: Agelas
- Species: A. clathrodes

Binomial name
- Agelas clathrodes (Schmidt, 1870)

Synonyms
- Chalinopsis clathrodes Schmidt, 1870

= Agelas clathrodes =

Species of sponge

Agelas clathrodes, also known as the orange elephant ear sponge, is a species of sea sponge. It lives on reefs in the Caribbean, usually more than 10 metres (33 ft) below the surface of the ocean. It takes various forms, and its color is reddish orange.

== Description ==
The orange elephant ear sponge is very variable in form. It may be encrusting, developing a thickness up to 10 cm (4 in) thick or have large, flabby lobes or be fan-, tube- or ridge-shaped. Large specimens may combine several of these forms. The surfaces are perforated by small holes, both circular and irregularly elongate, especially on the side away from the current. The flesh is tough, firm and resilient and the thick surface skin is rough to the touch. The colour can vary from yellow, through orange to brick red or brown.

This sponge can be confused with Agelas citrina but that species is usually pinkish or creamy yellow. Another similar species is Agelas sventres but that has round holes on the exposed side, each with a noticeable rim.

== Distribution ==
The orange elephant ear sponge is found in the Caribbean Sea, the Bahamas and Florida. It is found on reefs and reef slopes and on vertical rock surfaces, particularly where the current is strong, and usually at depths greater than 10 metres (33 ft). This specie is most likely found in mesophotic reefs, with depth ranging from 30-150 meters. At this area, light is limited and the competition for space is very high.

== Biology ==
Like other demosponges, the orange elephant ear sponge is a filter feeder. Water circulates through the sponge, entering through fine pores and leaving through the larger holes. Oxygen and food particles (mostly bacteria) are removed from the water as it passes through the sponge, and waste products are carried away.

The orange elephant ear sponge is a hermaphrodite; different individuals in a particular population synchronise their spawning activity. In Curaçao, they usually choose an afternoon in the second half of July when the moon is in its fourth quarter. By all spawning at the same time, the sponges maximize their reproductive success. The eggs are surrounded by a mass of nurse cells which may provide nutrients to the developing larvae. The orange elephant ear sponge also reproduces asexually. When pieces of sponge become detached they may later reattach themselves to the substrate.

The sponge contains secondary metabolites that are distasteful to predatory fish such as the blue-headed wrasse (Thalassoma bifasciatum). Researchers found that the compounds involved were identical in various members of the genus Agelas, showing that such chemical defences must have been in use before the species evolved from a common ancestor.
