= Rhizostomins =

Type of protein found in jellyfish

Rhizostomins are proteins that are part of a pigment family only found in jellyfish in the order Rhizostomeae. These proteins are composed of a Kringle domain inserted within a cysteine-rich Frizzled domain, first identified in 2004 as the blue pigment in the barrel jellyfish Rhizostoma pulmo. It also appears in rhizostome jellyfish that do not appear blue, such as in Nemopilema nomurai, which typically presents red-brown coloration. It has been hypothesized that pigments in this family act as a sunscreen, protecting from harmful ultraviolet radiation. Natural blue pigments, such as some of the rhizostomins, are rare and there is a growing need for industrial purposes.
