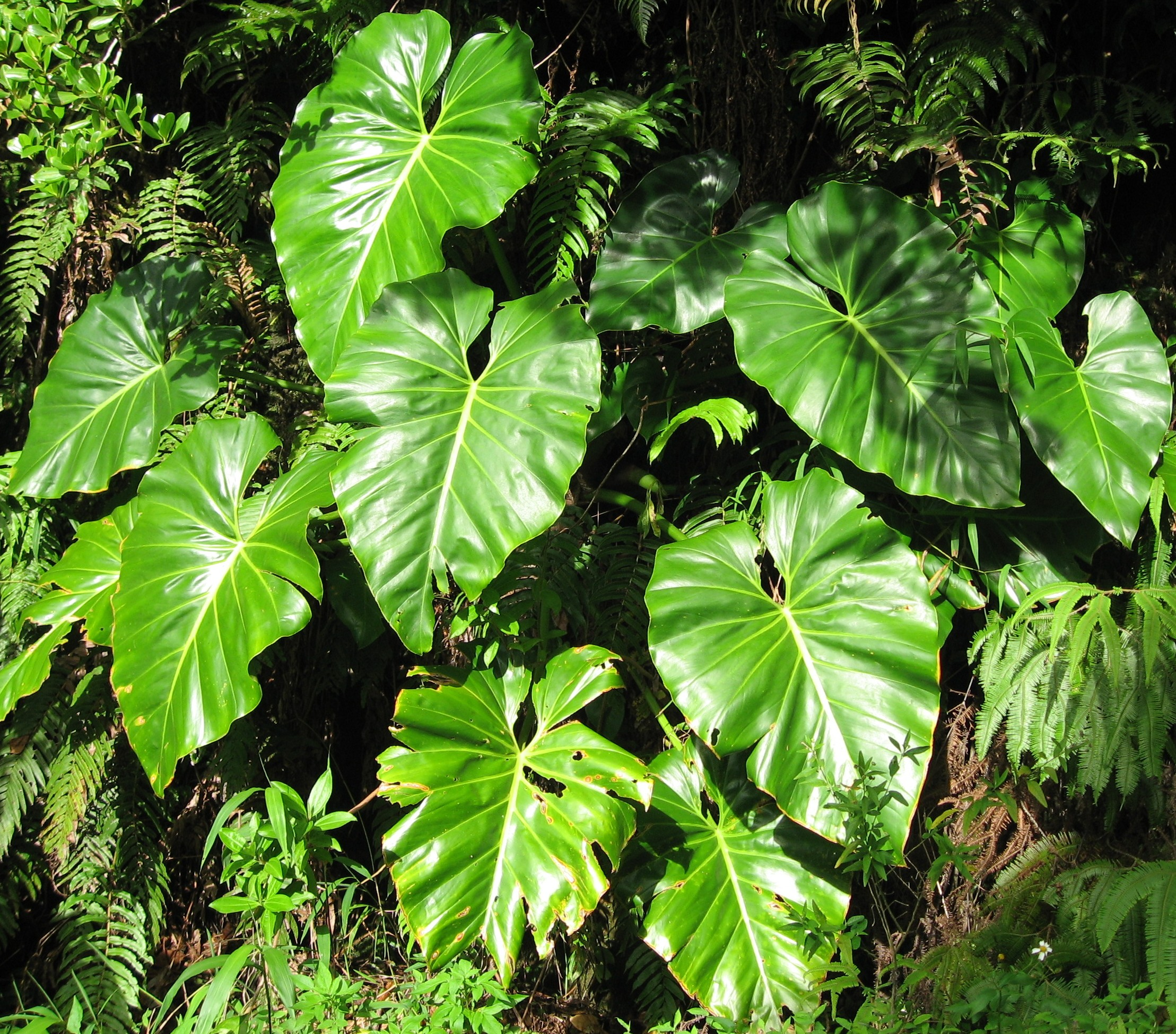
- P. giganteum in Guadeloupe

Scientific classification
- Kingdom: Plantae
- Clade: Tracheophytes
- Clade: Angiosperms
- Clade: Monocots
- Order: Alismatales
- Family: Araceae
- Genus: Philodendron
- Species: P. giganteum

Binomial name
- Philodendron giganteum Schott

= Philodendron giganteum =

Species of plant

Philodendron giganteum is a species of plant in the Araceae family. It is found in the Caribbean and South America. Heinrich Wilhelm Schott first described it in 1856. P. giganteum inflorescences are thermogenetic and emit a sweet odor. In the English-speaking Caribbean, this plant may be called Elephant Ear or Chinny Leaf.

== See also ==
- List of Philodendron species
