= Sceptrin =

Names
- Systematic IUPAC name N,N′-{[(1R,2R,3S,4S)-3,4-Bis(2-amino-1H-imidazol-5-yl)cyclobutane-1,2-diyl]bis(methylene)}bis(4-bromopyrrole-2-carboxamide)

Identifiers
CAS Number	79638-16-7
3D model (JSmol)	Interactive image
ChEBI	CHEBI:80954
ChEMBL	ChEMBL307456
ChemSpider	138516
KEGG	C17166
PubChem CID	157394
UNII	K5NTW7L834
CompTox Dashboard (EPA)	DTXSID00276460
- InChI: InChI=1S/C22H24Br2N10O2/c23-9-1-13(27-3-9)19(35)29-5-11-12(6-30-20(36)14-2-10(24)4-28-14)18(16-8-32-22(26)34-16)17(11)15-7-31-21(25)33-15/h1-4,7-8,11-12,17-18,27-28H,5-6H2,(H,29,35)(H,30,36)(H3,25,31,33)(H3,26,32,34)/t11-,12-,17-,18-/m1/s1 Key: YPZNLFZLPZWWAD-GWIYSAMLSA-N; InChI=1/C22H24Br2N10O2/c23-9-1-13(27-3-9)19(35)29-5-11-12(6-30-20(36)14-2-10(24)4-28-14)18(16-8-32-22(26)34-16)17(11)15-7-31-21(25)33-15/h1-4,7-8,11-12,17-18,27-28H,5-6H2,(H,29,35)(H,30,36)(H3,25,31,33)(H3,26,32,34)/t11-,12-,17-,18-/m1/s1 Key: YPZNLFZLPZWWAD-GWIYSAMLBB
- SMILES: C1=C(NC=C1Br)C(=O)NC[C@@H]2[C@H]([C@@H]([C@H]2C3=CN=C(N3)N)C4=CN=C(N4)N)CNC(=O)C5=CC(=CN5)Br

Properties
Chemical formula	C_{22}H_{24}Br_{2}N_{10}O_{2}
Molar mass	620.310 g·mol^{−1}
- Except where otherwise noted, data are given for materials in their standard state (at 25 °C [77 °F], 100 kPa). Infobox references

Sceptrin is a bioactive marine isolate. It has been isolated from the marine sponge Agelas conifera and appears to have affinity for the bacterial actin equivalent MreB. As such, this compound possess antibiotic potential.

== See also ==
- Ageliferin
- Prokaryotic cytoskeleton
