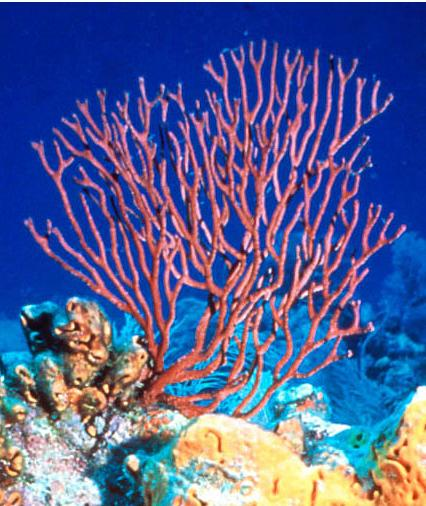

Scientific classification
- Kingdom: Animalia
- Phylum: Cnidaria
- Subphylum: Anthozoa
- Class: Octocorallia
- Order: Malacalcyonacea
- Family: Melithaeidae
- Genus: Iciligorgia
- Species: I. schrammi

Binomial name
- Iciligorgia schrammi Duchassaing, 1870

= Iciligorgia schrammi =

Species of coral

Iciligorgia schrammi, common names deepwater sea fan and black sea fan is a species of gorgonian sea fan in the family Melithaeidae. It is found in tropical parts of the Atlantic Ocean. This species was first described in 1870 by the French naturalist Édouard Placide Duchassaing de Fontbressin.

== Description ==
Iciligorgia schrammi is the largest of the sea fans and large specimens are much bigger than gorgonians. It is dichotomously branched in a single plane with the branches much further apart than other sea fans, giving it a ragged appearance. However, small specimens do not give this impression. The main branches are somewhat flattened and are 3 to 5 millimetres (0.12 to 0.20 in) in width. The polyps protrude from the edges of the branches. Their calyces are dome-shaped and have eight separate lobes. The polyps are stiffened with sclerites, which are curved spindles and rods which are arranged as a collar with pointed projections. The colour of this sea fan is usually light brown to bright red. Several brittle stars were associated with it in this habitat.

== Distribution ==
In the Atlantic Ocean, this species is found from south Florida southwards to Brazil, and in the Caribbean Sea and the Gulf of Mexico. A single specimen was found in the South Atlantic Bight in Georgia in 2007 which is a northward extension to its range.

== Habitat ==
Iciligorgia schrammi normally grows at depths from 3 to 368 metres. It lives on vertical walls, standing out perpendicularly, and can also grow in deep water where the water is clear and the current high on slope breaks.
