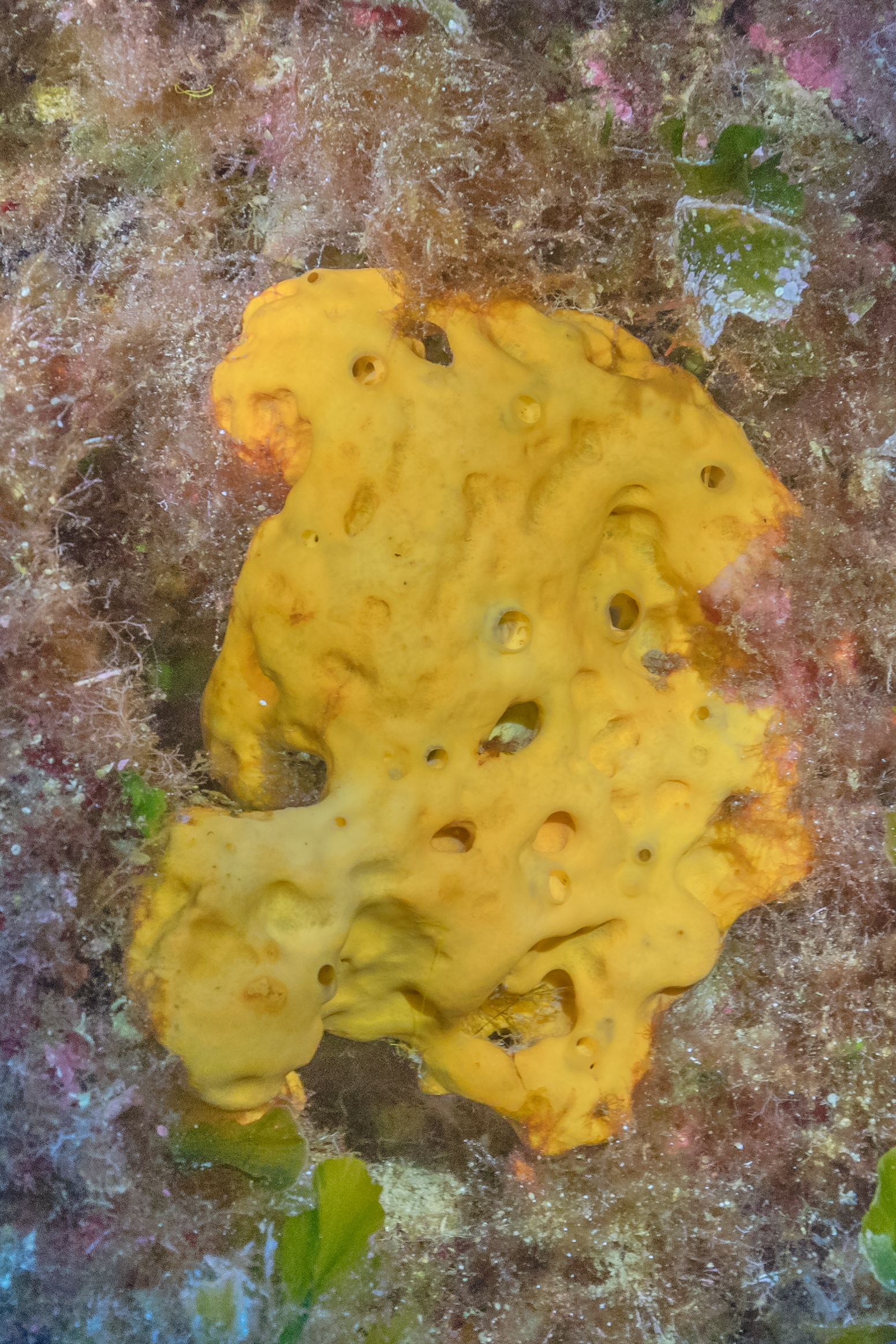
- Agelas oroides

Scientific classification
- Kingdom: Animalia
- Phylum: Porifera
- Class: Demospongiae
- Subclass: Heteroscleromorpha
- Order: Agelasida; Hartman, 1980

Families
- Agelasidae Verrill, 1907; Astroscleridae Lister, 1900; Hymerhabdiidae Morrow, Picton, Erpenbeck, Boury-Esnault, Maggs & Allcock, 2012

= Agelasida =

Order of sponges

Agelasida is an order of sea sponges in the class Demospongiae.
