= FIRRM =

Protein-coding gene in humans

Identifiers
- Aliases: FIRRM, chromosome 1 open reading frame 112, C1orf112, FIGNL1 Interacting Regulator Of Recombination And Mitosis, FLIP, MEICA1, APOLO1
- External IDs: MGI: 3590554; GeneCards: FIRRM

Gene location (Human)
Chr.	Chromosome 1 (human)
Band	1q24.2	Start	169,662,007 bp
Band	1q24.2	End	169,854,080 bp

Gene location (Mouse)
Chr.	Chromosome 1 (mouse)
Band	1|1 H2.2	Start	163,773,562 bp
Band	1|1 H2.2	End	163,822,365 bp
RNA expression pattern
Bgee	Human / Mouse (ortholog); Top expressed in: gonad; testicle; ventricular zone; ganglionic eminence; Achilles tendon; right testis; left testis; monocyte; stromal cell of endometrium; rectum / Top expressed in: primary oocyte; primitive streak; hand; tail of embryo; epiblast; condyle; fossa; genital tubercle; medullary collecting duct; spermatocyte; More reference expression data
BioGPS	n/a
Orthologs
Databases	NCBI: entry; OMA: entry
Species	Human	Mouse
Entrez	55732	381306
Ensembl	ENSG00000000460	ENSMUSG00000041406
UniProt	Q9NSG2	Q3TQQ9
RefSeq (mRNA)	NM_018186; NM_001320047; NM_001320048; NM_001320050; NM_001320051 NM_001363739; NM_001366768; NM_001366769; NM_001366770; NM_001366771; NM_001366772; NM_001366773	NM_201364; NM_001357049
RefSeq (protein)	NP_001306976; NP_001306977; NP_001306979; NP_001306980; NP_001350668 NP_001353697; NP_001353698; NP_001353699; NP_001353700; NP_001353701; NP_001353702; NP_060656.2; NP_001306976.1	NP_958752; NP_001343978
Location (UCSC)	Chr 1: 169.66 – 169.85 Mb	Chr 1: 163.77 – 163.82 Mb
PubMed search
- Wikidata
View/Edit Human	View/Edit Mouse

FIGNL1-interacting regulator of recombination and mitosis, is a protein that in humans is encoded by the gene FIRRM (previously C1orf112), and is located at position 1q24.2. FIRRM encodes for seventeen variants of mRNA, fifteen of which are functional proteins. FIRRM has a determined precursor molecular weight of 96.6 kDa and an isoelectric point of 5.62. FIRRM has been experimentally determined to localize to the mitochondria, although it does not contain a mitochondrial targeting sequence.

== Gene ==
The gene spans 192,073 base pairs, with 29 different exons. C1orf112 is located at position 1q24.2. C1orf112 shares antisense coding regions with C1orf156 and SCYL3.

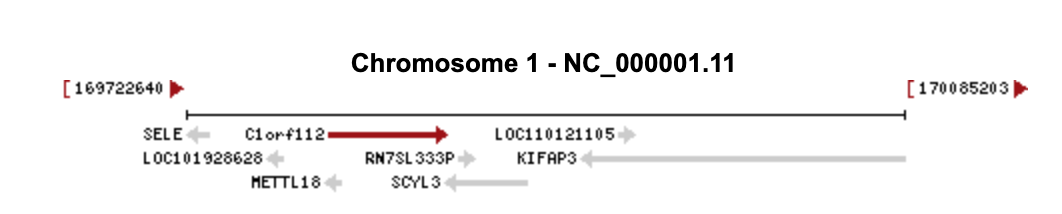
Location of chromosome 1 open reading frame 112 in context of other genes within the region 1q24.2. Image courtesy of National Center for Biotechnology Information (NCBI).

== Protein ==
There are currently eight experimentally determined RefSeq isoforms. C1orf112 has a domain of unknown function DUF4487.

=== Composition ===
Compositional analysis through SAPS predicted much less glycine and much more leucine than expected relative to other human protein sequences. This characteristic is conserved across primate orthologs. A mixed charge cluster was found in Isoform X1 from position 747 to 805, indicating that this segment may be aqueous and tightly bound. This mixed charge cluster is only partially conserved across orthologs.

=== Transcripts ===
C1orf112 is determined to have 9 transcripts, or splice variants by Ensembl.

=== Subcellular Localization ===
Antibody immunocytochemistry and immunofluorescent staining of human cell line A-431 indicates C1orf112 is localized to the mitochondria.

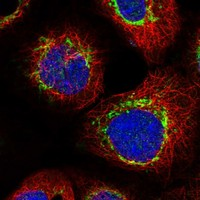
Immunofluorescent staining of human cell line A-431 indicates localization to mitochondria. Image courtesy of Human Protein Atlas and Sigma-Aldrich antibody HPA024451.

== Regulation ==
=== Gene level regulation ===
==== Expression ====
Although tissue-level expression is ubiquitous, C1orf112 is expressed highest in the testes, lymph nodes, brain marrow, and cerebellum, with samples from 97 individual in 27 different tissues. In-situ hybridization of the human transcriptome indicates expression is highest in the atrioventricular node, followed by the testis, testis germ cells, and testis interstitial tissue.

=== Transcript level regulation ===
Transcription factor assessment indicates many potential TATA-binding protein and CCAAT-enhancer-binding proteins sites, along with transcription factors associated with the testis, thymus, kidneys, and cardiac tissue.

=== Protein level regulation ===
There are two ubiquitination sites on C1orf112, at position lysine 73 and at position 783 on isoform X1. Downstream of reading frame, there are three polyadenylation signals. In addition, there is an N6-acetyllysine site at leucine 747 and a phosphoserine site at serine 23. C1orf112 has been found experimentally to interact with ATG1, an aldosterone secretion whose overexpression characterizes certain forms of breast cancer. Post-translational modifications predictions include O-glycosyl-oligosaccharide-glycoprotein N-acetylglucosaminyltransferase III and sumoylation, and sumoylation interaction sites.

=== Interacting proteins ===
C1orf112 is predicted to interact with a diverse range of proteins, including multiple mitosis-associated proteins. C1orf112 is also predicted to interact with FIGNL1, a protein involved in DNA double-stranded break repair via homologous recombination. Experimental findings indicate C1orf112 interacts with NUF2, a spindle-pole body protein that plays a critical role in nuclear division, and TTK, a protein kinase capable of phosphorylating serine, threonine, and tyrosine.

== Homology/evolution ==
=== Paralogs ===
There are no known paralogs of C1orf112.

=== Orthologs ===
C1orf112 is highly conserved in Pan troglodytes, Rhinopithecus bieti, Castor canadensis, Miniopterus natalensis, and other select primates, with percent identity relative to Homo sapien C1orf112, with percent identity greater than 90%. Orthologs with the greatest date of divergence (date of speciation) to human C1orf112 include Trichosporon asahii, a placozoa, and Amphimedon queenslandica, indicated that C1orf112 has been preserved over evolutionary time.

C1orf112 Orthologs in Ascending Divergence
Genus/Species	Common Name	Taxonomic Group	Date of Divergence (Estimated Time)	Accession #	Sequence Length (aa)	% Identity	% Similarity	E Value
Homo sapiens	Humans	Mammals	0	NP_001306976.1	853	100	100	
Pan troglodytes	Chimpanzees	Primates	6.65 mya	XP_009436263.1	911	99	99	0
Rhinopithecus bieti	Black Stub-Nosed Monkey	Primates	29.44 mya	XP_017723911.1	911	97	98	0
Castor canadensis	American Beaver	Rodentia	90 mya	XP_020026631.1	908	87	92	0
Miniopterus natalensis	Natural long-fingered bat	Chiroptera	96 mya	XP_016077003.1	912	84	90	0
Condylura cristata	Star-Nosed Mole	Soricomorpha	96 mya	XP_024409392.1	531	77	85	0
Bos indicus	Zebu	Cetartiodactyla	96 mya	XP_019832063.1	875	84	90	0
Acinonyx jubatus	Cheetah	Carnivora	96 mya	XP_026902260.1	912	86	90	0
Aptenodytes forsteri	Emperor Penguin	Aves	312 mya	XP_009271565.1	839	59	76	0
Chelonia mydas	Green Sea Turtle	Reptilia	312 mya	XP_007061247.1	849	64	78	0
Xenopus laevis	African Clawed Frog	Amphibia	352 mya	XP_018114274.1	904	55	72	0
Nanorana parkeri	Nanora parkeri	Amphibia	352 mya	XP_018428126.1	698	52	70	0
Salmo salar	Atlantic Salmon	Actinopterygii	435 mya	XP_013979201.1	924	47	64	0
Helobdella robusta	Earth worm	Clitellata	797 mya	XP_009029571.1	1004	25	43	0
Amphimedon queenslandica	Sponge	Porifera	951.8 mya	XP_019856681.1	903	28	46	0
Trichosporon asahii	Fungi	Fungi	1105 mya	XP_014176969.1	2588	43	68	0.006

Date of divergence was calculated using TimeTree. The E value indicates the number of "hits" one can expect to see by chance when using the NCBI database, with a low E value indicated a significant result. Percent identity is the percentage of character that align to Homo sapien C1orf112 Isoform X1, while percent similarity is the degree of resemblance when the two sequences are aligned with one another.

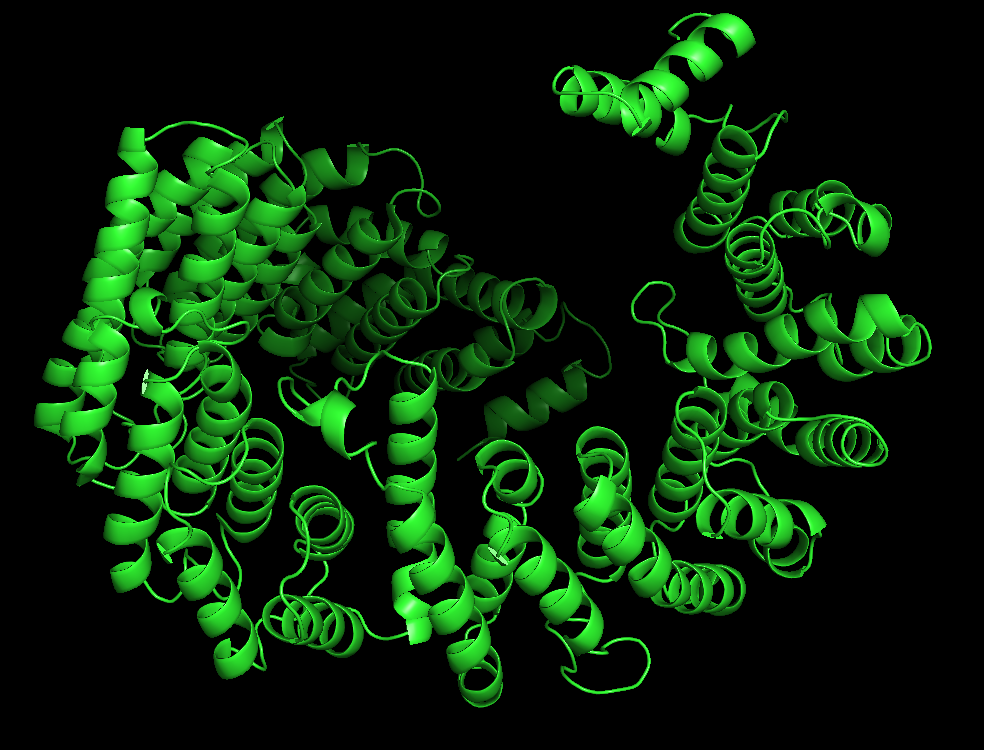
Predicted tertiary structure for C1orf112 with highest statistical significance, generated by I-TASSER

== Protein structure ==
=== Secondary and tertiary structure ===
C1orf112 secondary structure is predicted to be predominately alpha helical, with < 5% of the protein composed of beta sheets. Ligand binding sites are predicted by I-TASSER from positions 377 to 530 in Isoform X1. A leucine zipper motif is present in Isoform X1 from positions 831–852, predicted by MyHits.

== Clinical significance ==
C1orf112 was one of many genes found to be co-expressed with cancer-associated genes, and the knockdown of this gene in a HeLa cell line suppressed growth.
