= Amphimedon paraviridis =

Scientific classification
- Domain: Eukaryota
- Kingdom: Animalia
- Phylum: Porifera
- Class: Demospongiae
- Order: Haplosclerida
- Family: Niphatidae
- Genus: Amphimedon
- Species: A. paraviridis

Binomial name
- Amphimedon paraviridis Fromont, 1993

Species of sponge

Holotype site'"`UNIQ--ref-00000006-QINU`"'

Amphimedon paraviridis is a species of sponge in the family Niphatidae, first described by Jane Fromont in 1993, from a specimen collected at a depth of 7 m, in Geoffrey Bay, Magnetic Island, in the Great Barrier Reef.

== Distribution & Habitat ==
It is found from Lizard Island to the Whitsundays on the Great Barrier Reef, in shallow water in lagoons or reef flats at depths of 3-4 m, firmly attached to hard substrata.
