= Amphimedon lamellata =

Scientific classification
- Domain: Eukaryota
- Kingdom: Animalia
- Phylum: Porifera
- Class: Demospongiae
- Order: Haplosclerida
- Family: Niphatidae
- Genus: Amphimedon
- Species: A. lamellata

Binomial name
- Amphimedon lamellata Fromont, 1993

Species of sponge

Holotype site'"`UNIQ--ref-00000006-QINU`"'

Amphimedon lamellata is a species of sponge in the family Niphatidae, first described by Jane Fromont in 1993, from a specimen collected at a depth of 9 m, from Macgillivray Reef, Lizard Island in the Great Barrier Reef.

== Distribution & Habitat ==
It is found from Lizard Island to the Whitsundays on the Great Barrier Reef, on reef slopes at depths of 10-15 m, attached to rocky substrata.
