= Dasychalina fragilis =

Scientific classification
- Kingdom: Animalia
- Phylum: Porifera
- Class: Demospongiae
- Order: Haplosclerida
- Family: Niphatidae
- Genus: Dasychalina
- Species: D. fragilis

Binomial name
- Dasychalina fragilis Ridley & Dendy, 1886

Species of sponge

Dasychalina fragilis is a species of sponge described by Stuart Oliver Ridley and Arthur Dendy in 1886. Dasychalina fragilis belongs to the genus Dasychalina and the family Niphatidae.

The species' range is in the Philippines.
