= B-1,3-galactosyl-O-glycosyl-glycoprotein b-1,3-N-acetylglucosaminyltransferase =

Class of enzymes

Beta-1,3-galactosyl-O-glycosyl-glycoprotein beta-1,3-N-acetylglucosaminyltransferase

Identifiers
- EC no.: 2.4.1.146
- CAS no.: 87927-99-9

Databases
- IntEnz: IntEnz view
- BRENDA: BRENDA entry
- ExPASy: NiceZyme view
- KEGG: KEGG entry
- MetaCyc: metabolic pathway
- PRIAM: profile
- PDB structures: RCSB PDB PDBe PDBsum
Search
- PMC: articles
- PubMed: articles
- NCBI: proteins

Beta-1,3-galactosyl-O-glycosyl-glycoprotein beta-1,3-N-acetylglucosaminyltransferase (EC 2.4.1.146, O-glycosyl-oligosaccharide-glycoprotein N-acetylglucosaminyltransferase II, uridine diphosphoacetylglucosamine-mucin beta(1->3)-acetylglucosaminyltransferase (elongating), elongation 3beta-GalNAc-transferase, UDP-N-acetyl-D-glucosamine:O-glycosyl-glycoprotein (N-acetyl-D-glucosamine to beta-D-galactose of beta-D-galactosyl-1,3-(N-acetyl-D-glucosaminyl-1,6)-N-acetyl-D-galactosaminyl-R) beta-1,3-N-acetyl-D-glucosaminyltransferase) is an enzyme with systematic name UDP-N-acetyl-D-glucosamine:beta-D-galactosyl-(1->3)-(N-acetyl-D-glucosaminyl-(1->6))-N-acetyl-D-galactosaminyl-R 3-beta-N-acetyl-D-glucosaminyltransferase. This enzyme catalyses the following chemical reaction

UDP-N-acetyl-D-glucosamine + beta-D-galactosyl-(1->3)-[N-acetyl-D-glucosaminyl-(1->6)]-N-acetyl-D-galactosaminyl-R $\rightleftharpoons$ UDP + N-acetyl-beta-D-glucosaminyl-(1->3)-beta-D-galactosyl-(1->3)-[N-acetyl-beta-D-glucosaminyl-(1->6)]-N-acetyl-D-galactosaminyl-R

== See also ==
- EC 2.4.1.102 (beta-1,3-galactosyl-O-glycosyl-glycoprotein beta-1,6-N-acetylglucosaminyltransferase)
- EC 2.4.1.147 (acetylgalactosaminyl-O-glycosyl-glycoprotein beta-1,3-N-acetylglucosaminyltransferase)
- EC 2.4.1.148 (acetylgalactosaminyl-O-glycosyl-glycoprotein beta-1,6-N-acetylglucosaminyltransferase).
