= Niphates digitalis =

Pink vase sponge

Scientific classification
- Kingdom: Animalia
- Phylum: Porifera
- Class: Demospongiae
- Order: Haplosclerida
- Family: Niphatidae
- Genus: Niphates
- Species: N. digitalis

Binomial name
- Niphates digitalis (Lamarck, 1814)

Synonyms
- List: Dasychalina cyathina de Laubenfels, 1936; Gelliodes cyathina (De Laubenfels, 1936); Sclerochalina cyathus Schmidt, 1870; Spongia digitalis Lamarck, 1814; Tuba crispa Duchassaing & Michelotti, 1864*Tuba digitalis, Lamarck, 1814; Tuba incerta Duchassaing & Michelotti, 1864; Tuba pavonina Duchassaing & Michelotti, 1864

Species of sponge

Niphates digitalis, commonly known as the pink vase sponge, is a species of sea sponge belonging to the family Niphatidae. It is native to the Florida Keys, The Bahamas, and the Caribbean including the Netherlands Antilles.

The species was first described by Jean-Baptiste Lamarck in 1814.

== Description ==
A Cephalopholis cruentata grouper inside a pink vase sponge, in Cuba

The pink vase sponge is a demosponge that can grow up to 50 cm in height and width, but is more commonly smaller. It is normally vase-, tube-, or cup-shaped with a narrow base and broader top, and somewhat flattened when viewed in cross section. Rarely, it can grow as a fan shape. The surface is coarse and porous with 6-mm-long conules or spines.

Despite its name, the colour has been observed as blue, gray, and lavender, as well as "purplish to pink".

== Chemistry ==
Compounds extracted from the pink vase sponge have been investigated for their possible use in the treatment of castration recurrent prostate cancer. A common reagent used in organic chemistry 1,8-diazabicycloundec-7-ene can be isolated from this sponge.
