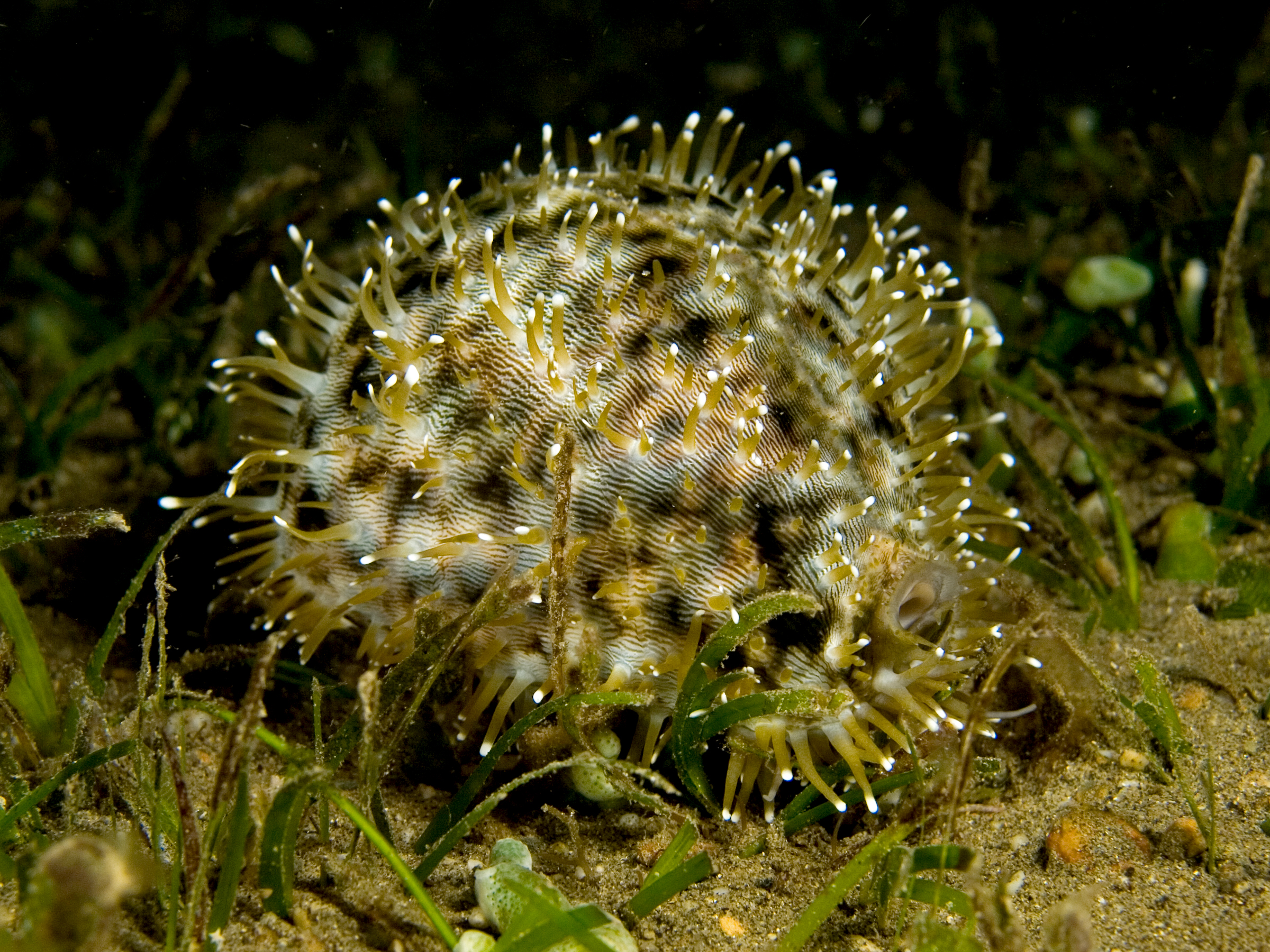
- Anterior view of a live individual of Cypraea tigris with its mantle fully extended

Scientific classification
- Kingdom: Animalia
- Phylum: Mollusca
- Class: Gastropoda
- Subclass: Caenogastropoda
- Order: Littorinimorpha
- Family: Cypraeidae
- Genus: Cypraea
- Species: C. tigris

Binomial name
- Cypraea tigris Linnaeus, 1758

Synonyms
- Cypraea ambigua Gmelin, 1791; Cypraea feminea Gmelin, 1791; Cypraea flammea Gmelin, 1791; Cypraea tigrina Gmelin, 1791; Cypraea pardalis Shaw, 1794; Cypraea onca Röding, 1798; Cypraea nigrescens Gray, 1824; Cypraea alauda Menke, 1830; Cypraea chionia Melvill, 1888; Cypraea flavonitens Melvill, 1888; Cypraea hinnula Melvill, 1888; Cypraea ionthodes Melvill, 1888; Cypraea russonitens Melvill, 1888; Cypraea tigris var. lyncichroa Melvill, 1888; Cypraea zymerasta Melvill, 1888; Cypraea flavida Dautzenberg, 1893; Cypraea incarna Sulliotti, 1924; Cypraea laminata Sulliotti, 1924; Cypraea tristis Sulliotti, 1924; Cypraea nephelodes Lancaster, 1928; Cypraea tigris ambolee (f) Steadman, W.R. & B.C. Cotton, 1943; Cypraea volai Steadman, W.R. & B.C. Cotton, 1943; Cypraea fuscoapicata Coen, G.S., 1949

= Cypraea tigris =

Species of gastropod

Cypraea tigris, commonly known as the tiger cowrie, is a species of cowry, a large sea snail, a marine gastropod mollusk in the family Cypraeidae, the cowries.

== Taxonomy ==
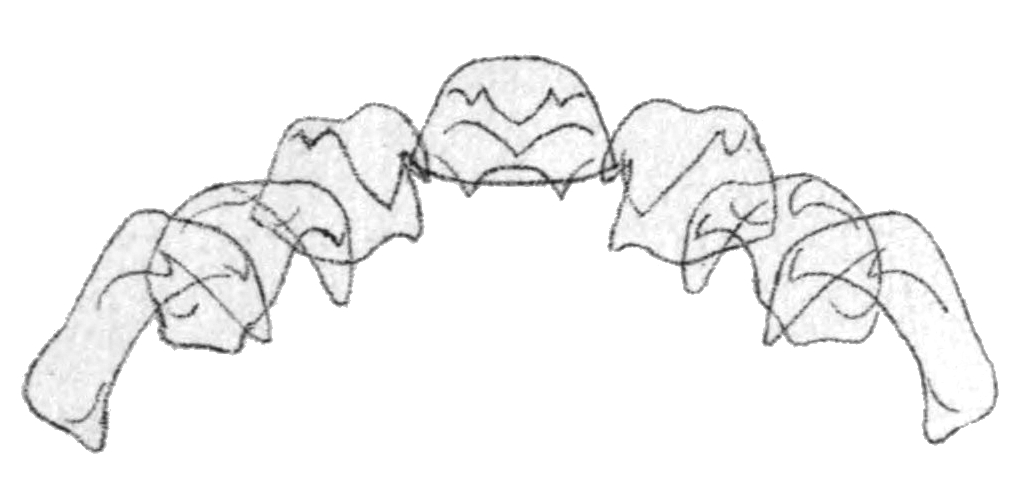
Drawing of the radula teeth of Cypraea tigris

The tiger cowry was one of the many species originally described by Carl Linnaeus in his 1758 10th edition of Systema Naturae, and the species still bears its original name of Cypraea tigris. Its specific epithet tigris relates to its common name "tiger" (the shell however is spotted, not striped). This species is the type species of the genus Cypraea.

== Subspecies and forms ==
- Cypraea tigris form incana Sulliotti, G.R., 1924
- Cypraea tigris form lyncicrosa Steadman, W.R. & B.C. Cotton, 1943
- Cypraea tigris var. schilderiana Cate, C.N., 1961 The variety Cypraea tigris var. schilderiana was recognized by Cate in 1961. It differs from Cypraea tigris in its large size (10–13 cm) and the lack of a thick marginal callus. This variety is found in the Hawaiian Islands, Johnston Island, and Vietnam.
- Cypraea tigris form tuberculifera Sulliotti, G.R., 1924
Cypraea tigris pardalis

Subadult

Dark form

== Description ==
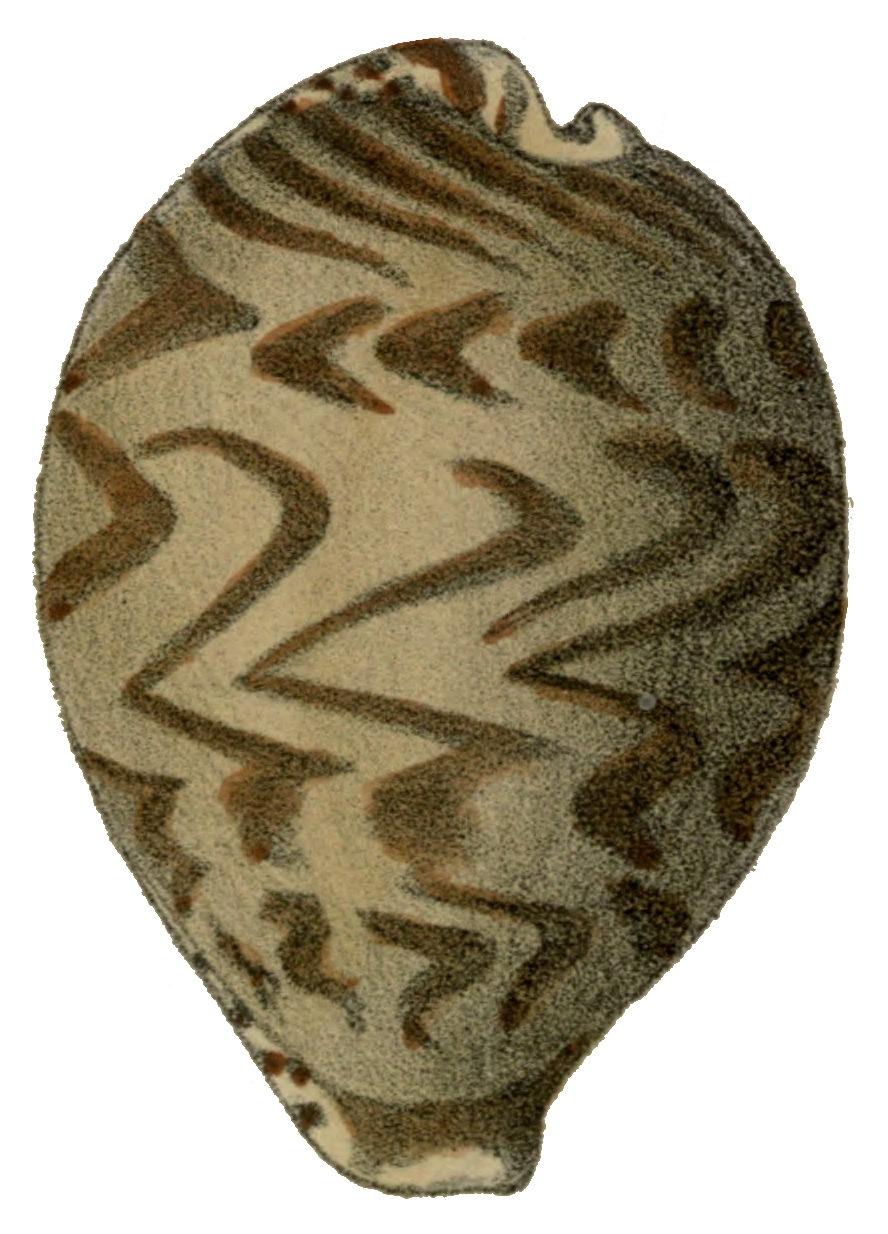
As is the case in most cowries, the subadult shell of Cypraea tigris has a different color pattern. The apex of the shell is a barely visible tubercule at the top right of the shell image

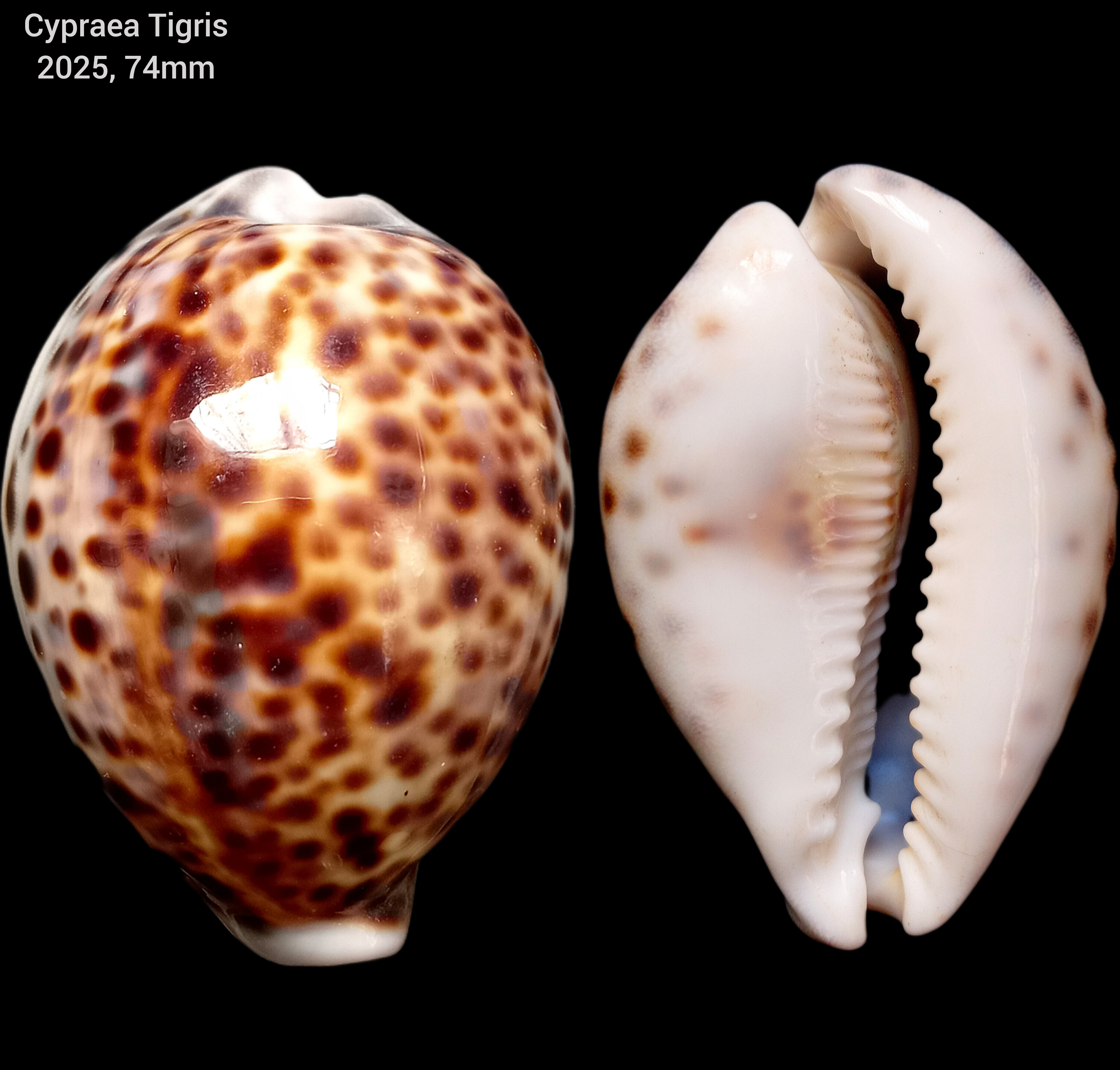
Cypraea Tigris

Roughly egg-shaped and dextral, the glossy shell is large and heavy for a cowry. It measures up to 15 cm (6 in) in length, and the upper or dorsal side is white, pale bluish-white, or buff, densely covered with dark brown or blackish barely circular spots. Akin to many other Cypraea snails, the shells surface is notably effulgent, as if it were deliberately polished. There is sometimes a blurred red line along the length of the shell at the midline on the dorsal surface. The lower margins are rounded (that is, there is no sharp margin between the upper and lower surfaces of the shell as is found in some other cowries). The ventral side is white or whitish, and the shell opening is lined with tooth-like serrations.

As is the case in almost all cypraeids, two lateral extensions of the mantle are able to extend so as to cover the shell completely, meeting at the midline of the dorsal surface. The mantle can also withdraw into the shell opening when threatened. In this species, the exterior surface of the mantle has numerous pin-like projections that are white-tipped.

== Distribution and habitat ==
The tiger cowrie is found on the ocean floor in the Indo-Pacific region, from the eastern coast of Africa to the waters of Micronesia and Polynesia, the Coral Sea and around the Philippines. Along the Australian Coast it is found from northern New South Wales to northern Western Australia, as well as Lord Howe Island, and along the east coast of Africa including Madagascar. Found between depths of 10 and 40 metres (35–130 ft), it is often associated with live coral colonies, such as the table-forming Acropora, either found on the reefs themselves or the sandy sea bottom nearby. Once common, it is now much less abundant due to shell collecting and the destruction of its habitat by such processes as dynamite fishing, especially in shallower areas. Carnivorous, the adult tiger cowrie eats coral and various invertebrates, while juveniles eat algae.

This species is endangered in Singapore.

== Diet ==
The Hawaiian subspecies C. t. schilderiana naturally preys on invasive sponges, including Dysidea spp., Mycale grandis, M. parishii, Haliclona caerulea, H. coerulea, Cladocroce burapha, and Gelliodes wilsoni. (Compounds in Monanchora clathrata acted as a repellent, so C. t. schilderiana avoided them.) Thus, C. t. schilderiana was found to be controlling invasive populations, which shows its importance in maintaining the normal variety of life in Hawaiian marine habitats by constraining invasive species in Hawaii.

== Human use ==
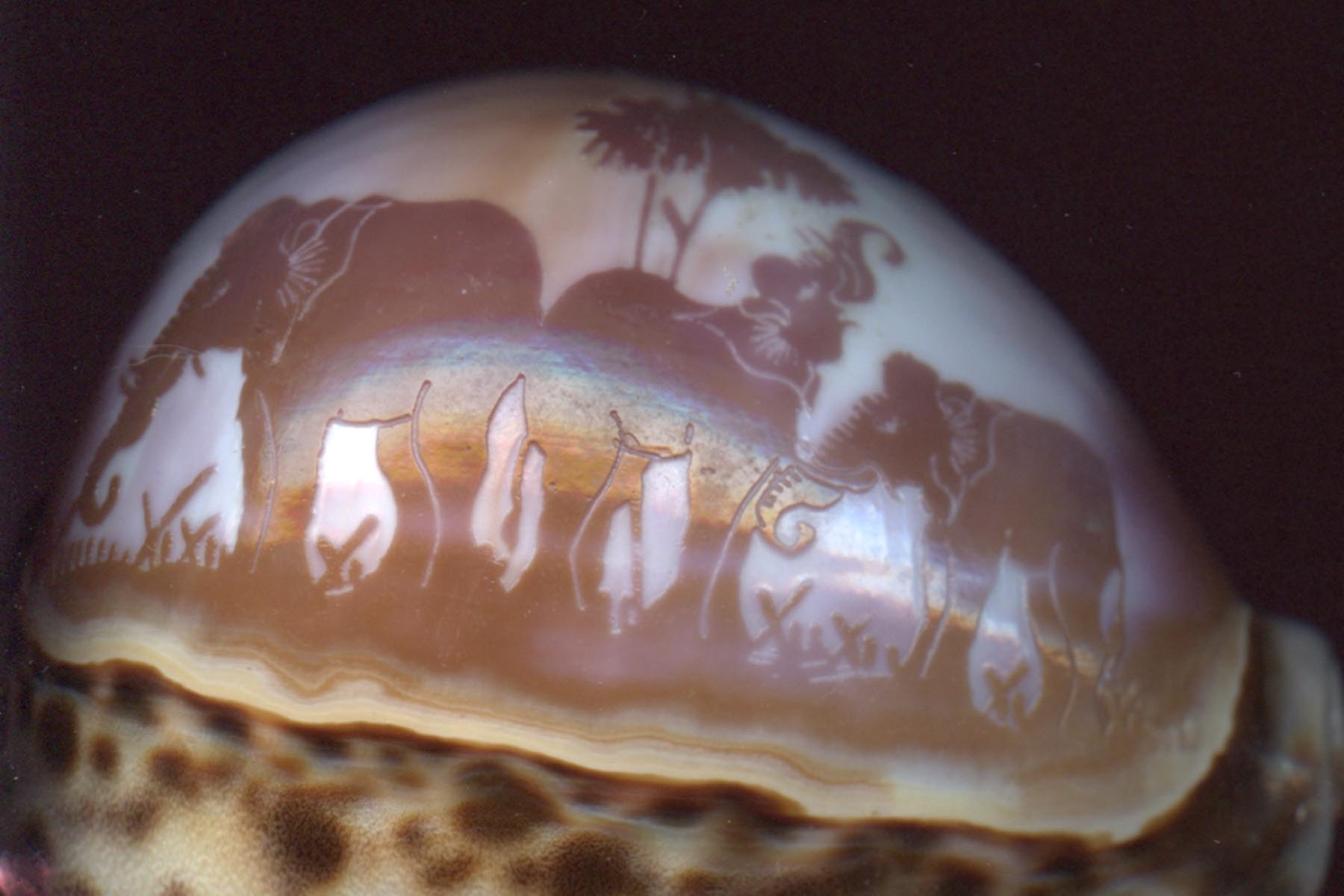
A decorative carving or cameo cut into the shell of a Cypraea tigris

Despite this species not occurring in the Mediterranean Sea, shells of the tiger cowrie and the related panther cowrie, Cypraea pantherina, have been unearthed at Pompeii, the ancient Roman city near Naples, Italy, where these shells may have been used as some form of ornament.The shells also were conceivably part of a natural history collection. An interest in natural history existed at the time, as exemplified by Pliny the Elder, who wrote extensively about seashells in his book Natural History and who died investigating the eruption of Vesuvius.

The shells of this species of cowry are still popular among shell collectors, and are also used as a decorative object, even in modern times.

The shell of C. tigris is believed to help to facilitate childbirth; some women in Japan hold a shell of this species during childbirth.

Large cowry shells such as that of this species were used in Europe in the recent past as a frame over which sock heels were stretched for darning, i.e. instead of using a darning egg. The cowry's smooth surface allows the darning needle to be positioned under the cloth more easily than when using a darning mushroom made of wood.

== Gallery ==
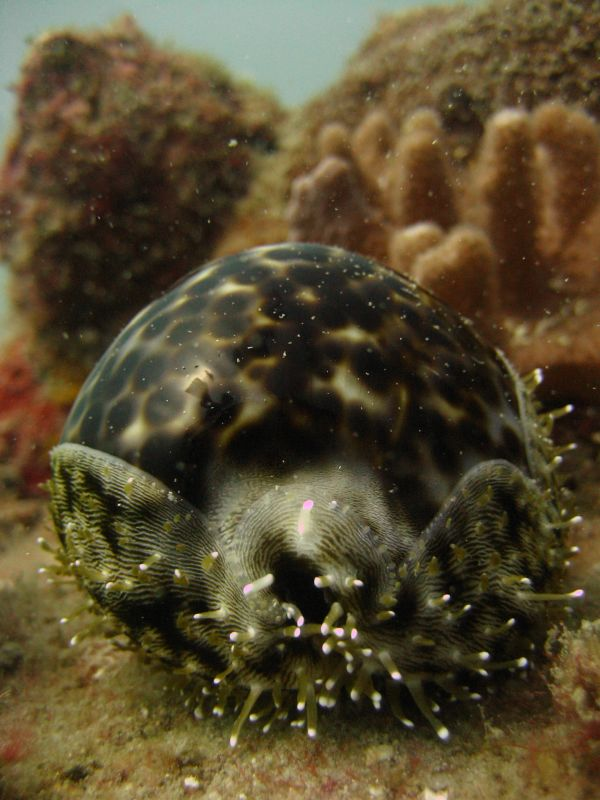
A live individual of Cypraea tigris viewed from the posterior end; note the mantle partly covering the shell.

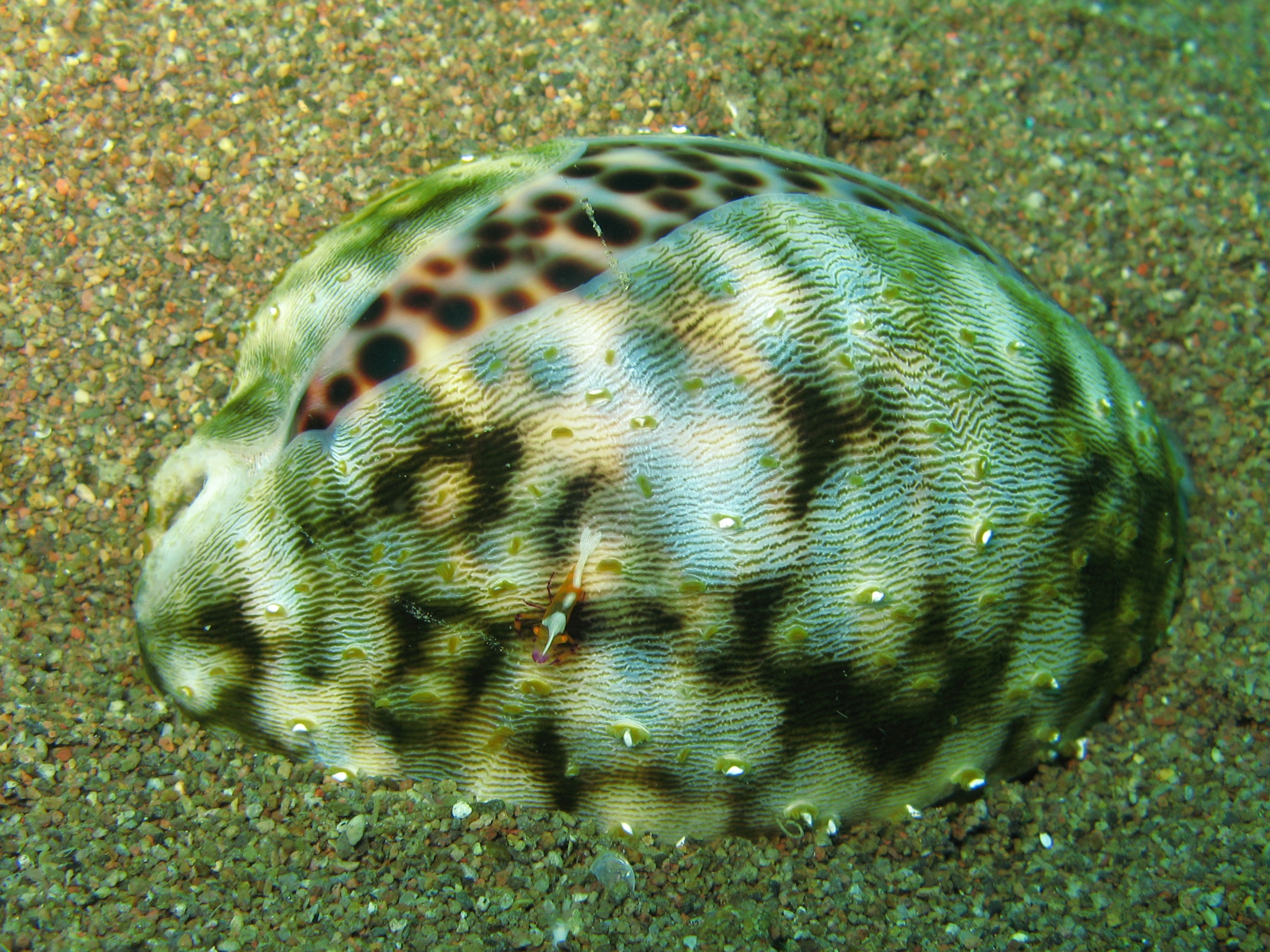
Cypraea tigris with mantle partly extended

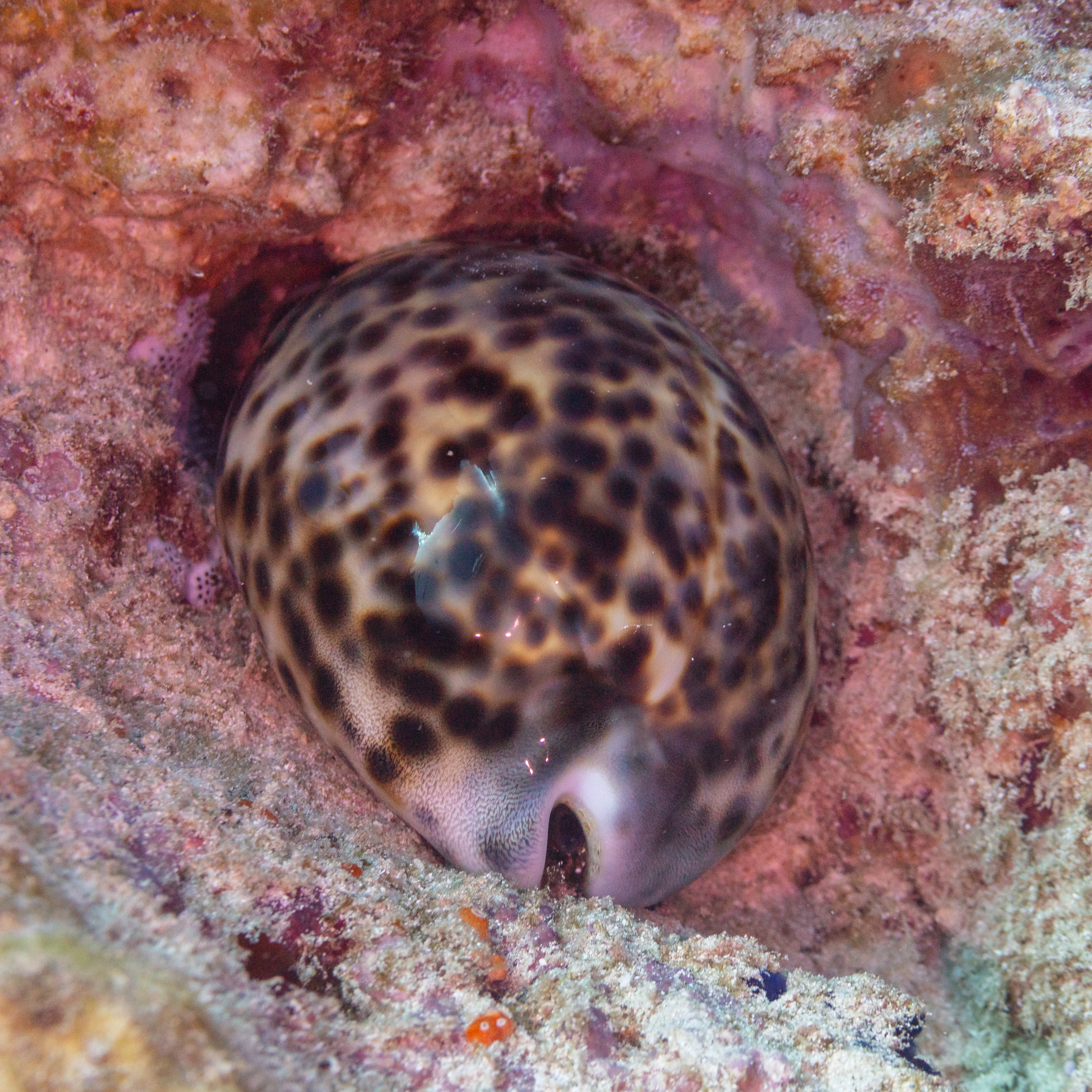
A living individual of C. tigris in Tanzania

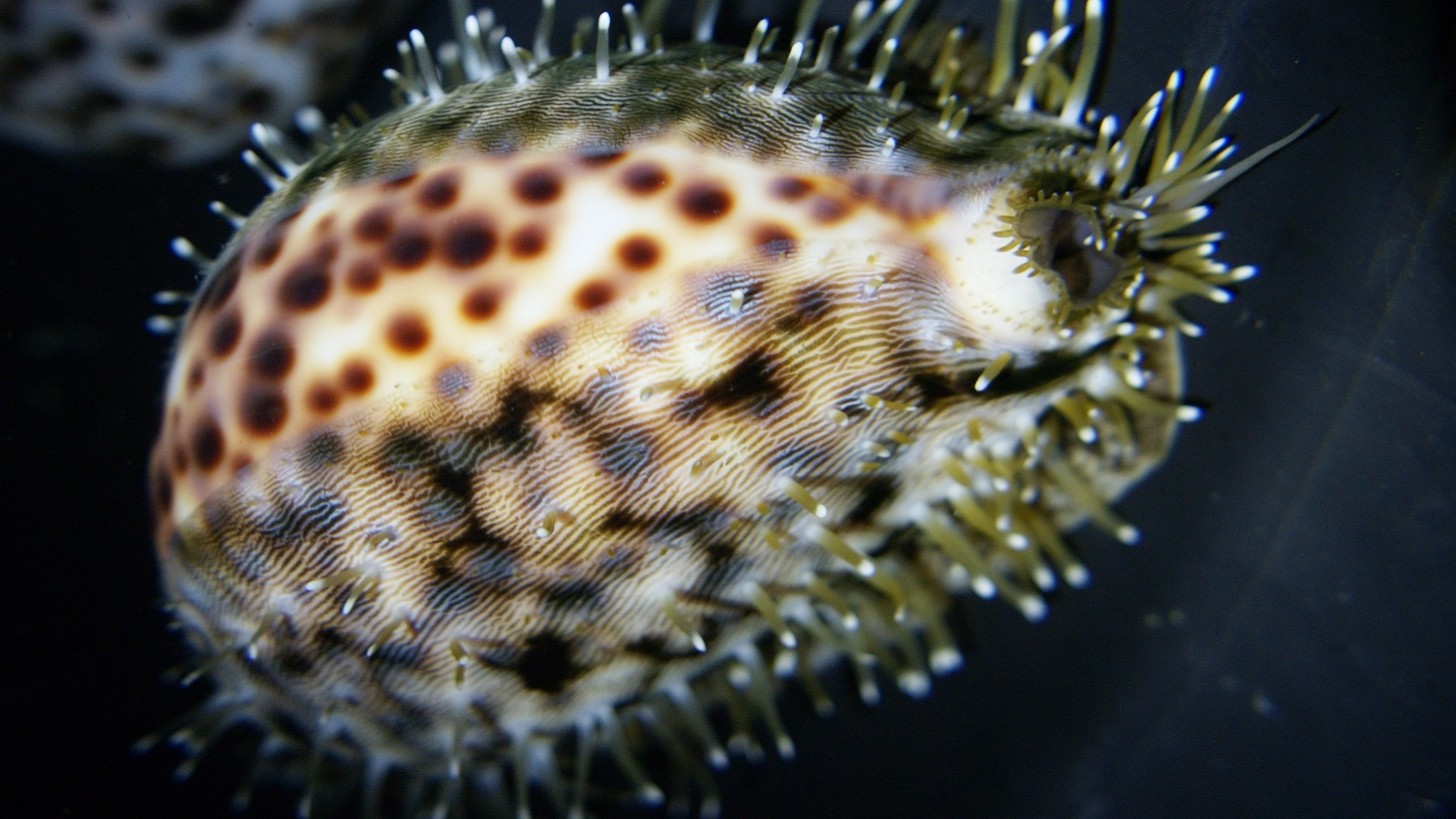
Closeup look of Cypraea tigris and its mantle with projections.

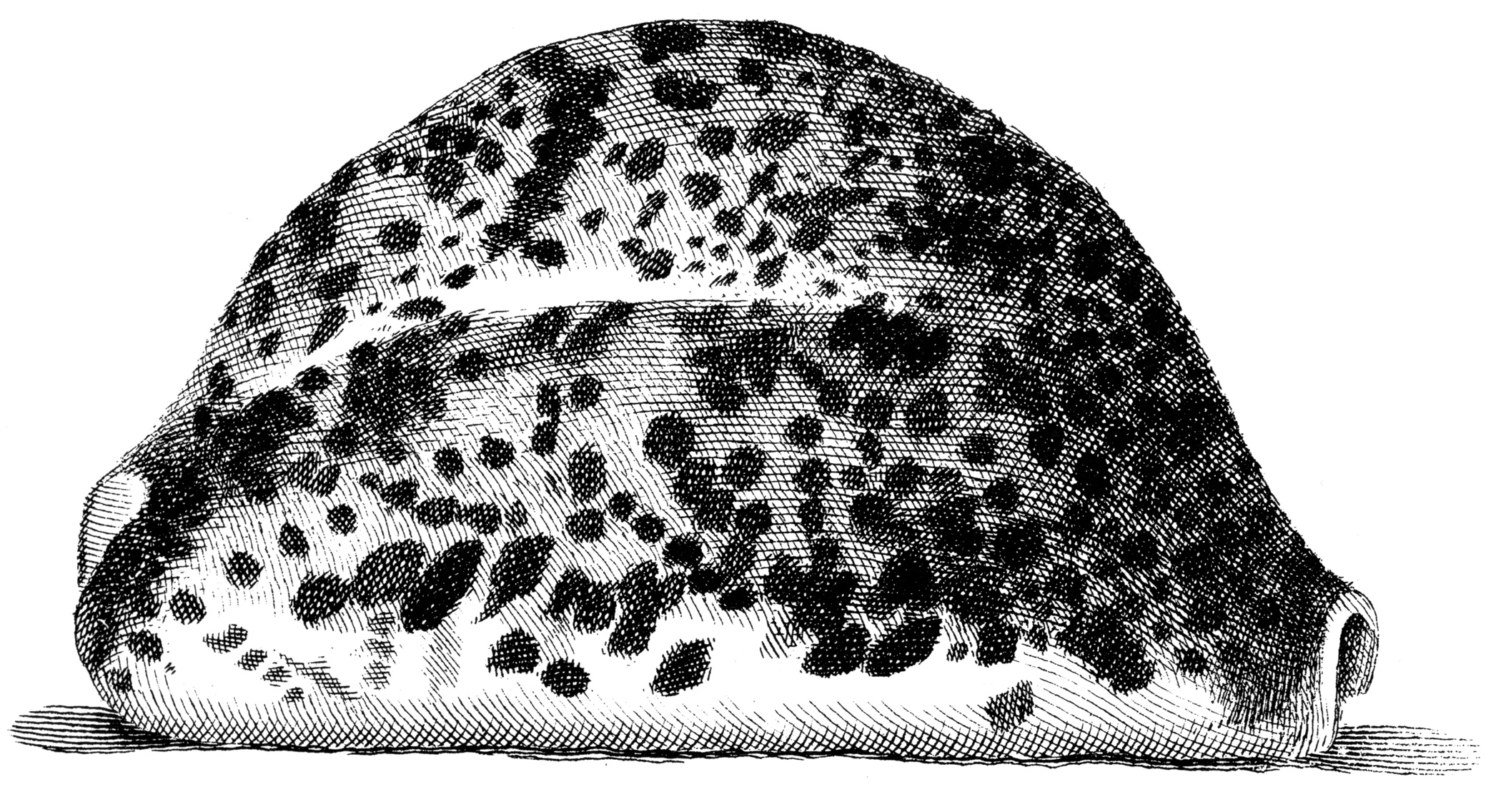
Drawing of a right-side view of the shell of C. tigris from Index Testarum Conchyliorum (1742) by Niccolò Gualtieri

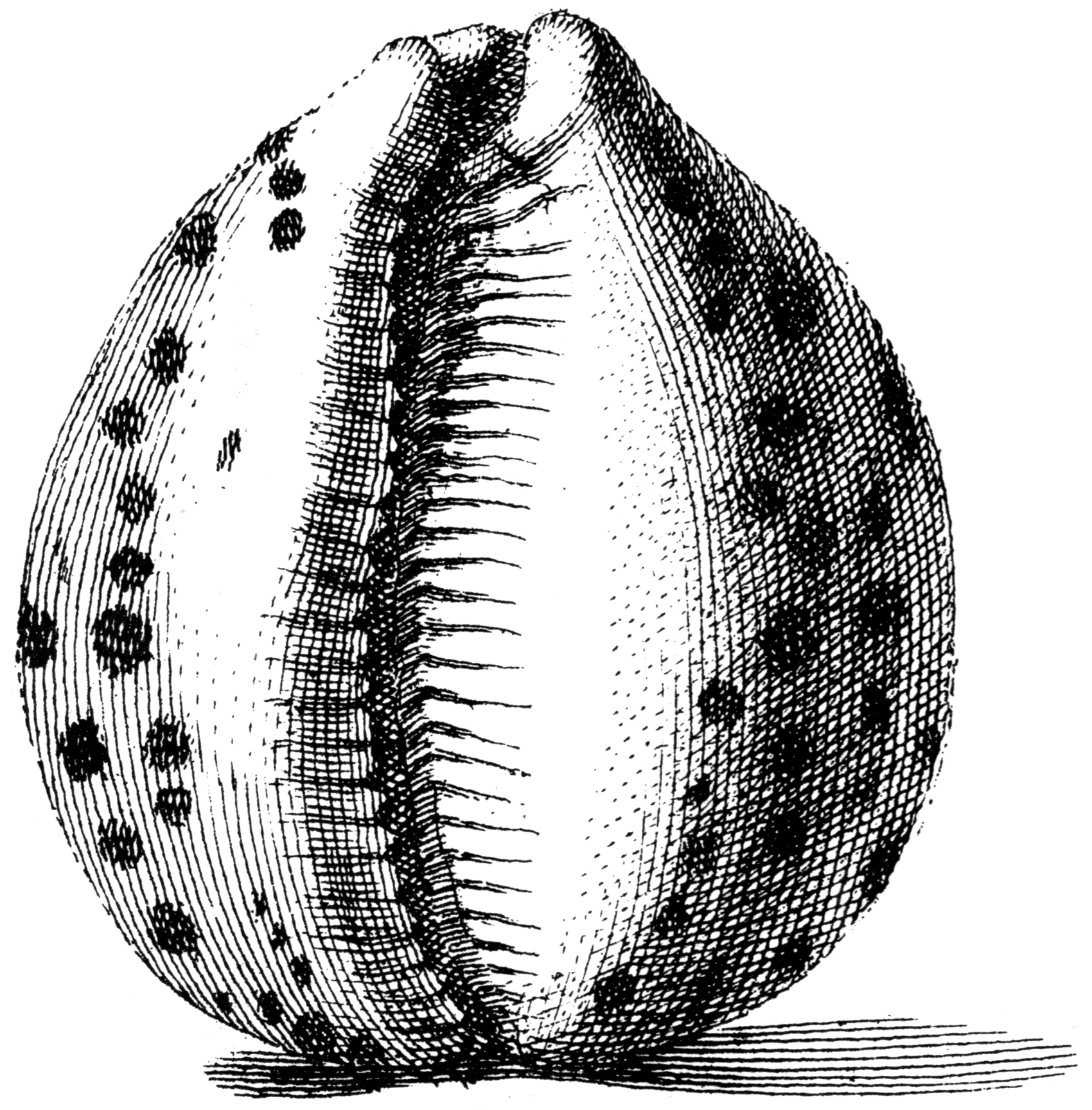
Drawing of the ventral view of a shell of C. tigris from Index Testarum Conchyliorum (1742) by Niccolò Gualtieri

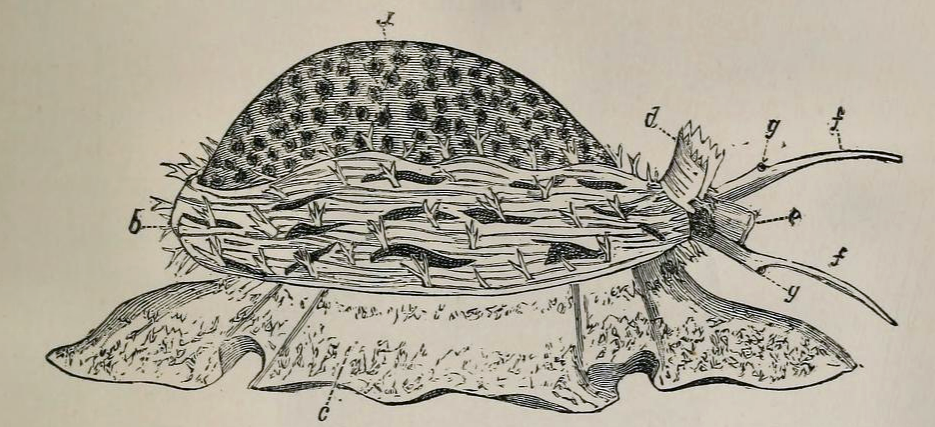
Drawing of the animal and the shell of C. tigris; a) shell, b) mantle, c) foot, d) siphon, e) proboscis, f) tentacles
