= Acetylgalactosaminyl-O-glycosyl-glycoprotein b-1,6-N-acetylglucosaminyltransferase =

Class of enzymes

Acetylgalactosaminyl-O-glycosyl-glycoprotein beta-1,6-N-acetylglucosaminyltransferase

Identifiers
- EC no.: 2.4.1.148
- CAS no.: 95978-15-7

Databases
- IntEnz: IntEnz view
- BRENDA: BRENDA entry
- ExPASy: NiceZyme view
- KEGG: KEGG entry
- MetaCyc: metabolic pathway
- PRIAM: profile
- PDB structures: RCSB PDB PDBe PDBsum
Search
- PMC: articles
- PubMed: articles
- NCBI: proteins

Acetylgalactosaminyl-O-glycosyl-glycoprotein beta-1,6-N-acetylglucosaminyltransferase (EC 2.4.1.148 with systematic name UDP-N-acetyl-D-glucosamine:N-acetyl-beta-D-glucosaminyl-(1->3)-N-acetyl-D-galactosaminyl-R 6-beta-N-acetyl-D-glucosaminyltransferase. This enzyme catalyses the following chemical reaction

UDP-N-acetyl-D-glucosamine + N-acetyl-beta-D-glucosaminyl-(1->3)-N-acetyl-D-galactosaminyl-R $\rightleftharpoons$ UDP + N-acetyl-beta-D-glucosaminyl-(1->6)-[N-acetyl-beta-D-glucosaminyl-(1->3)]-N-acetyl-D-galactosaminyl-R

== Nomenclature ==
Acetylgalactosaminyl-O-glycosyl-glycoprotein beta-1,6-N-acetylglucosaminyltransferase is also known as O-glycosyl-oligosaccharide-glycoprotein N-acetylglucosaminyltransferase IV, uridine diphosphoacetylglucosamine-mucin beta(1->6)-acetylglucosaminyltransferase B, core 4 beta6-GalNAc-transferase, core 6beta-GalNAc-transferase B, UDP-N-acetyl-D-glucosamine:O-oligosaccharide-glycoprotein (N-acetyl-D-glucosamine to N-acetyl-D-galactosamine of N-acetyl-beta-D-glucosaminyl-1,3-N-acetyl-D-galactosaminyl-R) beta-1,6-N-acetyl-D-glucosaminyltransferase).

== See also ==
- EC 2.4.1.102 (beta-1,3-galactosyl-O-glycosyl-glycoprotein beta-1,6-N-acetylglucosaminyltransferase)
- EC 2.4.1.146 (beta-1,3-galactosyl-O-glycosyl-glycoprotein beta-1,3-N-acetylglucosaminyltransferase)
- EC 2.4.1.147 (acetylgalactosaminyl-O-glycosyl-glycoprotein beta-1,3-N-acetylglucosaminyltransferase).
