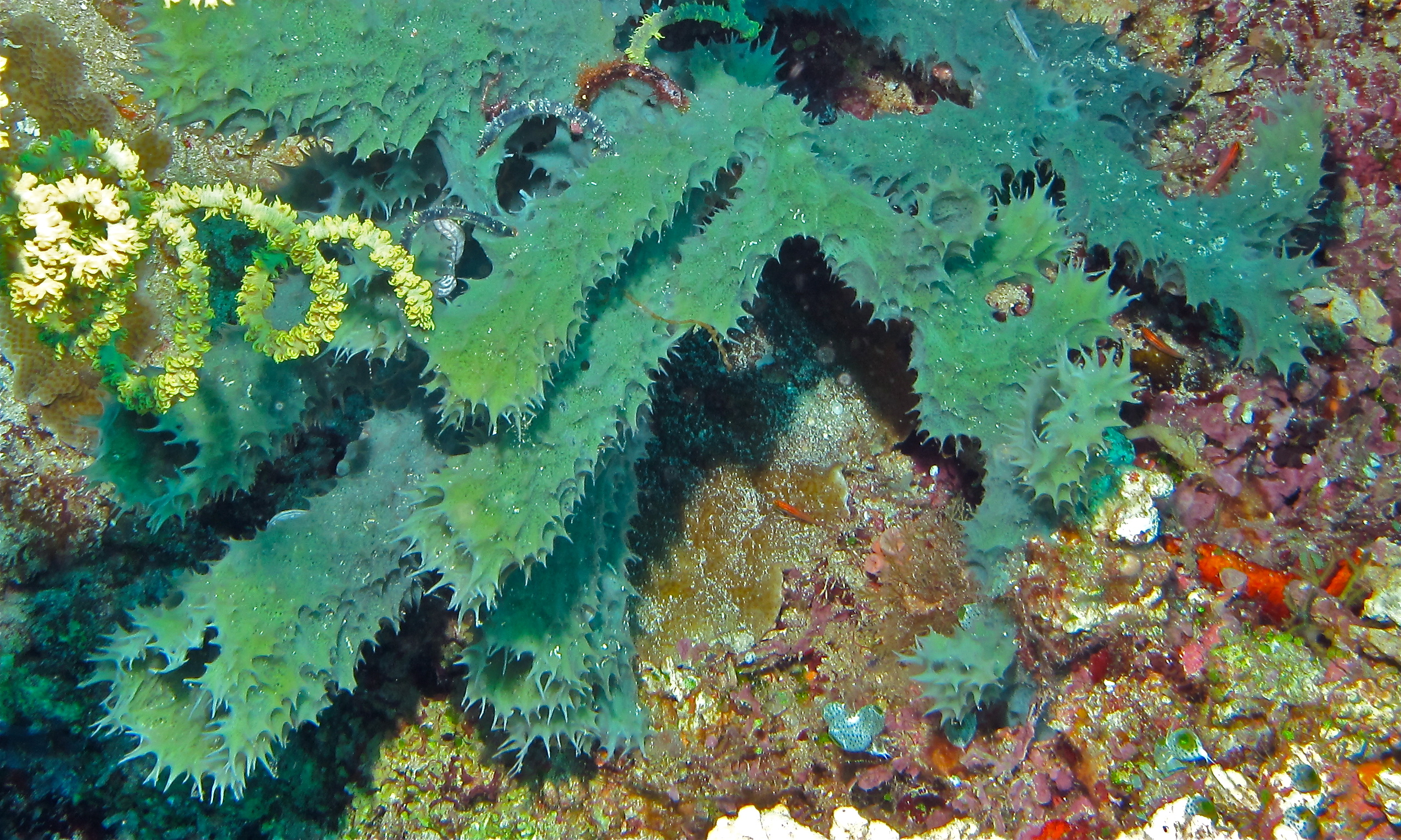
- Gelliodes fibulata

Scientific classification
- Domain: Eukaryota
- Kingdom: Animalia
- Phylum: Porifera
- Class: Demospongiae
- Order: Haplosclerida
- Family: Niphatidae
- Genus: Gelliodes; Ridley, 1884

= Gelliodes =

Genus of sponges

Gelliodes is a genus of sponges in the family Niphatidae.

== Species ==
- Gelliodes bifacialis Topsent, 1904
- Gelliodes biformis Brøndsted, 1924
- Gelliodes callista de Laubenfels, 1954
- Gelliodes carnosa Dendy, 1889
- Gelliodes coscinopora Lévi, 1969
- Gelliodes fayalensis Topsent, 1892
- Gelliodes fibroreticulata (Dendy, 1916)
- Gelliodes fibrosa Dendy, 1905
- Gelliodes fibulata (Carter, 1881)
- Gelliodes fragilis Desqueyroux-Faúndez, 1984
- Gelliodes gracilis Hentschel, 1912
- Gelliodes incrustans Dendy, 1905
- Gelliodes leucosolenia de Laubenfels, 1934
- Gelliodes licheniformis (Lamarck, 1814)
- Gelliodes luridus (Lundbeck, 1902)
- Gelliodes macrosigma Hentschel, 1912
- Gelliodes nossibea Lévi, 1956
- Gelliodes obtusa Hentschel, 1912
- Gelliodes persica Fromont, 1995
- Gelliodes petrosioides Dendy, 1905
- Gelliodes poculum Ridley & Dendy, 1886
- Gelliodes porosa Thiele, 1903
- Gelliodes pumila (Lendenfeld, 1887)
- Gelliodes ramosa Kieschnick, 1898
- Gelliodes spinosella Thiele, 1899
- Gelliodes spongiosa Topsent, 1916
- Gelliodes strongylofera Brøndsted, 1924
- Gelliodes tenuirhabdus Pulitzer-Finali, 1982
- Gelliodes truncata (Kieschnick, 1896)
- Gelliodes tubulosa Lendenfeld, 1887
- Gelliodes wilsoni Carballo, Aquilar-Camacho, Knapp & Bell, 2013
