= Gelliodes fibrosa =

Scientific classification
- Domain: Eukaryota
- Kingdom: Animalia
- Phylum: Porifera
- Class: Demospongiae
- Order: Haplosclerida
- Family: Niphatidae
- Genus: Gelliodes
- Species: G. fibrosa

Binomial name
- Gelliodes fibrosa Dendy, 1905

Species of sponge

Gelliodes fibrosa is a species of sponge found in shallow water in the Indian Ocean. It was first described in 1905 by the British zoologist Arthur Dendy, the type locality being the Gulf of Mannar, Sri Lanka. In 1925, the American zoologist Edmund Beecher Wilson described a species of sponge from North Sulawesi as Gelliodes fibrosa. In 2013, Carballo, Aquilar-Camacho, Knapp & Bell, decided that this was a homonym, a separate taxon from the original one described by Dendy, and gave the new species the name Gelliodes wilsoni.
