= Dasychalina =

Scientific classification
- Domain: Eukaryota
- Kingdom: Animalia
- Phylum: Porifera
- Class: Demospongiae
- Order: Haplosclerida
- Family: Niphatidae
- Genus: Dasychalina; Ridley & Dendy, 1886

Genus of sponges

Dasychalina is a genus of sponges in the family Niphatidae.

== Species ==
- Dasychalina fragilis Ridley & Dendy, 1886
- Dasychalina magellanica (Thiele, 1905)
- Dasychalina melior Ridley & Dendy, 1886
- Dasychalina validissima (Thiele, 1905)
