= Amphimedon massalis =

Scientific classification
- Kingdom: Animalia
- Phylum: Porifera
- Class: Demospongiae
- Order: Haplosclerida
- Family: Niphatidae
- Genus: Amphimedon
- Species: A. massalis

Binomial name
- Amphimedon massalis (Carter, 1886)

Synonyms
- Haliclona massalis (Carter, 1886); Thalysias massalis Carter, 1886

Species of sponge

Amphimedon massalis is a species of sponge in the family Niphatidae. The body of the sponge consists of silica needles and sponge fibres and is capable of taking in much water. It is distributed in Port Phillip Bay, south of Victoria, Australia.
