= Microxina myxa =

Scientific classification
- Kingdom: Animalia
- Phylum: Porifera
- Class: Demospongiae
- Order: Haplosclerida
- Family: Niphatidae
- Genus: Microxina
- Species: M. myxa

Binomial name
- Microxina myxa Goodwin, Brewin & Brickle, 2012

Species of sponge

Microxina myxa is a species of sea sponge first found on the coast of South Georgia island, in the south-western Southern Ocean.
