= Cribrochalina =

- Cribrochalina vasculum

Scientific classification
- Kingdom: Animalia
- Phylum: Porifera
- Class: Demospongiae
- Order: Haplosclerida
- Family: Niphatidae
- Genus: Cribrochalina; Schmidt, 1870

Synonyms
- Pharetronema Sollas, 1879

Genus of sponges

Cribrochalina is a genus of sponges with eight described species.

== Species ==
- Cribrochalina brassicata (Carter, 1885)
- Cribrochalina compressa (Carter, 1883)
- Cribrochalina dendyi (Whitelegge, 1901)
- Cribrochalina dura (Wilson, 1902)
- Cribrochalina punctata (Ridley & Dendy, 1886)
- Cribrochalina vasculum (Lamarck, 1814)
- Cribrochalina vasiformis (Carter, 1882)
- Cribrochalina zingiberis (Sollas, 1879)
