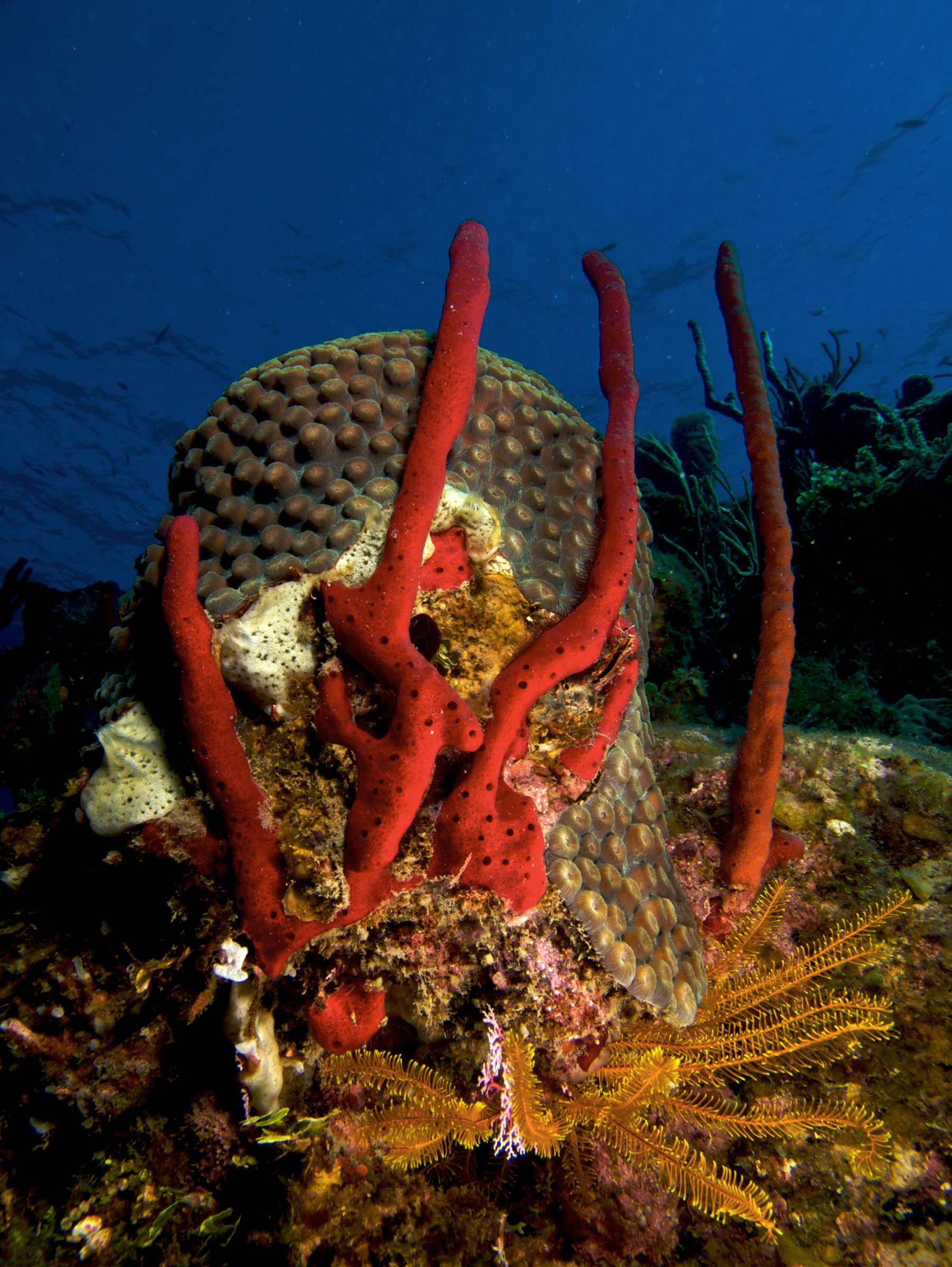
- Amphimedon compressa

Scientific classification
- Kingdom: Animalia
- Phylum: Porifera
- Class: Demospongiae
- Order: Haplosclerida
- Family: Niphatidae
- Genus: Amphimedon; Duchassaing & Michelotti, 1864

Synonyms
- Haliclona (Amphimedon) Duchassaing & Michelotti, 1864; Hemihaliclona Burton, 1937

= Amphimedon (sponge) =

Genus of sponges

Amphimedon is a genus of sponges with over 60 described species. In 2009, Amphimedon queenslandica was the first species of sponge to have its genome sequenced.

== Species ==
The following species are recognised in the genus Amphimedon:

- Amphimedon aculeata Pulitzer-Finali, 1982
- Amphimedon aitsuensis (Hoshino, 1981)
- Amphimedon alata Pulitzer-Finali, 1996
- Amphimedon anastomosa Calcinai, Bastari, Bertolino & Pansini, 2017
- Amphimedon anomala (Sarà, 1978)
- Amphimedon brevispiculifera (Dendy, 1905)
- Amphimedon calyx Goodwin, Jones, Neely & Brickle, 2011
- Amphimedon caribica (Pulitzer-Finali, 1986)
- Amphimedon cellulosa (Verrill, 1907)
- Amphimedon chinensis (Pulitzer-Finali, 1982)
- Amphimedon chloros Ilan, Gugel & van Soest, 2004
- Amphimedon complanata (Duchassaing, 1850)
- Amphimedon compressa Duchassaing & Michelotti, 1864
- Amphimedon conferta Pulitzer-Finali, 1996
- Amphimedon conica (Brøndsted, 1924)
- Amphimedon cristata Pulitzer-Finali, 1996
- Amphimedon decurtata (Sarà, 1978)
- Amphimedon delicatula (Dendy, 1889)
- Amphimedon denhartogi de Voogd, 2003
- Amphimedon dilatata Duchassaing & Michelotti, 1864
- Amphimedon dinae Helmy & van Soest, 2005
- Amphimedon dura (Verrill, 1907)
- Amphimedon elastica (Verrill, 1907)
- Amphimedon erina (de Laubenfels, 1936)
- Amphimedon estelae Santos, Docio & Pinheiro, 2014
- Amphimedon flexa (Pulitzer-Finali, 1982)
- Amphimedon hamadai Helmy & van Soest, 2005
- Amphimedon hispidula (Ridley, 1884)
- Amphimedon jalae Helmy & van Soest, 2005
- Amphimedon lamellata Fromont, 1993
- Amphimedon leprosa Duchassaing & Michelotti, 1864
- Amphimedon maresi (Sarà, 1978)
- Amphimedon massalis (Carter, 1886)
- Amphimedon micropora (Verrill, 1907)
- Amphimedon minuta Cuartas, 1988
- Amphimedon mollis (Wilson, 1902)
- Amphimedon nanaspiculata (Hartman, 1955)
- Amphimedon navalis Pulitzer-Finali, 1993
- Amphimedon ochracea (Keller, 1889)
- Amphimedon paradisus Desqueyroux-Faúndez, 1989
- Amphimedon paraviridis Fromont, 1993
- Amphimedon queenslandica Hooper & van Soest, 2006
- Amphimedon reticulosa (Thiele, 1905)
- Amphimedon robusta (Carter, 1885)
- Amphimedon rubens (Pallas, 1766)
- Amphimedon rubida Pulitzer-Finali, 1993
- Amphimedon rubiginosa Pulitzer-Finali, 1993
- Amphimedon rudis Pulitzer-Finali, 1996
- Amphimedon spiculosa (Dendy, 1887)
- Amphimedon spinosa Pulitzer-Finali, 1993
- Amphimedon strongylata Pulitzer-Finali, 1996
- Amphimedon subcylindrica (Dendy, 1905)
- Amphimedon sulcata Fromont, 1993
- Amphimedon texotli Cruz-Barraza & Carballo, 2008
- Amphimedon trindanea (Ristau, 1978)
- Amphimedon viridis Duchassaing & Michelotti, 1864
- Amphimedon zamboangae (Lévi, 1961)
