= 1,8-Diazabicyclo(5.4.0)undec-7-ene =

Chemical compound

1,8-Diazabicyclo[5.4.0]undec-7-ene

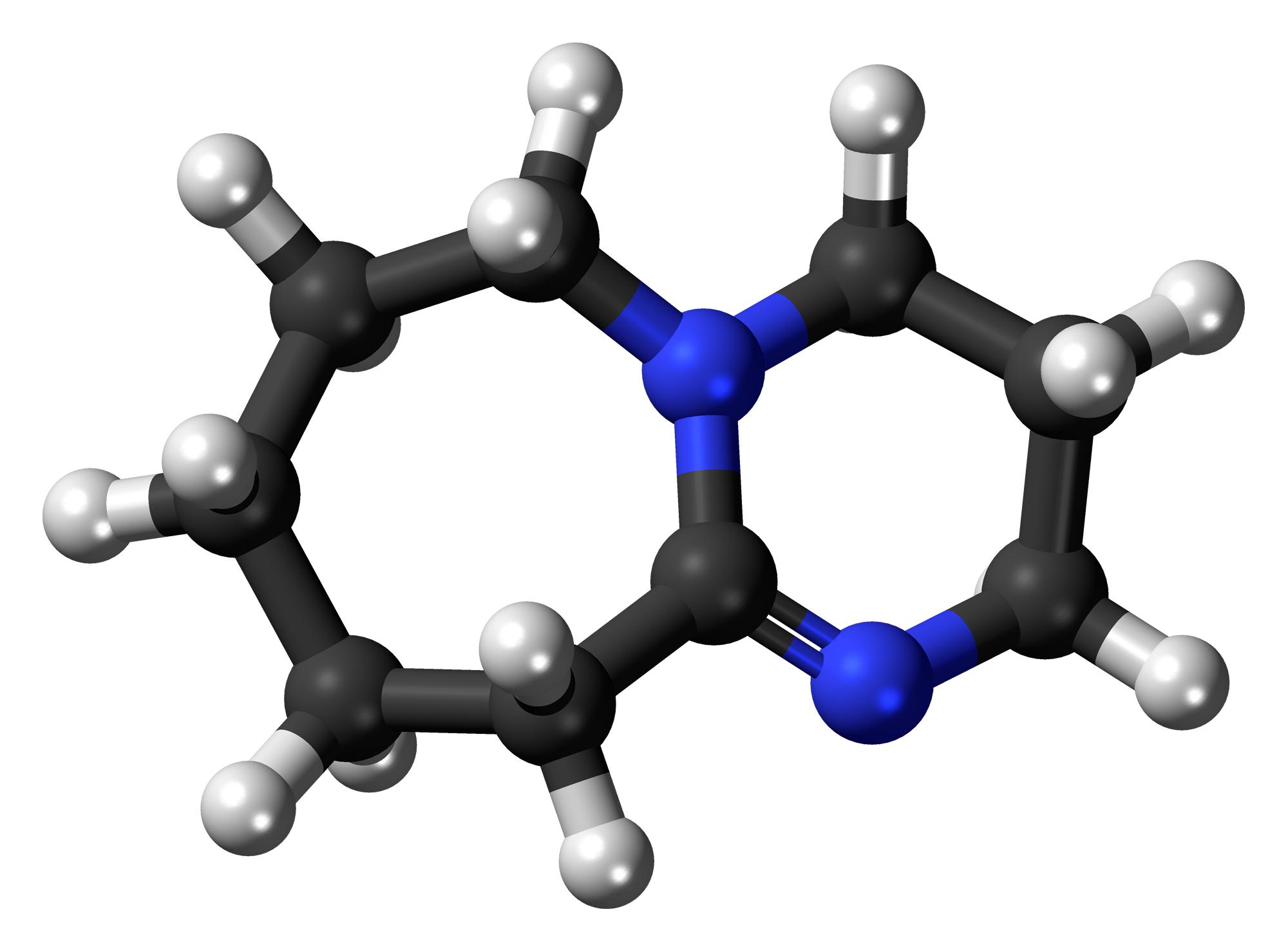

Names
- Preferred IUPAC name 2,3,4,6,7,8,9,10-Octahydropyrimido[1,2-a]azepine
- Other names DBU, Diazabicycloundecene

Identifiers
CAS Number	6674-22-2
3D model (JSmol)	Interactive image
ChemSpider	73246
ECHA InfoCard	100.027.013
EC Number	229-713-7
PubChem CID	81184
UNII	H1ILJ6IBUX
CompTox Dashboard (EPA)	DTXSID2049424
- InChI: InChI=1S/C9H16N2/c1-2-5-9-10-6-4-8-11(9)7-3-1/h1-8H2 Key: GQHTUMJGOHRCHB-UHFFFAOYSA-N; InChI=1/C9H16N2/c1-2-5-9-10-6-4-8-11(9)7-3-1/h1-8H2 Key: GQHTUMJGOHRCHB-UHFFFAOYAM
- SMILES: N\2=C1\N(CCCCC1)CCC/2

Properties
Chemical formula	C_{9}H_{16}N_{2}
Molar mass	152.241 g·mol^{−1}
Appearance	Colorless liquid
Density	1.018 g/mL liquid
Melting point	−70 °C (−94 °F; 203 K)
Boiling point	261 °C (502 °F; 534 K) (1 atm), 80 to 83 °C (0.6 mmHg)
Solubility in water	ethers, alcohols
Acidity (pK_{a})	13.5±1.5 (pK_{a} of conjugate acid in water); 24.34 (pK_{a} of conjugate acid in acetonitrile)

Hazards
- GHS labelling
Pictograms	(GHS05: Corrosive) (GHS06: Toxic) (GHS07: Exclamation mark)
Signal word	Danger
Hazard statements	H301, H302, H312, H314, H412
Precautionary statements	P260, P264, P270, P273, P280, P301+P310, P301+P312, P301+P330+P331, P302+P352, P303+P361+P353, P304+P340, P305+P351+P338, P310, P312, P321, P322, P330, P363, P405, P501
Flash point	119.9 °C (247.8 °F; 393.0 K)
- Except where otherwise noted, data are given for materials in their standard state (at 25 °C [77 °F], 100 kPa). verify (what is ?) Infobox references

1,8-Diazabicyclo[5.4.0]undec-7-ene, or more commonly DBU, is a chemical compound and belongs to the class of amidine compounds. It is used in organic synthesis as a catalyst, a complexing ligand, and a non-nucleophilic base.

== Synthesis ==
DBU can be synthesised in three steps from caprolactam and acrylonitrile. First, the nitrile undergoes an addition reaction at the caprolactam nitrogen, producing N-(2-cyanoethyl)-caprolactam. This is then hydrogenated to N-aminopropyl-caprolactam, followed by an intramolecular carbonyl condensation to form the imine. Water is removed by fractional distillation.

== Occurrence ==
Although all commercially available DBU is produced synthetically, it may also be isolated from the sea sponge Niphates digitalis. The biosynthesis of DBU has been proposed to begin with adipaldehyde and 1,3-diaminopropane.

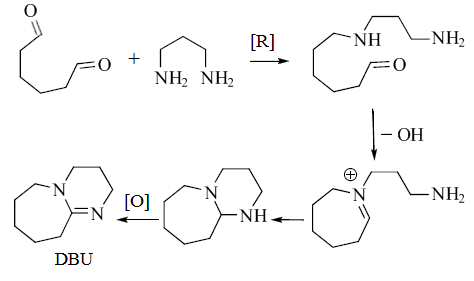
Proposed pathway for the biosynthesis of DBU in sponges.

== Applications ==
DBU is used:

- As a reagent in organic chemistry, where DBU is used as a ligand and base. As a base, protonation occurs at the imine nitrogen. Lewis acids also attach to the same nitrogen.
- As a catalyst, for example as a curing agent for epoxy resins and polyurethane.
- In the separation of fullerenes in conjunction with trimethylbenzene. It reacts with C_{70} and higher fullerenes, but not with C_{60}.
- As a dehydrohalogenation agent.
- In surface activation products (primers) for low-surface energy plastics and elastomers (such as PTFE, HDPE, PP, and silicone rubber), where DBU raises the surface energy enough for adhesives (such as cyanoacrylate and contact cement) to bond to these otherwise inert, non-stick materials.

== See also ==
- 1,5-Diazabicyclo[4.3.0]non-5-ene
- DABCO
