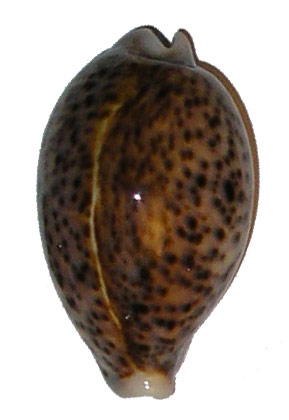
- Dorsal view of a shell of Cypraea pantherina, anterior end towards the bottom

Scientific classification
- Kingdom: Animalia
- Phylum: Mollusca
- Class: Gastropoda
- Subclass: Caenogastropoda
- Order: Littorinimorpha
- Family: Cypraeidae
- Genus: Cypraea
- Species: C. pantherina

Binomial name
- Cypraea pantherina Lightfoot, 1786

= Cypraea pantherina =

Species of gastropod

Cypraea pantherina, common name the panther cowry, is a species of large tropical sea snail, a cowry, a marine gastropod mollusc in the family Cypraeidae, the cowries. The panther cowry is one of only two species currently included in the genus Cypraea (the second species is Cypraea tigris, Linnaeus, 1758), as all other species previously belonging to the genus Cypraea have been reassigned to other genera within the family Cypraeidae.

Shells of Cypraea pantherina have been found in tombs in the Rhine valley dated to 6 BCE. Furthermore, shells of this species and the related Cypraea tigris have been unearthed at Pompeii, the ancient Roman city near Naples, Italy, where these shells may have been used as an ornament.

== Description ==
This quite common species looks very similar to Cypraea tigris, but its shell is more slender and lighter. The shells of Cypraea pantherina reach on average 57–65 millimetres (2.2–2.6 in) of length, with a minimum size of 37 millimetres (1.5 in) and a maximum size of 118 millimetres (4.6 in). The shape of these shells is roughly elongate-pyriform. They are quite heavy for their size. The dorsum surface is smooth and shiny, usually whitish or pale brown, densely covered with dark brown circular spots. A blurred longitudinal reddish line runs along the midline where the two halves of the mantle meet in life.

However, the basic colors of the shell are very variable, as they range from melanic or chestnut red to albino. The lower margins are rounded and the ventral side is white or whitish, with several long and fine teeth along the aperture.

In live animals the mantle is thin and quite transparent, with many longitudinal slight lines and numerous long and white sensorial papillae. The lateral extensions of the mantle may cover the shell completely, meeting at the midline of the dorsum. The mantle can also be withdrawn into the shell opening when the cowry is threatened.

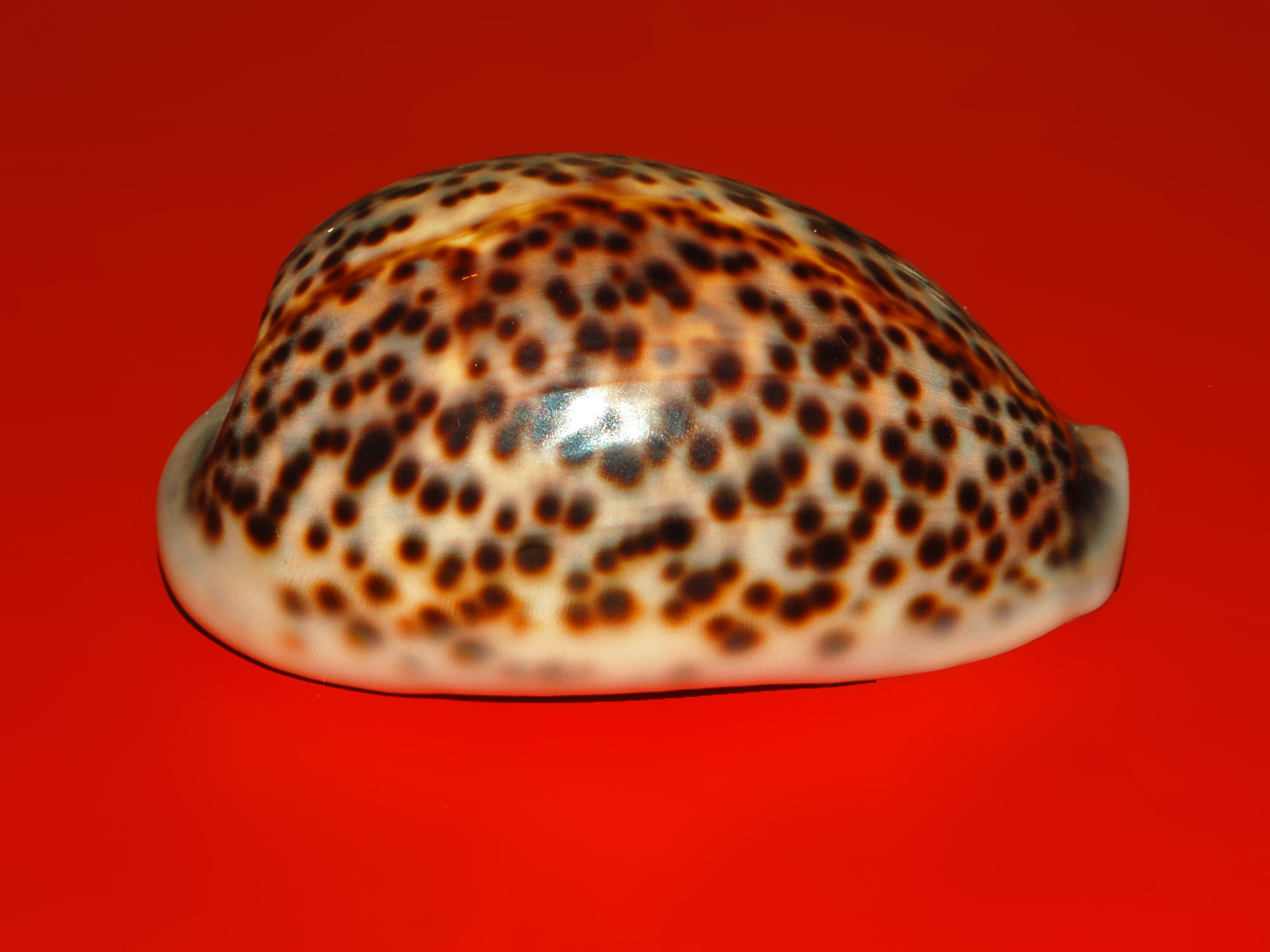
A shell of Cypraea pantherina from Sudan, lateral view, anterior end towards the right

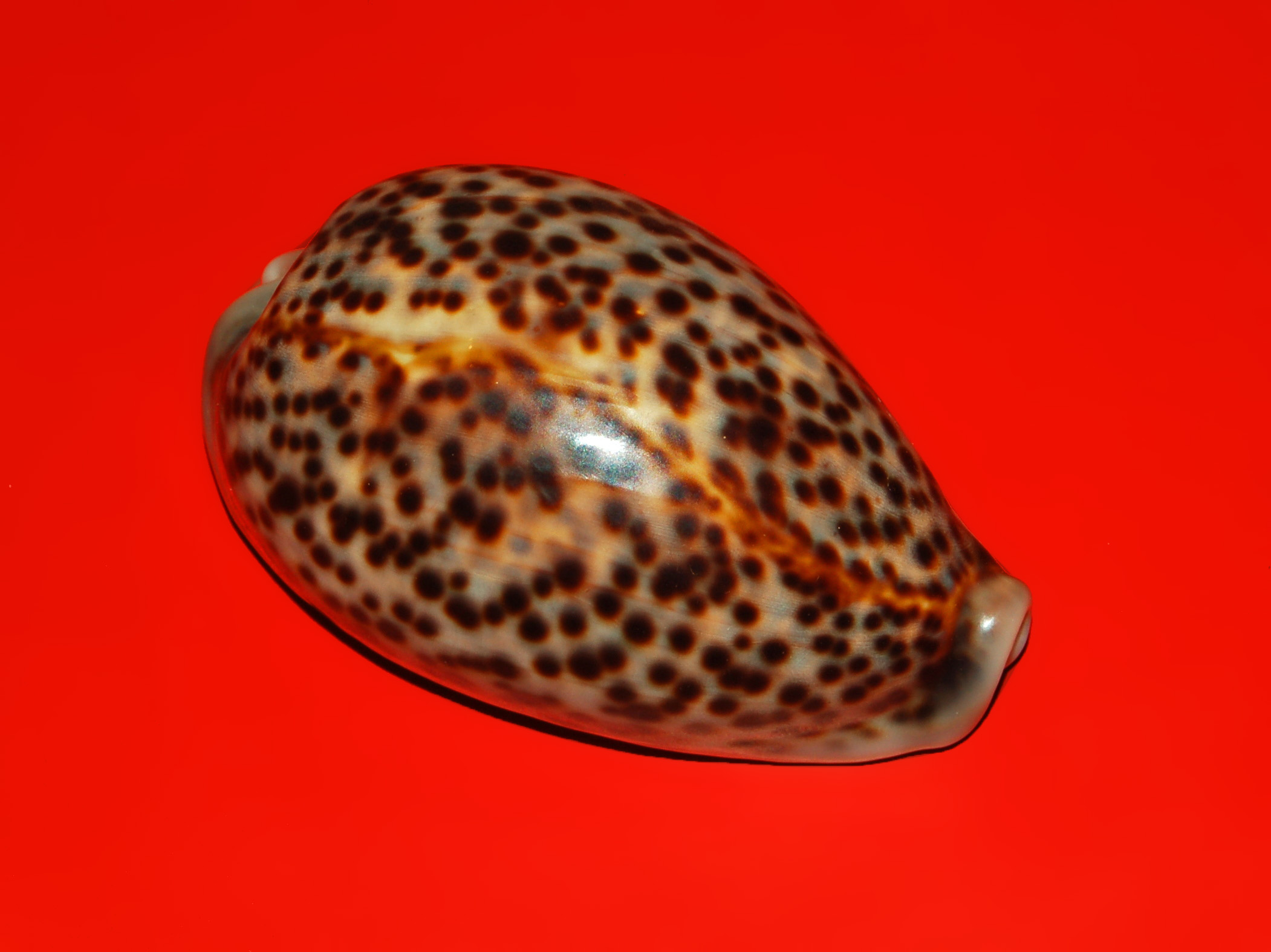
Dorsal view of shells of Cypraea pantherina from Sudan, anterior end towards the right

Cypraea pantherina var. albonitens

== Distribution ==
The panther cowry is endemic to the Red Sea (off Egypt and Sudan), Gulf of Aqaba, Dahlak Islands and Gulf of Aden). Its range does not overlap with Cypraea tigris. This species has also become established in the Mediterranean Sea (Lampedusa Island and Malta), probably having entered through the Suez Canal.

== Habitat ==
Cypraea pantherina lives in clear water at 3–40 metres (9.8–131.2 ft) of depth, mainly on coral colonies or sandy sea floor, feeding on coral polyps, various invertebrates and algae, but also on dead organic matter.

== Subspecies and forms ==
- Cypraea pantherina pantherina Lightfoot, 1786
  - Cypraea pantherina pantherina form albonitens Melvill, J.C., 1888
  - Cypraea pantherina pantherina form catulus Schilder, F.A., 1924
  - Cypraea pantherina pantherina form funebralis Sulliotti, G.R., 1924
  - Cypraea pantherina pantherina form nigrovinosa Vayssière, A.J.B.M., 1923
- Cypraea pantherina rasnasraniensis Heiman & Mienis, 2001
