= Microxina =

Scientific classification
- Kingdom: Animalia
- Phylum: Porifera
- Class: Demospongiae
- Order: Haplosclerida
- Family: Niphatidae
- Genus: Microxina; Topsent, 1916

Genus of sponges

Microxina is a genus of sponges belonging to the family Niphatidae.

The species of this genus are found in Southern South Hemisphere.

Species:

- Microxina benedeni (Topsent, 1901)
- Microxina charcoti Topsent, 1916
- Microxina lanceolata Calcinai & Pansini, 2000
- Microxina myxa Goodwin, Brewin & Brickle, 2012
- Microxina phakellioides (Kirkpatrick, 1907)
- Microxina sarai Calcinai & Pansini, 2000
- Microxina simplex (Topsent, 1916)
- Microxina subtilis (Pulitzer-Finali, 1982)
