= Niphates (sponge) =

- Niphates digitalis

Scientific classification
- Kingdom: Animalia
- Phylum: Porifera
- Class: Demospongiae
- Order: Haplosclerida
- Family: Niphatidae
- Genus: Niphates; Duchassaing & Michelotti, 1864

Synonyms
- Nyphates Duchassaing & Michelotti, 1864

Genus of sea sponges

Niphates is a genus of sea sponges belonging to the family Niphatidae. It is native to the Florida Keys, The Bahamas, and the Caribbean including the Netherlands Antilles, as well as seas around China and St. Martin's Island in the Bay of Bengal, Bangladesh.

== Species ==
- Niphates aga
- Niphates alba
- Niphates amorpha
- Niphates arenata
- Niphates caycedoi
- Niphates digitalis
- Niphates erecta
- Niphates laminaris
- Niphates lunisimilis
- Niphates olemda
- Niphates plumosa
- Niphates ruthecitae
- Niphates toxifera
