= Gelliodes wilsoni =

Scientific classification
- Domain: Eukaryota
- Kingdom: Animalia
- Phylum: Porifera
- Class: Demospongiae
- Order: Haplosclerida
- Family: Niphatidae
- Genus: Gelliodes
- Species: G. wilsoni

Binomial name
- Gelliodes wilsoni Carballo, Aquilar-Camacho, Knapp & Bell, 2013

Species of sponge

Gelliodes wilsoni, sometimes known as the gray encrusting sponge, is a species of sponge found in shallow water in the Philippines. It was first described in 1925 by the American zoologist Edmund Beecher Wilson, the type locality being North Sulawesi. He gave it the name Gelliodes fibrosa, a name already used in 1905 for a species in the Gulf of Mannar, Sri Lanka. In 2013, Carballo, Aquilar-Camacho, Knapp & Bell, decided that this was a homonym, a separate taxon from the original one given that name, and gave the new species the name Gelliodes wilsoni.

== Description ==
Gelliodes wilsoni varies somewhat in growth form but is usually found as a thick encrusting mat with irregular branches that overgrow each other, sometimes joining together, and sometimes forming short erect branches. It is usually bluish-grey, with a beige-grey interior. The texture is spongy but fibrous, elastic and tough and the surface may be smooth or may have irregular tufts of fibres protruding.

== Distribution and habitat ==
G. wilsoni was originally known from the Philippines. It has spread to Hawaii as an invasive species, where it is now present on Oahu, Kauai, and Maui; original introduction may have been on the hull of a floating dry dock. In the Hawaiian Islands it is mainly present as part of the fouling community on piers, harbour structures and floating docks. In Kaneohe Bay and other locations, it is present on patch reefs, and may encrust the shaded lower surfaces of plate corals.

Specimens of a sponge presumed to be identical to G. wilsoni have been found in other locations across the Pacific Ocean; these include Guam in the western Pacific, Palmyra Atoll in the central Pacific, and Acapulco Bay and the Baja Peninsula in the eastern Pacific. These sightings appear to be linked to international transport, as the reproductive ability of this sponge would only allow it to disperse locally.
