= Loisette M. Marsh =

Canadian born Australian marine biologist (1928–2021)

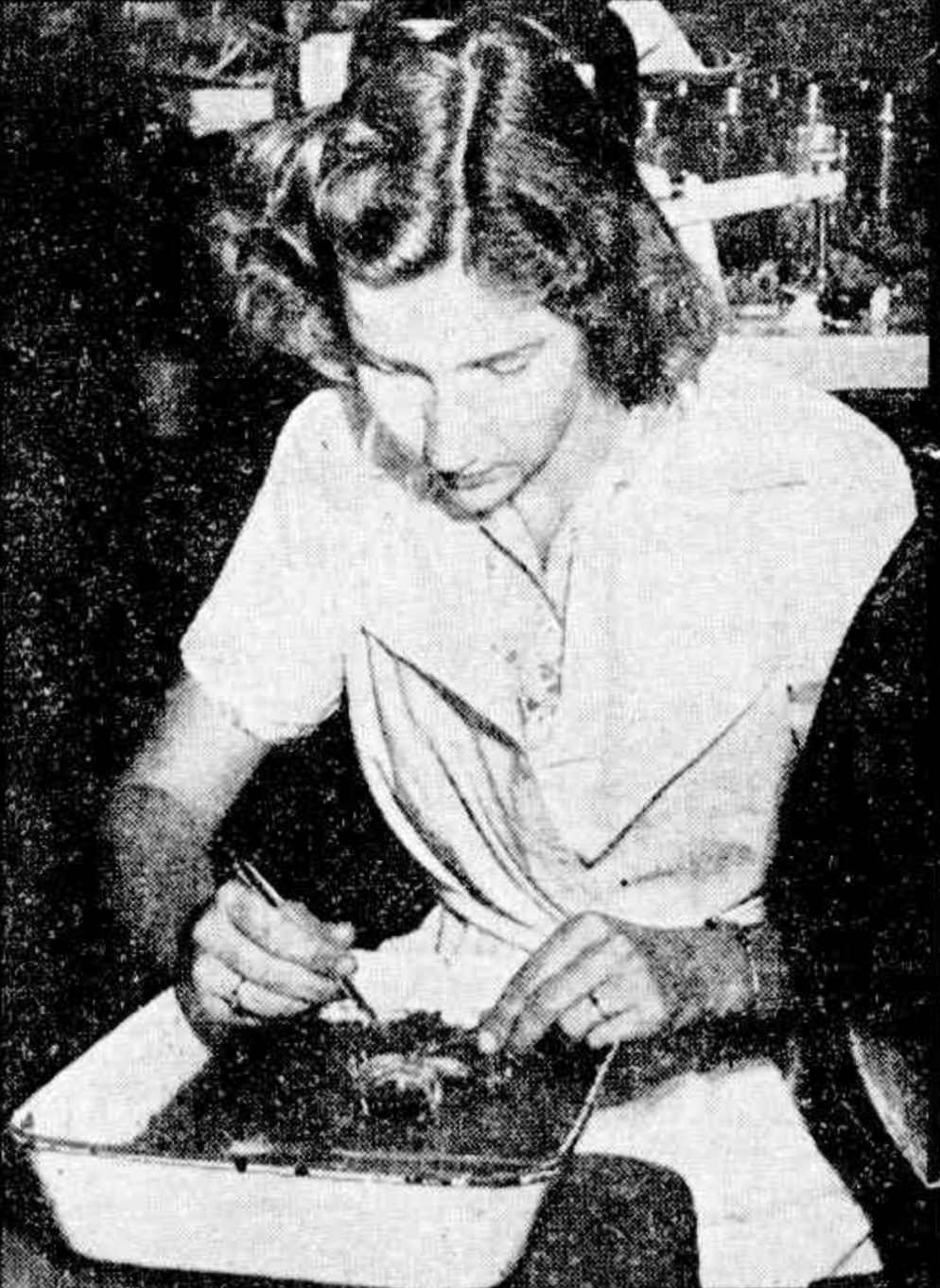
- Born: 3 October 1928; Mill Bay
- Died: 20 May 2021; Cottesloe
- Education: Methodist Ladies' College, University of Western Australia, University of Western Australia
- Occupations: Zoologist, scientific collector
- Employers: Western Australian Museum (1974–1977); Western Australian Museum (1977–1993)
- Awards: Member of the Order of Australia (For significant service to marine science and zoology., The late Mrs Loisette Matilda MARSH, 2021); Whitley Awards (2021)

Loisette M. Marsh (1928–2021) was a Canadian-born Australian marine biologist.

== Early life and education ==
Born Loisette Matilda Rutt in Mill Bay, British Columbia, she was an only child, who spent her earliest years exploring the sea and seashore adjacent to her home. At age 10 (1938) she migrated to Australia with her parents, and was educated at MLC, Perth, and then at the University of Western Australia, where she earned a B.A., followed by an M.A. in 1955.

She married Brian Marsh and together in 1960 they moved to Norfolk Island and then to Fiji in 1963. She returned to Perth in 1968, where she again became a part-time demonstrator at UWA ( 1968-1969).

== Career ==
She joined the Western Australian Museum first as a part-time graduate assistant (1970-1973), becoming assistant curator marine invertebrates (1974-1977) and finally curator of marine invertebrates (1977-1993).

In addition to her published research, she left 16 volumes of field notes, covering field work from 1972-1982 in the Fremantle area, off the shores the Western Australian coastline, including the Abrolhos Islands, Guam, Indonesia, Europe, Torres Strait, North-West Cape, New Guinea, and other places.

== Recognition ==
She was awarded an AM in 2021 for services to marine science and zoology, and the Whitley Award in 2021 for the field guide she co-authored with Jane Fromont, Field Guide to the Shallow Water Seastars of Australia.
