= Acetylgalactosaminyl-O-glycosyl-glycoprotein b-1,3-N-acetylglucosaminyltransferase =

Class of enzymes

Acetylgalactosaminyl-O-glycosyl-glycoprotein beta-1,3-N-acetylglucosaminyltransferase

Identifiers
- EC no.: 2.4.1.147
- CAS no.: 87927-96-6

Databases
- IntEnz: IntEnz view
- BRENDA: BRENDA entry
- ExPASy: NiceZyme view
- KEGG: KEGG entry
- MetaCyc: metabolic pathway
- PRIAM: profile
- PDB structures: RCSB PDB PDBe PDBsum
Search
- PMC: articles
- PubMed: articles
- NCBI: proteins

Acetylgalactosaminyl-O-glycosyl-glycoprotein beta-1,3-N-acetylglucosaminyltransferase (EC 2.4.1.147, O-glycosyl-oligosaccharide-glycoprotein N-acetylglucosaminyltransferase III, uridine diphosphoacetylglucosamine-mucin beta(1->3)-acetylglucosaminyltransferase, mucin core 3 beta3-GlcNAc-transferase, Core 3beta-GlcNAc-transferase, UDP-N-acetyl-D-glucosamine:O-glycosyl-glycoprotein (N-acetyl-D-glucosamine to N-acetyl-D-galactosaminyl-R) beta-1,3-N-acetyl-D-glucosaminyltransferase) is an enzyme with systematic name UDP-N-acetyl-D-glucosamine:N-acetyl-beta-D-galactosaminyl-R 3-beta-N-acetyl-D-glucosaminyltransferase. This enzyme catalyses the following chemical reaction

UDP-N-acetyl-D-glucosamine + N-acetyl-beta-D-galactosaminyl-R $\rightleftharpoons$ UDP + N-acetyl-beta-D-glucosaminyl-(1->3)-N-acetyl-beta-D-galactosaminyl-R

== See also ==
- EC 2.4.1.102 (beta-1,3-galactosyl-O-glycosyl-glycoprotein beta-1,6-N-acetylglucosaminyltransferase)
- EC 2.4.1.146 (beta-1,3-galactosyl-O-glycosyl-glycoprotein beta-1,3-N-acetylglucosaminyltransferase)
- EC 2.4.1.148 (acetylgalactosaminyl-O-glycosyl-glycoprotein beta-1,6-N-acetylglucosaminyltransferase).
