= SCYL3 =

Protein-coding gene in humans

Identifiers
- Aliases: SCYL3, PACE-1, PACE1, SCY1 like pseudokinase 3
- External IDs: OMIM: 608192; MGI: 1921385; GeneCards: SCYL3

Gene location (Human)
Chr.	Chromosome 1 (human)
Band	1q24.2	Start	169,849,631 bp
Band	1q24.2	End	169,894,267 bp

Gene location (Mouse)
Chr.	Chromosome 1 (mouse)
Band	1|1 H2.1- H2.2	Start	163,756,669 bp
Band	1|1 H2.1- H2.2	End	163,782,695 bp
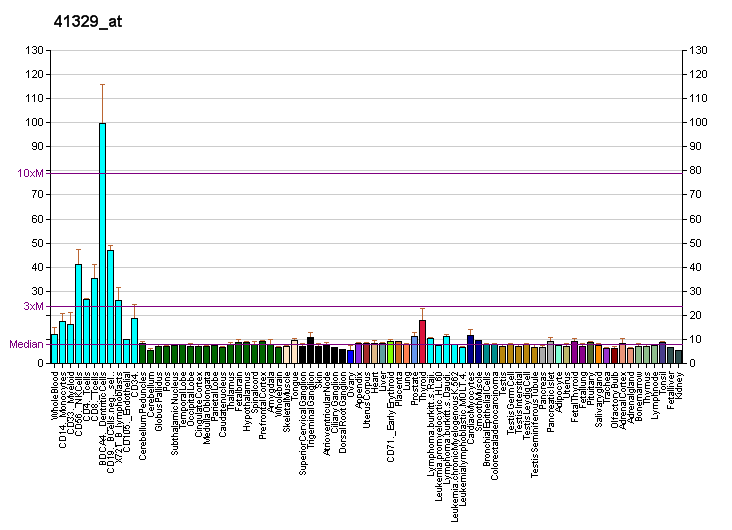

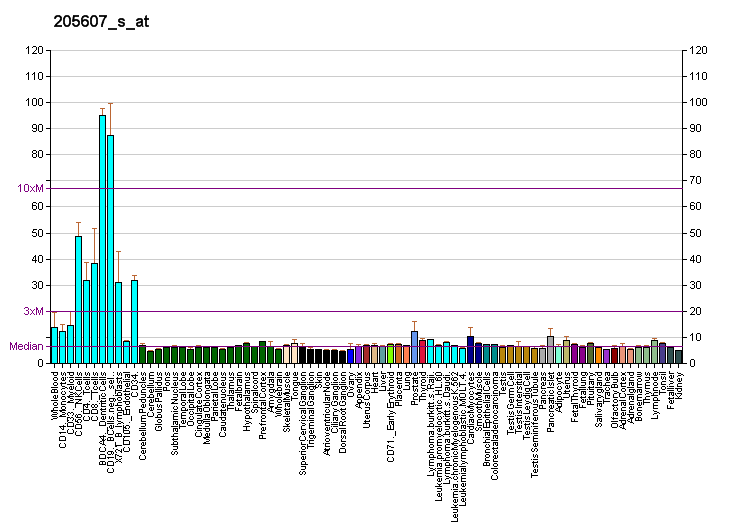
RNA expression pattern
Bgee	Human / Mouse (ortholog); Top expressed in: buccal mucosa cell; secondary oocyte; amniotic fluid; pancreatic ductal cell; epithelium of nasopharynx; palpebral conjunctiva; Epithelium of choroid plexus; Achilles tendon; endothelial cell; testicle / Top expressed in: superior cervical ganglion; spermatocyte; Paneth cell; granulocyte; otolith organ; facial motor nucleus; utricle; dorsal striatum; substantia nigra; mesenteric lymph nodes; More reference expression data
BioGPS	More reference expression data
Gene ontology
Molecular function	protein binding; ATP binding; kinase activity
Cellular component	cytoplasm; Golgi apparatus; cell projection; lamellipodium
Biological process	protein phosphorylation; cell migration
Sources:Amigo / QuickGO
Orthologs
Databases	NCBI: entry; OMA: entry
Species	Human	Mouse
Entrez	57147	240880
Ensembl	ENSG00000000457	ENSMUSG00000026584
UniProt	Q8IZE3	Q9DBQ7
RefSeq (mRNA)	NM_020423; NM_181093	NM_001286002; NM_001286003; NM_028776; NM_001357426
RefSeq (protein)	NP_065156; NP_851607	NP_001272931; NP_001272932; NP_083052; NP_001344355
Location (UCSC)	Chr 1: 169.85 – 169.89 Mb	Chr 1: 163.76 – 163.78 Mb
PubMed search
- Wikidata
View/Edit Human	View/Edit Mouse

Protein-associating with the carboxyl-terminal domain of ezrin is a protein that in humans is encoded by the SCYL3 gene.
