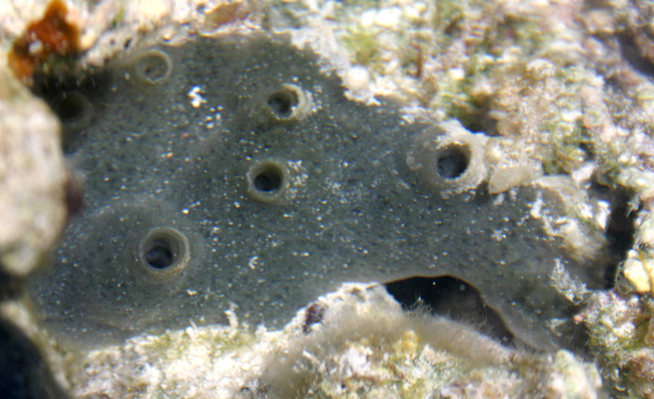

Scientific classification
- Kingdom: Animalia
- Phylum: Porifera
- Class: Demospongiae
- Order: Haplosclerida
- Family: Niphatidae
- Genus: Amphimedon
- Species: A. queenslandica

Binomial name
- Amphimedon queenslandica Hooper & Van Soest, 2006

= Amphimedon queenslandica =

Species of sponge

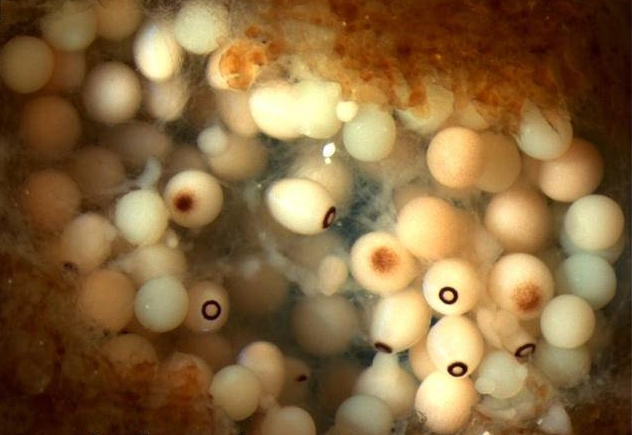
Amphimedon queenslandica stores embryos in its brood chamber. The image is about 4 mm wide.

Amphimedon queenslandica (formerly known as Reniera sp.) is a sponge native to the Great Barrier Reef. Its genome has been sequenced. It has been the subject of various studies on the evolution of metazoan development.

A. queenslandica was first discovered in 1998 on Heron Island Reef by Sally Leys when looking for sponges with larvae to study polarity, and was formally described by John Hooper and Rob van Soest in 2006. Like most sponges it has a biphasic life cycle, passing through a planktonic phase whilst a larva, but later becoming a benthic dweller. It is hermaphroditic, and reproduces via spermcast spawning, meaning it releases sperm into water but retains eggs, which are fertilised internally. The embryos develop in brood chambers until they reach a certain size, then disperse as parenchymella larvae. During this larval stage, they have a strong preference for darkness. The sponge is difficult or impossible to maintain in captivity.

== Genetics ==
The genome of Amphimedon queenslandica was sequenced in 2009 to provide insights into the evolution of animal complexity and was the first sponge to be sequenced. Subsequent research has also sequenced the genome of the freshwater sponge Ephydatia muelleri.
