= Jane Fromont =

New-Zealand-Australian scientist specialising in sponges

- Born: Phyllis Jane Fromont
- Education: James Cook University
- Scientific career
- Thesis: A taxonomic study of tropical marine sponges (Porifera: Demospongiae: Haplosclerida and Petrosida) using morphological, chemical and reproductive character sets) (1990)
- Author abbrev. (zoology): Fromont

Phyllis Jane Fromont is a New Zealand and Australian scientist specialising in sponges.

== Early life and education ==
Fromont was raised in Whanganui, New Zealand, the youngest of six children. She became interested in marine biology after scuba diving in Northland, and completed a Bachelor of Science degree that included some marine biology papers at the University of Auckland. She then undertook her overseas experience for about two years, before arriving in Perth, Western Australia, where she found work with an environmental consultancy firm and was a volunteer at the Western Australian Museum with curator of marine invertebrates, Loisette Marsh. After attending a workshop in Melbourne on sponges led by Patricia Bergquist and Felix Wiedenmayer, she was encouraged by Bergquist to return to Auckland for postgraduate study. She earned a Master of Science degree from the University of Auckland in 1985, with her thesis titled Poecilosclerida of New Zealand, and while there published papers with Bergquist. She followed this with a PhD (A taxonomic study of tropical marine sponges (Porifera: Demospongiae: Haplosclerida and Petrosida) using morphological, chemical and reproductive character sets) from James Cook University, completed in 1990, with her supervisor being Patricia Bergquist.

== Career ==
Following her PhD, Fromont worked for the Northern Territory Museum of Arts and Sciences, continuing to publish on sponges (Porifera). By 1994, she was affiliated not only with James Cook University, but also with the Queensland Museum, and continuing to publish work on the sponges of the Great Barrier Reef, and on chemical relationships helping to define the taxonomy of sponges. In 1996, she was awarded a three-year Australian Biological Resources Study scholarship and moved to the Aquatic Zoology department of the Western Australian Museum, also undertaking part-time curatorial work there. Three years later, she was appointed curator. As of 2021, she continues to work there.

Her zoological author abbreviation is Fromont.

== Taxa ==
A search on her name at WoRMS reveals (March 2022) she has authored over 100 sponge taxa.

Taxa named in her honour include the sponges, Anthotethya fromontae, Clathria fromontae, and Erylus fromontae, and the extinct Western Australian brachiopod, Cirpa fromontae.

== Publications ==
Fromont has authored over 90 scientific publications, including her most cited article, Assessing the complex sponge microbiota: core, variable and species-specific bacterial communities in marine sponges. In 2021, she, together with Loisette Marsh, received a commendation at the Whitley Awards, for their field guide, Field Guide to the Shallow Water Seastars of Australia.
