= B-1,3-galactosyl-O-glycosyl-glycoprotein b-1,6-N-acetylglucosaminyltransferase =

Class of enzymes

Beta-1,3-galactosyl-O-glycosyl-glycoprotein beta-1,6-N-acetylglucosaminyltransferase

Identifiers
- EC no.: 2.4.1.102
- CAS no.: 95978-15-7

Databases
- IntEnz: IntEnz view
- BRENDA: BRENDA entry
- ExPASy: NiceZyme view
- KEGG: KEGG entry
- MetaCyc: metabolic pathway
- PRIAM: profile
- PDB structures: RCSB PDB PDBe PDBsum
Search
- PMC: articles
- PubMed: articles
- NCBI: proteins

Beta-1,3-galactosyl-O-glycosyl-glycoprotein beta-1,6-N-acetylglucosaminyltransferase (EC 2.4.1.102, O-glycosyl-oligosaccharide-glycoprotein N-acetylglucosaminyltransferase I, beta6-N-acetylglucosaminyltransferase, uridine diphosphoacetylglucosamine-mucin beta-(1->6)-acetylglucosaminyltransferase, core 2 acetylglucosaminyltransferase, core 6-beta-GlcNAc-transferase A, UDP-N-acetyl-D-glucosamine:O-glycosyl-glycoprotein (N-acetyl-D-glucosamine to N-acetyl-D-galactosamine of beta-D-galactosyl-1,3-N-acetyl-D-galactosaminyl-R) beta-1,6-N-acetyl-D-glucosaminyltransferase) is an enzyme with systematic name UDP-N-acetyl-D-glucosamine:O-glycosyl-glycoprotein (N-acetyl-D-glucosamine to N-acetyl-D-galactosamine of beta-D-galactosyl-(1->3)-N-acetyl-D-galactosaminyl-R) 6-beta-N-acetyl-D-glucosaminyltransferase. This enzyme catalyses the following chemical reaction

UDP-N-acetyl-D-glucosamine + beta-D-galactosyl-(1->3)-N-acetyl-D-galactosaminyl-R $\rightleftharpoons$ UDP + beta-D-galactosyl-(1->3)-[N-acetyl-beta-D-glucosaminyl-(1->6)]-N-acetyl-D-galactosaminyl-R
