= Stuart Oliver Ridley =

English cleric and zoologist

Stuart Oliver Ridley (1853–1935) was an English cleric and zoologist.

== Early life ==
He was born in 1853, the son of the Rev. Oliver Matthew Ridley and his first wife Laura Pole Stuart (died 1858), daughter of Sir William Stuart; Henry Nicholas Ridley was a younger brother. For the first years of his life his father was rector of West Harling in Norfolk, moving to Cobham, Kent in 1860. He was educated at Haileybury College.

Ridley matriculated at Magdalen College, Oxford in 1872. He moved in 1873 to Exeter College, where he graduated B.A. in 1875 (1st class in Natural Sciences), M.A. in 1881. He also studied under Ernst Haeckel. He taught at Friars School, Bangor, and worked in 1878 at the British Museum as an assistant.

== Clerical career ==
In 1887 Ridley was ordained deacon, and in 1888 priest at Carlisle. He was a curate at Maryport 1887 to 1890, then at Wareham, Dorset 1891 to 1895. He was curate at Milborne Port in Somerset 1895 to 1897, where he gave a magic lantern talk on the voyage of HMS Challenger; and was vicar of Staverton, Wiltshire from 1897 to 1905. At Milborne Port and Staverton, his parish work was supported by his sister Miss Ridley. He had two sisters, of his father's first marriage, one of whom was a deaconess of the Church of England. Miss Ridley, described as "sister of the well-known Singapore botanist" (i.e. Henry Nicholas Ridley), was a botanist, and resided for a time in the Peppard ward of Reading, Berkshire, where she was in 1910.

Ridley became vicar of Scarisbrick, where he was from 1905 to 1911, succeeding his brother Charles William Ridley (1856–1905); and of Compton Bishop, near Axbridge in Somerset, where he was from 1911 to 1916.

Ridley in 1917 was curate of St John's Church, Reading, where he was in 1929.

== Later life ==
In later life Ridley was a naturalist, and he was a herbarium curator at Reading Museum. He joined the Botanical Society of the British Isles in 1929. He died in 1935.

== Works ==
In 1881 Ridley published a zoological paper on the expedition of HMS Alert off the coast of South America. In 1883 his paper was one of a number arising from Francis Day's collection on the 1882 survey cruise of HMS Triton off Scotland. He published on the genus Lophopus of bryozoa in 1886. Also in 1886, he published a paper in The Zoologist with his brother Henry Nicholas Ridley, Animal Life in High Latitudes on the Norway Coast.

Ridley worked on the report of the Challenger expedition. He was succeeded in his position in the Zoological Department of the British Museum in 1887 by Arthur Dendy. They published joint papers on the expedition's sponge specimens, and then Dendy and Ridley wrote for the Challenger report Part LIX (Volume XX.), Report on the Monaxonida (1887). The Biographical Etymology of Marine Organism Names (BEMON) lists under Dendy's name 14 species named for Ridley.

Ridley's main duties at the British Museum were in the area of sponges. He was an early contact there of Leopold and Rudolf Blaschka, the makers of glass models. After his departure, the correspondence was taken up by Albert Günther.
