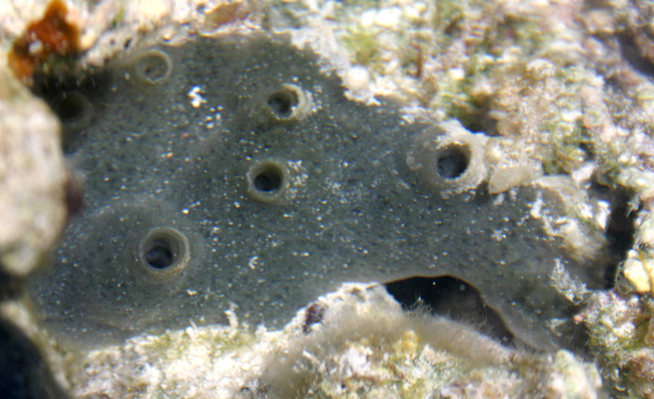
- Amphimedon queenslandica adult

Scientific classification
- Domain: Eukaryota
- Kingdom: Animalia
- Phylum: Porifera
- Class: Demospongiae
- Order: Haplosclerida
- Family: Niphatidae; Van Soest, 1980

Genera
- See text

= Niphatidae =

Family of sponges

Niphatidae is a family of demosponges in the order Haplosclerida, first described in 1980 by Rob van Soest. It contains the following genera:

- Amphimedon Duchassaing & Michelotti, 1864
- Cribrochalina Schmidt, 1870
- Dasychalina Ridley & Dendy, 1886
- Gelliodes Ridley, 1884
- Haliclonissa Burton, 1932
- Hemigellius Burton, 1932
- Microxina Topsent, 1916
- Niphates Duchassaing & Michelotti, 1864
- Pachychalina Schmidt, 1868
