= Bay of Pigs =

Bay on the island of Cuba

- Bahía de Cochinos (Spanish)
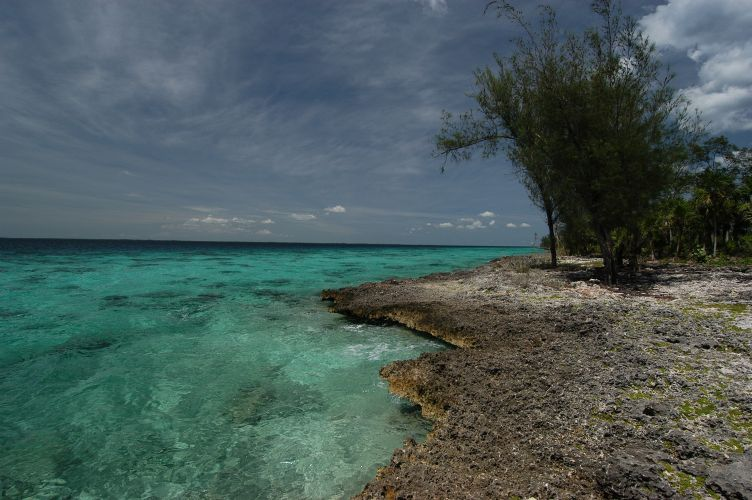
- Bay of Pigs from Cueva de los Peces

- Location of Bay of Pigs in Cuba

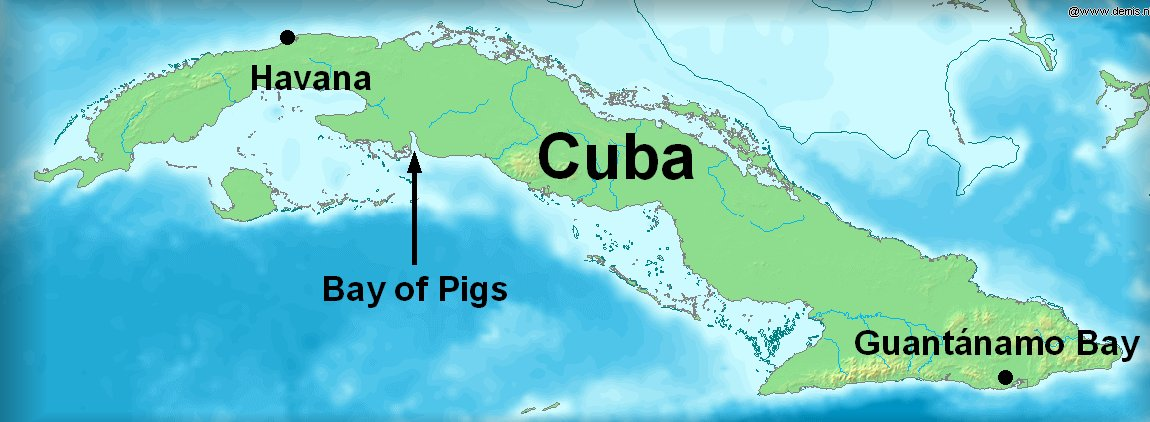
- Location of Bay of Pigs in Cuba
- Location: Matanzas, Cuba
- Coordinates: 22°13′N 81°10′W
- Type: Bay
- Etymology: Cochino meaning both "pig" and "triggerfish"
- Part of: Gulf of Cazones
- Ocean/sea sources: Caribbean Sea
- Max. length: max. 27 km (17 mi)
- Max. width: max. 10 km (6.2 mi)
- Surface area: 200 km^{2} (77 sq mi)
- Shore length^{1}: 87 km (54 mi)
- Max. temperature: 29 °C (84 °F)
- Min. temperature: 22 °C (72 °F)
- Frozen: Never
- Islands: Cayo Piedra
- Settlements: Playa Girón, Playa Larga
- ^{1} Shore length is not a well-defined measure.

The Bay of Pigs (Spanish: Bahía de Cochinos) is an inlet of the Gulf of Cazones, located on the southern coast of Cuba. By 1910, it was included in Santa Clara Province and then Las Villas Province by 1961, but in 1976, it was reassigned to Matanzas Province, when the original six provinces of Cuba were re-organized into 14 new Provinces of Cuba.

The area is a site known for its diving, with an abundance of marine fauna, e.g., 30 species of sponges belonging to 19 families and 21 genera, to be found in the bay.

The bay is historically known for being the site of the failed Bay of Pigs Invasion of 1961.

== Etymology ==
In Cuban Spanish, cochinos may also mean the queen triggerfish (Balistes vetula), which inhabit coral reefs in Bahía de Cochinos, in addition to the literal meaning, pigs (Sus scrofa).

== Geography ==
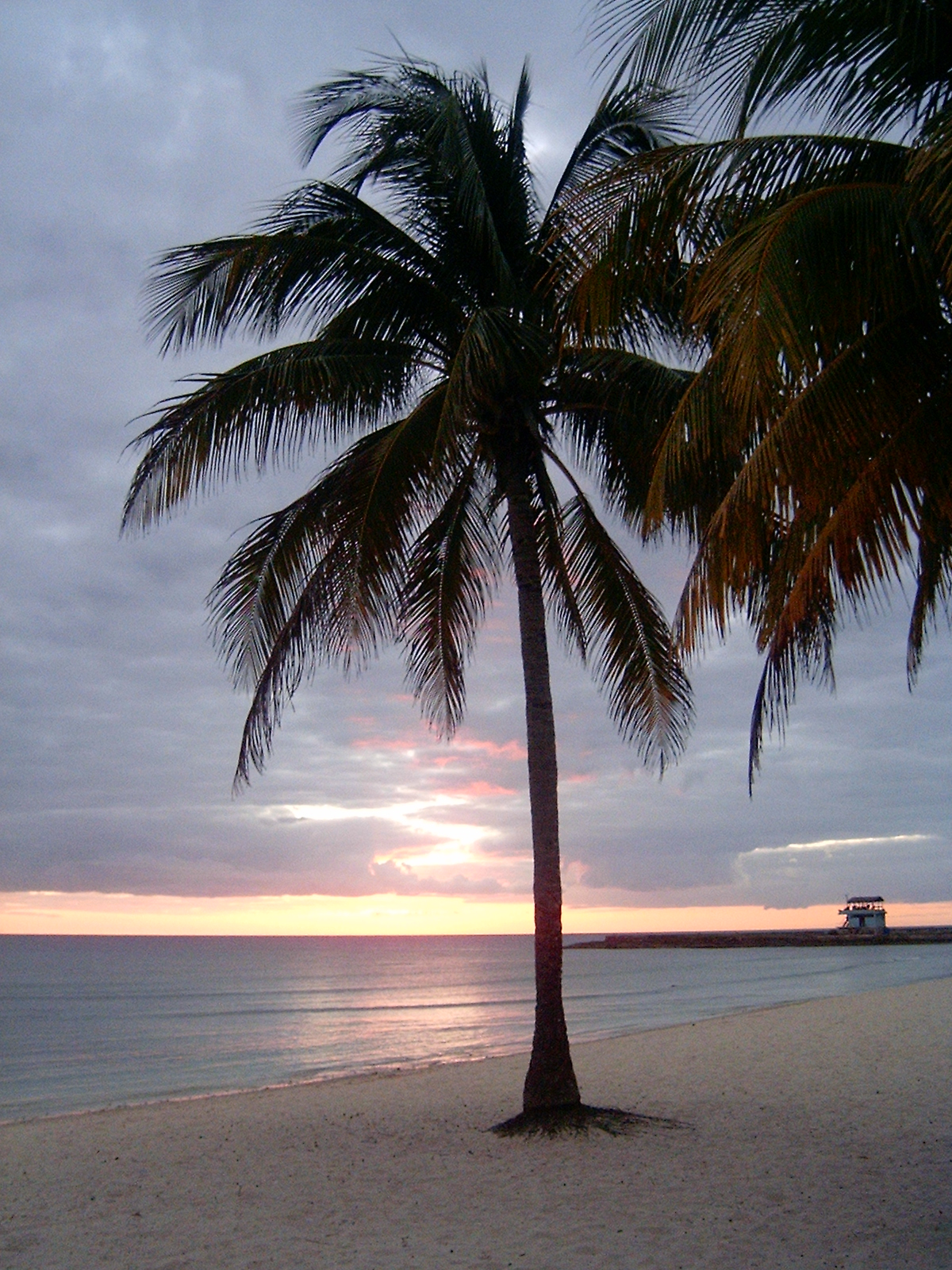
Sunset in Playa Girón in October 2007

This bay is approximately 30 kilometres (19 mi) south of Jagüey Grande, 70 kilometres (43 mi) west of the city of Cienfuegos, and 150 kilometres (93 mi) southeast from the capital city Havana. On the western side of the bay, coral reefs border the main Zapata Swamp, part of the Zapata Peninsula. On the eastern side, beaches border margins of firm ground with mangroves and extensive areas of swampland to the north and east. At the north end of the bay, the village of Buena Ventura is adjacent to Playa Larga (Long Beach). 35 kilometres (22 mi) southeast of that, Playa Girón (Giron Beach) at the village of Girón, named after the notorious French pirate Gilberto Giron (c. 1604).

== History ==
Playa Girón and Playa Larga were the landing sites for seaborne forces of armed Cuban exiles and the land strip for some American planes (but not many as America did not want Cuba to realize that it was American sponsored) in the Bay of Pigs Invasion, an American CIA-sponsored attempt to overthrow the new government of Cuban Prime Minister Fidel Castro in April 1961.

According to Fidel Castro's former bodyguard, the late Juan Reinaldo Sánchez, Castro lived in great luxury and had a private island called Cayo Piedra in the Bay of Pigs, replete with "mansions, guest houses, a heliport, dolphinarium, turtle lagoon, his luxury yacht Aquarama – a gift from Leonid Brezhnev – and deep-sea fishing speedboat".

== Diving ==
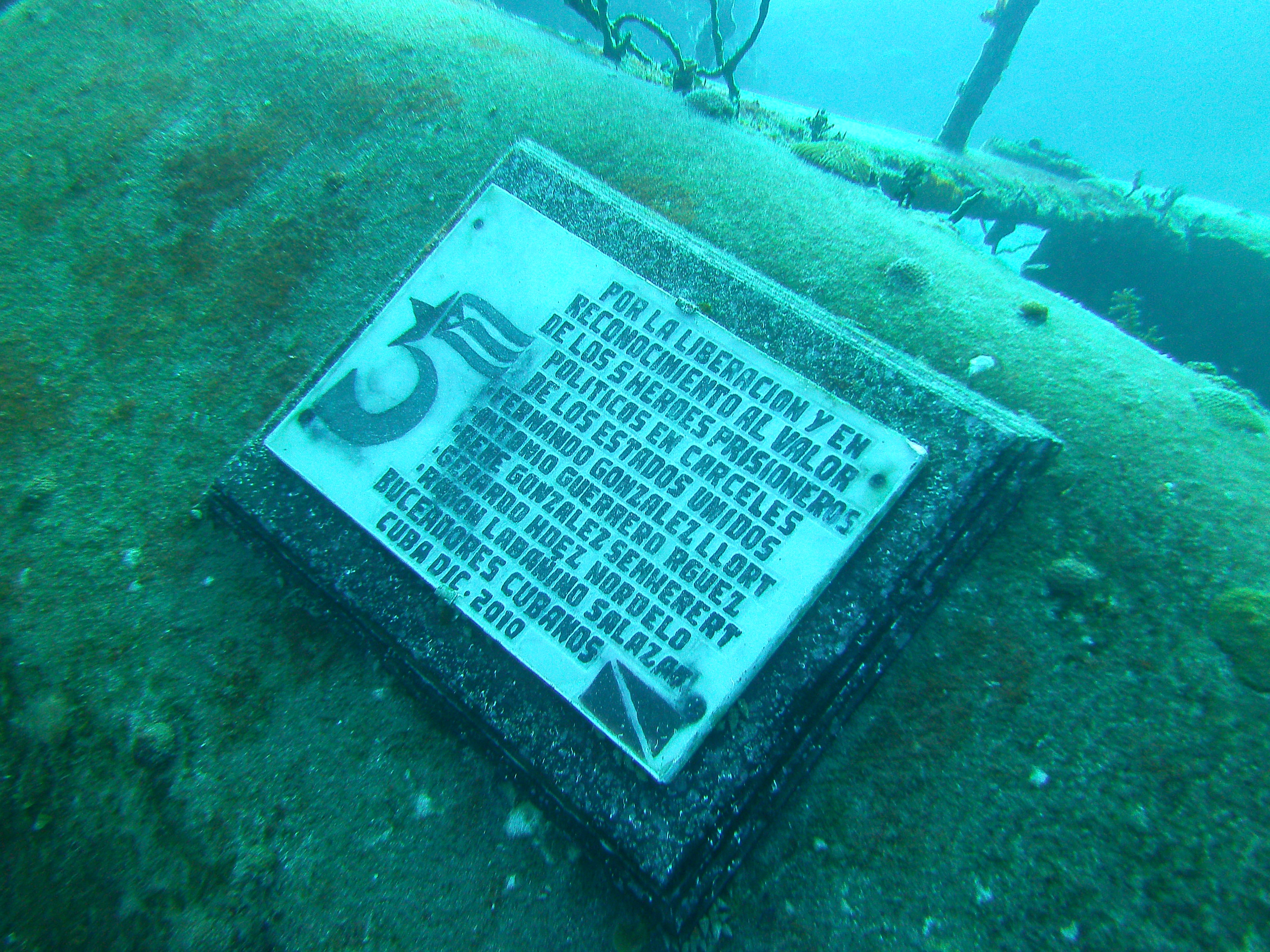
Monument honoring five Cuban political prisoners held captive in the United States

The Bay of Pigs is a relatively quiet site for diving. Dive centers exist in Playa Larga, Playa Girón and Caleta Buena. Twelve dive sites in the bay display excellent visibility of 20 to 40 metres (66 to 131 ft), an average water temperature of 22 °C (72 °F) in December and 29 °C (84 °F) in July. Walls of coral, caverns, and a variety of fish (including the barracuda, lionfish, and groupers, among others), coral, and sponges can be found in the Bay of Pigs.

The Caves of the Fishes (Spanish: Cueva de los Peces), with 72 metres (236 ft) depth the deepest cenote of Cuba, is located at 18 kilometres (11 mi) south of Playa Larga.

=== Biodiversity ===
Surrounding the Bay of Pigs, the endemic wormlizards Amphisbaena barbouri and A. cubana have been noted. The following marine species have been registered along the eastern coast of the Bay of Pigs:

Group	Common name	Scientific name	Image	Notes
Fish	blue chromis	Chromis cyanea		
Fish	blue tang	Acanthurus coeruleus		
Fish	bluehead wrasse	Thalassoma bifasciatum		
Fish	striped parrotfish	Scarus iseri		
Fish	beau gregory	Stegastes leucostictus		
Fish	bicolor damselfish	Stegastes partitus		
Fish	boga	Inermia vittata		
Fish	Colon goby	Coryphopterus dicrus		
Fish	creole wrasse	Clepticus parrae		
Fish	longfin damselfish	Stegastes diencaeus		
Fish	masked goby	Coryphopterus personatus		
Fish	threespot damselfish	Stegastes planifrons		
Fish	yellowhead wrasse	Halichoeres garnoti		
Fish	French grunt	Haemulon flavolineatum		
Fish	ocean surgeon	Acanthurus bahianus		
Fish	sergeant major	Abudefduf saxatilis		
Fish	slippery dick	Halichoeres bivittatus		
Fish	yellowtail snapper	Ocyurus chrysurus		
Fish	bar jack	Caranx ruber		
Fish	barred hamlet	Hypoplectrus puella		
Fish	brown chromis	Chromis multilineata		
Fish	foureye butterflyfish	Chaetodon capistratus		
Fish	graysby	Epinephelus cruentatus		
Fish	longjaw squirrelfish	Holocentrus marianus		
Fish	redband parrotfish	Sparisoma aurofrenatum		
Fish	royal gramma	Gramma loreto		
Fish	stoplight parrotfish	Sparisoma viride		
Fish	tomtate grunt	Haemulon aurolineatum		
Fish	white grunt	Haemulon plumierii		
Fish	porgies	Calamus sp.		
Fish	banded butterflyfish	Chaetodon striatus		
Fish	buffalo trunkfish	Lactophrys trigonus		
Fish	flat needlefish	Ablennes hians		
Fish	glasseye	Heteropriacanthus cruentatus		
Fish	longspine squirrelfish	Holocentrus rufus		
Fish	plate fish	Bothus lunatus		
Fish	red lionfish (invasive)	Pterois volitans		
Fish	spotfin butterflyfish	Chaetodon ocellatus		
Fish	trumpetfish	Aulostomus maculatus		
Sponges	azure vase sponge	Callyspongia plicifera		
Sponges	yellow tube sponge	Aplysina fistularis		
Sponges	green finger sponge	Iotrochota birotulata		
Sponges	orange icing sponge	Mycale laevis		
Sponges	pink vase sponge	Niphates digitalis		
Sponges	row pore rope sponge	Aplysina cauliformis		
Sponges	touch-me-not sponge	Neofibularia nolitangere		
Sponges	demosponges	Cliona sp.		
Sponges		Cliona aprica		
Sponges		Cliona delitrix		
Sponges		Cliona varians		
Sponges		Aiolochroia crassa		
Sponges		Ectyoplasia ferox		
Sponges		Ircinia felix		
Sponges		Mycale laxissima		
Sponges		Plakortis angulospiculatus		
Sponges		Scopalina ruetzleri		
Sponges		Smenospongia aurea		
Sponges		Spirastrella coccinea		
Corals	boulder brain coral	Colpophyllia natans		
Corals	Caribbean sea whip	Plexaura homomalla		
Corals	elkhorn coral	Acropora palmata		
Corals	great star coral	Montastraea cavernosa		
Corals	maze coral	Meandrina meandrites		
Corals	purple sea fan	Gorgonia ventalina		
Corals	sea ginger	Millepora alcicornis		
Crustaceans	Caribbean spiny lobster	Panulirus argus		
Echinoderms	donkey dung sea cucumber	Holothuria mexicana		
Mollusks	queen conch	Lobatus gigas		

== See also ==
- Geography of Cuba

== Bibliography ==
- Caballero, Hansel; Busutil, Linnet; García, Yanel; Alcolado, Pedro M. (2009). "Variación espacial en comunidades de esponjas de la costa oriental de Bahía de Cochinos, Cuba". Rev. Invest. Cost. I: 95–109. Bibcode:2009RCMC....1...95C. doi:10.15359/revmar.1.5. hdl:1834/3523. ISSN 1659-407X.
- Chevalier, Pedro P.; Cárdenas, Antonio L. (2005). "Variación espacial y temporal de las asociaciones de peces en arrecifes costeros de la costa oriental de la Bahía de Cochinos – II: Análisis multidimensional". Rev. Invest. Mar. 26: 59–66.
- Rodríguez Cruz, Juan Carlos (1999). Bay of Pigs and the CIA. Ocean Press, Melbourne. pp. 1–212. ISBN 978-1-875284-98-6.
- Rodríguez Schettino, Lourdes; Mancina, Carlos A.; Rivalta González, Vilma (2013). "Reptiles of Cuba: Checklist and Geographic Distributions" (PDF). Smithsonian Herpetological Information Service. 144: 1–96. hdl:10088/22148.
