= Ernst Thälmann Island =

Small island off the coast of Cuba

- Location within Cuba

Geography
- Location: Gulf of Cazones
- Coordinates: 22°01′36″N 81°22′37″W
- Area: 7.0 km^{2} (2.7 sq mi)

Administration
- Cuba
- Province: Matanzas Province

Demographics
- Population: 12 (researchers) (2025)

Ernst Thälmann Island or Ernst Thälmann Cay (Spanish: Cayo Ernesto Thaelmann or Cayo Blanco del Sur; German: Ernst-Thälmann-Insel or Südliche weiße Insel) is a 15 km (9.3 mi) long and 500 m (1,600 ft) wide island in the Gulf of Cazones. In the 1970s, Cuba promised to donate an island in its archipelago to East Germany, and subsequently renamed what was then known as Cayo Blanco del Sur after German communist Ernst Thälmann. Because the island was not mentioned in later documents incorporating East Germany into reunified Germany, various parties have argued that it remains a territory of the former nation, but Cuba has rejected this argument and claims jurisdiction over it.

== History ==
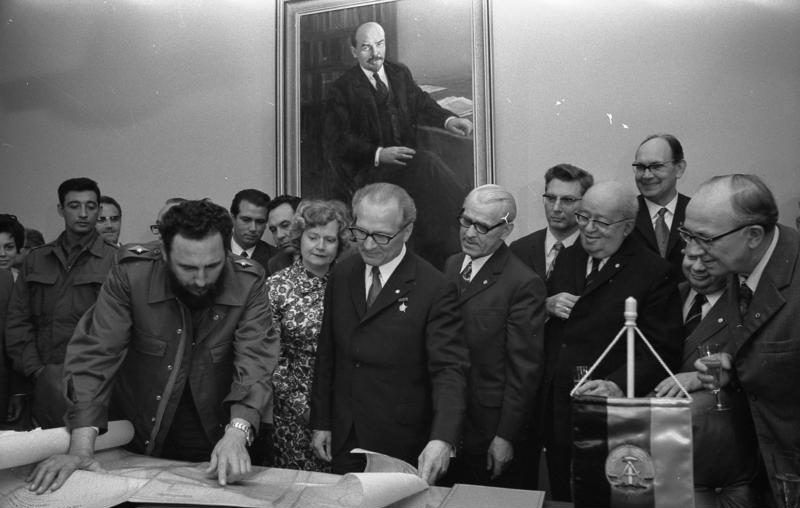
East Berlin, 19 June 1972: Fidel Castro (left) handed over, after the signing of the communiqué, a Cuban map to Erich Honecker (centre). The map shows an island that bears the name "Ernst Thälmann", with the southern area named "GDR Beach" (Playa RDA, DDR-Strand).

During a 1970s state visit to East Germany, Cuban prime minister Fidel Castro promised that his country would donate an island to its communist ally. As part of a state visit in June 1972 by East German general secretary Erich Honecker, Castro renamed Cayo Blanco del Sur (English: Southern White Key) in honour of German communist politician and activist Ernst Thälmann. According to an article in Neues Deutschland, he also announced that one of its beaches had been renamed to Playa República Democrática Alemana (English: German Democratic Republic Beach, German: DDR-Strand). East Germany's state television newscast Aktuelle Kamera reported on the ceremony and the unveiling of a bust of Thälmann in August 1972 in the presence of the East German ambassador, East German delegates, and Cuban representatives. In March 1975, the East German government sent singer Frank Schöbel to Cuba to make music videos. Film footage of the island was also shot, which was later included in a documentary emphasizing the island as a symbol of East German–Cuban friendship.

In 1990, the end of the Cold War led to the dissolution of the East German government, with its territory added to the federal republic of West Germany, incorporating as unified Germany. However, the reunification treaty made no reference to Ernst Thälmann Island as one of the territories joining the combined nation, leading to arguments about its status. Neither of the German states controlled the island during or after the reunification.

In 1998, the island was severely hit by Hurricane Mitch, knocking over the bust of Thälmann. A German online newspaper sought to visit the island in 2001, on the premise that it was German territory, but they were rebuffed. According to the Cuban embassy in Germany the renaming had been a "symbolic act", and the German Foreign Office concurred that it was "not a gift, but a change of name", and the island was never actually transferred from Cuba.

== See also ==
- Canarreos Archipelago, near the island
- Cuba–Germany relations
- Republic of Molossia, unrecognised micronation claiming to be at war with East Germany
