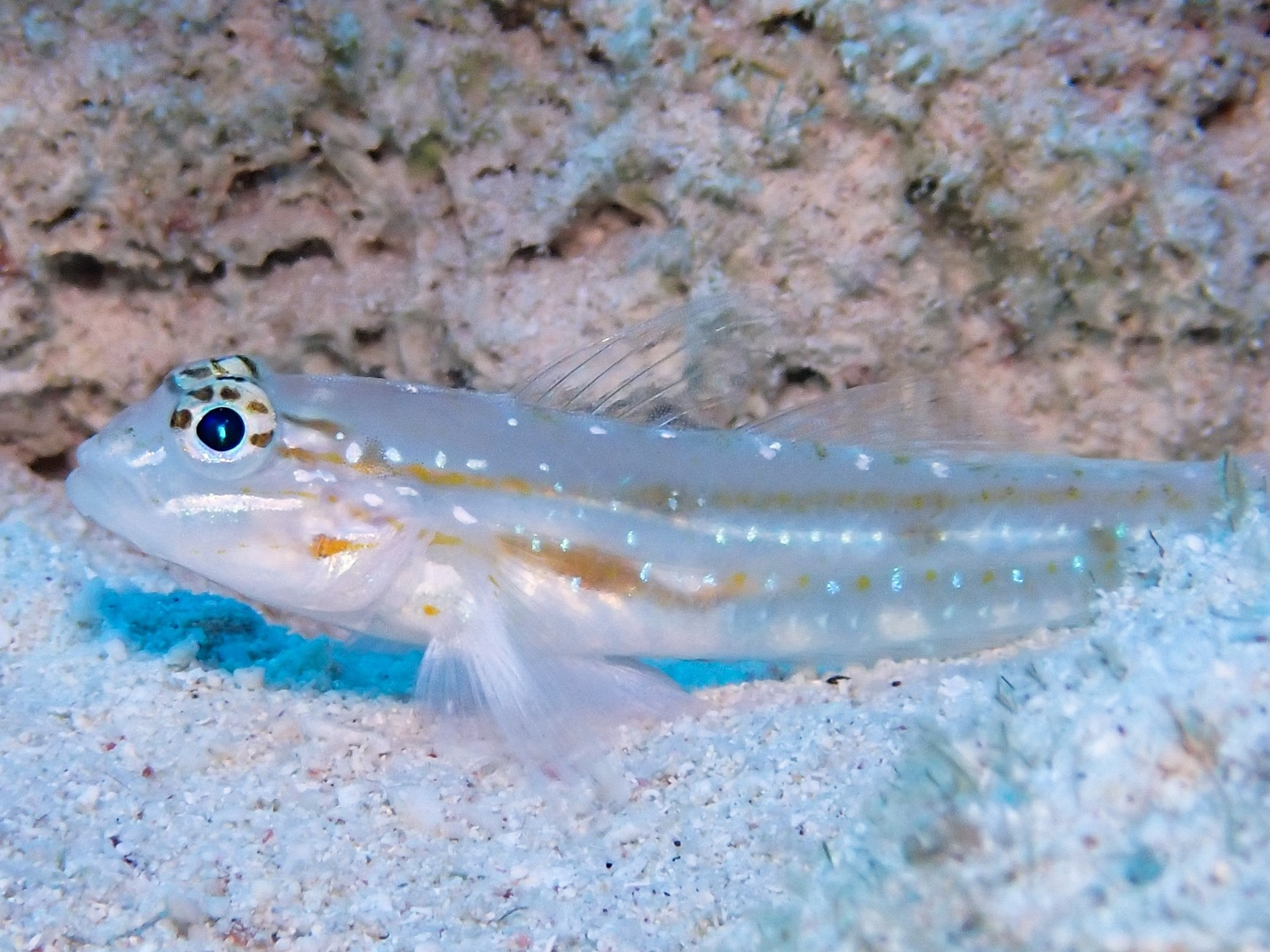

Conservation status
- Vulnerable (IUCN 3.1)

Scientific classification
- Kingdom: Animalia
- Phylum: Chordata
- Class: Actinopterygii
- Order: Gobiiformes
- Family: Gobiidae
- Genus: Coryphopterus
- Species: C. venezuelae

Binomial name
- Coryphopterus venezuelae Cervigón, 1966

= Coryphopterus venezuelae =

Species of fish

Coryphopterus venezuelae is a species of goby found in the western Atlantic Ocean from Belize to Panama, the north coast of South America, Curaçao, Venezuela. It is also found in the Bahamas, the U.S. Virgin Islands, Puerto Rico, Saba, and Brazil.

== Description ==
This species reaches a length of 7.5 cm (3.0 in).
