= Cuba–Germany relations =

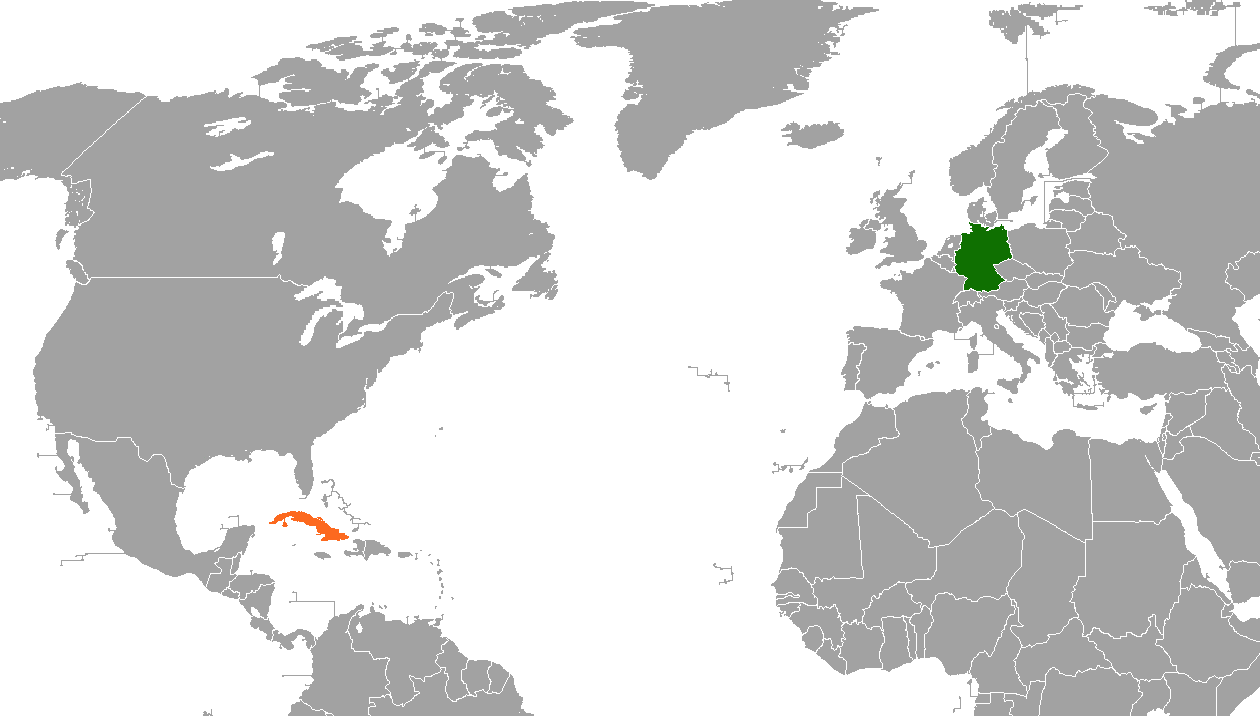

- Germany: Cuba

Germany and the Republic of Cuba share diplomatic relations. Cuba has an embassy in Berlin and Germany has an embassy in Havana.

== History ==
After Castro's Cuba was formed, it established formal relations with East Germany, another communist state while having no formal relations with West Germany.

In 1972, General Secretary Erich Honecker visited Cuba and in honor of the state visit, Fidel Castro renamed an island to Ernst Thälmann Island in honor of Ernst Thälmann, the leader of the Communist Party of Germany from 1925 to 1933. Fidel Castro made a promise to hand over the island to the East German Government although it was later considered a "symbolic" transfer of land rather than a literal transfer. A bust was unveiled of Ernst Thälmann and was filmed by Aktuelle Kamera. In 1975, Frank Schöbel was sent to the island to make music videos and later a documentary was filmed partially on the island to emphasize GDR-Cuban relations.

Cuba later established formal relations with Germany and by 2000, Heidemarie Wieczorek-Zeul, German minister of development, visited Cuba. Embassies were established in both countries shortly after. In 2001, economic minister Werner Müller visited Cuba to meet with Fidel Castro to discuss trade relations. In 2015, foreign minister Frank-Walter Steinmeier visited Cuba, marking the first time a German foreign minister visited Cuba in 113 years. As of 2015, over 40 German companies had operations in Cuba.

Germany has an Academic exchange service with Cuba to promote educational ties between both nations.

== Trade ==
Germany opened up a "German Office to promote trade and investment" in Cuba in 2018. Cuba cooperates with Germany on several development aid projects involving environmental protections, renewable energy, and combating climate change. Several academic.

In 2019, Cuba exported US$64.7 million worth of goods to Germany, with the largest export being rolled tobacco with over 118 million tons being exported. Germany in the same year exported US$212 million worth of goods to Cuba. Germany exports a wide variety of mechanical and industrial devices such as centrifuges and agricultural products such as wheat.

In 2020, Cuban Vice Minister of Foreign Trade and Investment Ana Teresita Gonzalez, and German ambassador to Cuba discussed ways to progress economic and trade relations. A joint German-Cuban venture, PAMAS, was created to build industrial valves, pneumatic and hydraulic components.

== See also ==
- Foreign relations of Cuba
- Foreign relations of Germany
