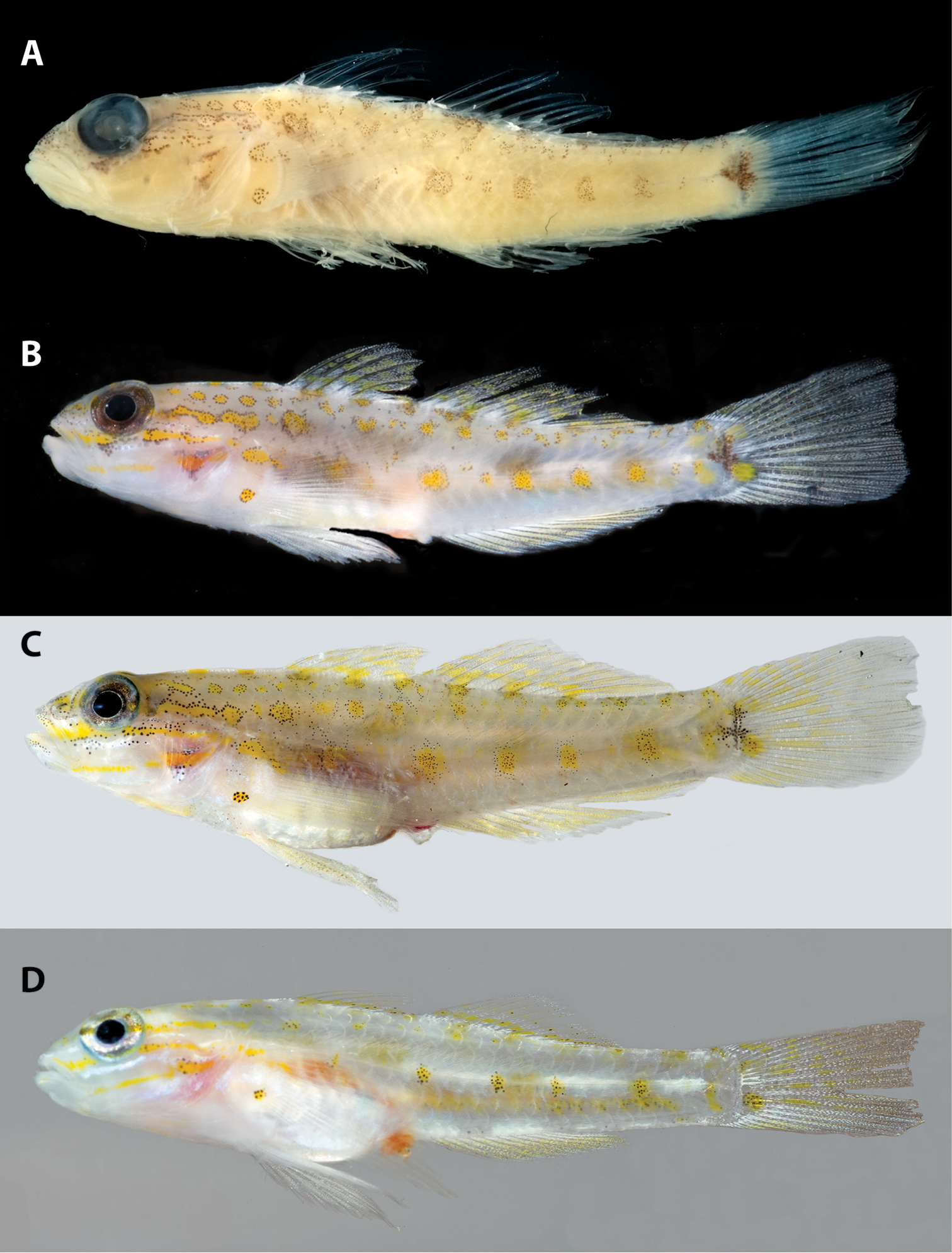

Conservation status
- Data Deficient (IUCN 3.1)

Scientific classification
- Kingdom: Animalia
- Phylum: Chordata
- Class: Actinopterygii
- Order: Gobiiformes
- Family: Gobiidae
- Genus: Coryphopterus
- Species: C. curasub

Binomial name
- Coryphopterus curasub C. C. Baldwin & D. R. Robertson, 2015

= Coryphopterus curasub =

Species of fish

Coryphopterus curasub, the yellow-spotted sand goby, is a species of goby found in the eastern-central Pacific Ocean.
