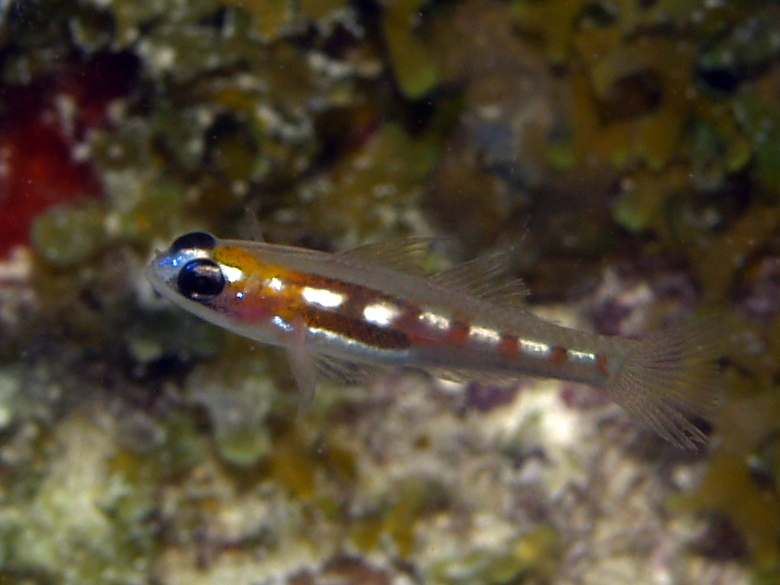

Conservation status
- Vulnerable (IUCN 3.1)

Scientific classification
- Kingdom: Animalia
- Phylum: Chordata
- Class: Actinopterygii
- Order: Gobiiformes
- Family: Gobiidae
- Genus: Coryphopterus
- Species: C. personatus

Binomial name
- Coryphopterus personatus (D. S. Jordan & J. C. Thompson, 1905)

Synonyms
- Eviota personata Jordan & Thompson, 1905

= Coryphopterus personatus =

Species of fish

Coryphopterus personatus, commonly referred to as the masked goby, is a marine species of goby found in the western-central Atlantic Ocean.

C. personatus is a cryptobenthic species, living in caves and shaded areas near the sea floor in reef communities. Masked gobies are sequential hermaphrodites and are capable of changing sexes.

== Description ==
This species reaches a maximum length of 4.0 cm (1.6 in). This species is difficult to differentiate from the closely related C. hyalinus. C. personatus has a dark "mask" on its face, a faint dusky stripe on the lower rear margin of the body, and a translucent patch on the center of the top of its head. C. personatus is also slightly larger than C. hyalinus, which only reaches 3 cm (1.2 in).
