= Gulf of Cazones =

Gulf in Cuba

Coordinates: 21°55′49″N 81°17′15″W

Location of Gulf of Cazones in Cuba

Gulf of Cazones (Spanish: Golfo de Cazones) is a large gulf in southern Cuba. It is located at the south by the provinces of Matanzas and Cienfuegos, between the northeast edge of the Jardinillos Bank on the south, and Piedras and other cays and reefs on the north. It is considered dangerous for sailing vessels to traverse because of calms and cross currents.

== Geography ==
Two miles east-northeast of the south point of Diego Perez Cay is the beginning of the northeast section of the Jardinillos (or Jardines) bank which continues to the southeast of East Rock. East Rock is situated approximately a cable from the northeast end of East Guano Cay, to which it is connected by a reef. This northern edge of the bank rises like a wall with one or two sandy patches on it above water. With Pedras Cays and the reefs on the north, it forms the Gulf of Cazones. A submerged platform, between 3 and 4 fathoms (5.5 to 7.3 metres) deep, exists between the Bay of Pigs, the Gulf of Cazones, the Gulf of Batabano, and the Isle of Pines. It is also inferred that the Gulf of Cazones may have been created due to a geological fault.

== History ==
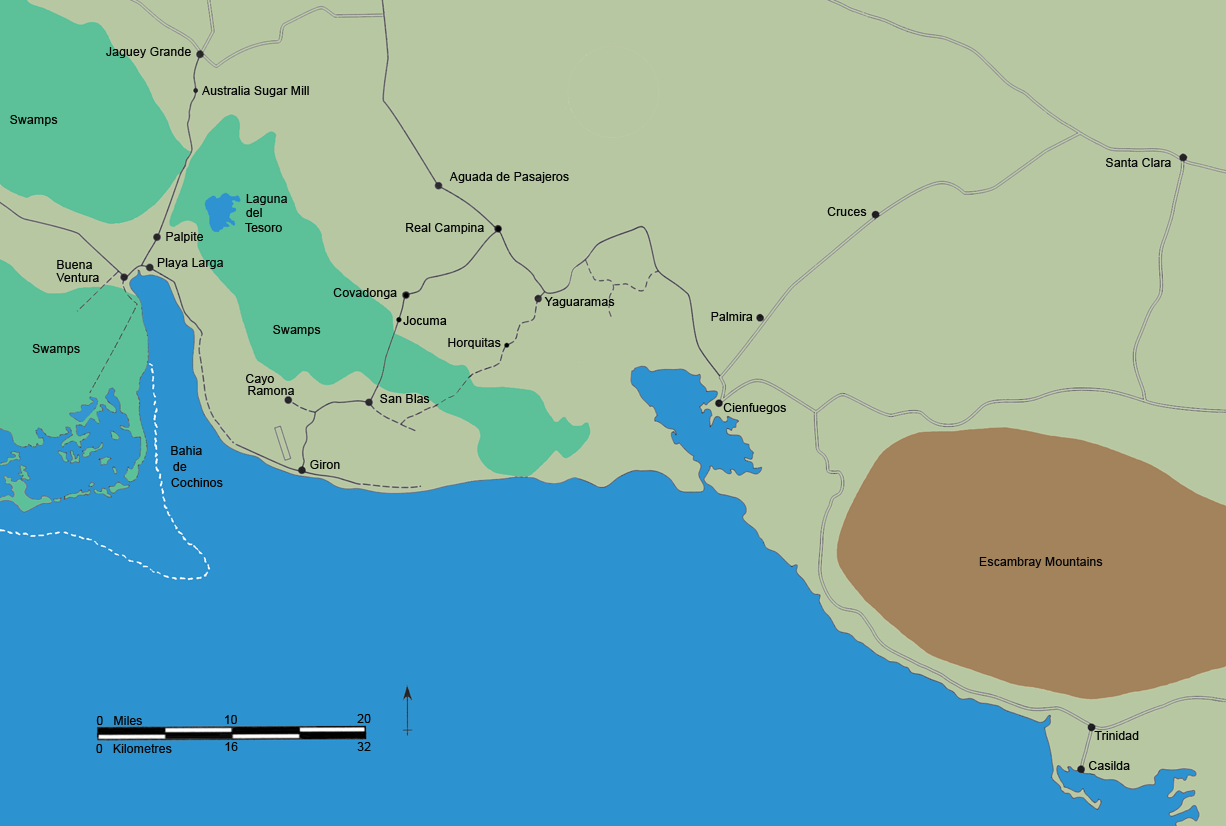
Bahia de Cochinos (1961)

The Bay of Pigs (Spanish: Bahia de Cochinos), a small undistinguished bay on the Gulf of Cazones, was the location of the 1961 Bay of Pigs Invasion, a failed attempt by a group of Cuban counter-revolutionaries, funded and trained by the United States, to overthrow Fidel Castro's leftist government.

== Marine life ==
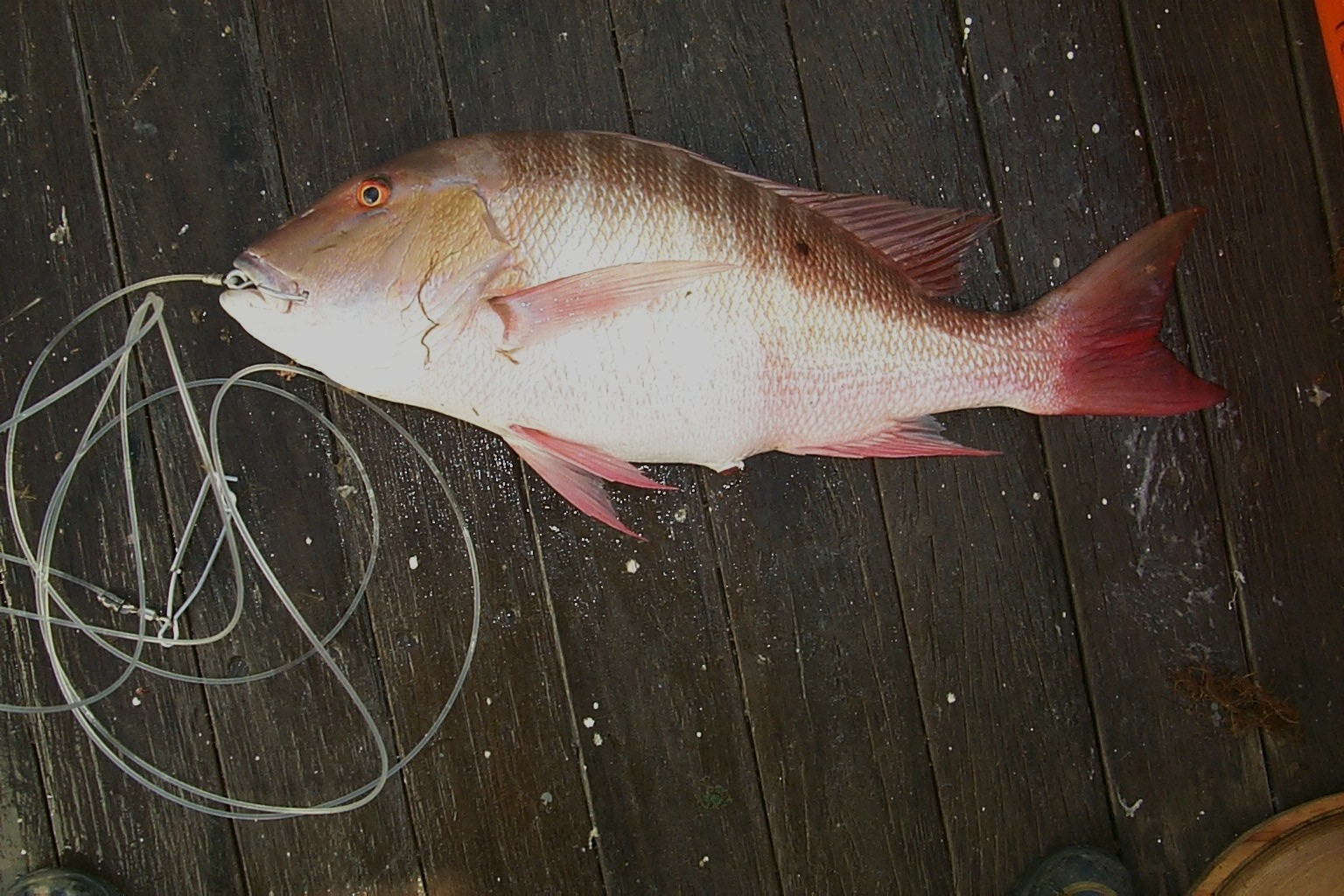
Lane snapper.

On the western border of the Gulf of Cazones, a stretch of 48 kilometres (30 mi) forms the head of Cayo Sigua and Cayo Blanco. In this stretch, with vertical cliffs, there are diving locations where the depth of the sea varies from 15 m to 200m. At these diving locations, coral fish and large tubular sponges, sea fans and coral colonies are reported. Lane snappers (Lutjanus analis) spawn at the edge of the gulf.

Black coral has been depleted in the shallower waters of the gulf as its use for ornamental jewellery has increased since the 1960s, although there are now regulations forbidding the collection of specimens less than 1.2 metres (3.9 ft) tall and 2.5 centimetres (0.98 in) wide.
