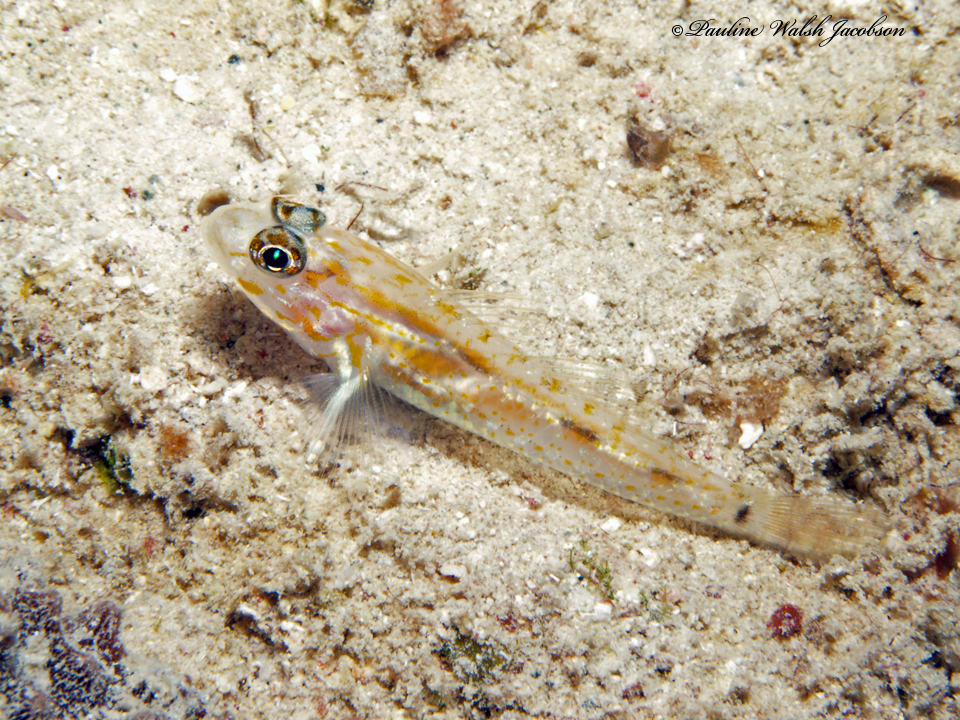

Conservation status
- Vulnerable (IUCN 3.1)

Scientific classification
- Kingdom: Animalia
- Phylum: Chordata
- Class: Actinopterygii
- Order: Gobiiformes
- Family: Gobiidae
- Genus: Coryphopterus
- Species: C. eidolon

Binomial name
- Coryphopterus eidolon J. E. Böhlke & C. R. Robins, 1960

= Coryphopterus eidolon =

Species of fish

Coryphopterus eidolon, the pallid goby, is a species of goby found in the western Atlantic Ocean from southern Florida and the Bahamas to Brazil.

== Description ==
This species reaches a length of 6.0 cm (2.4 in).
