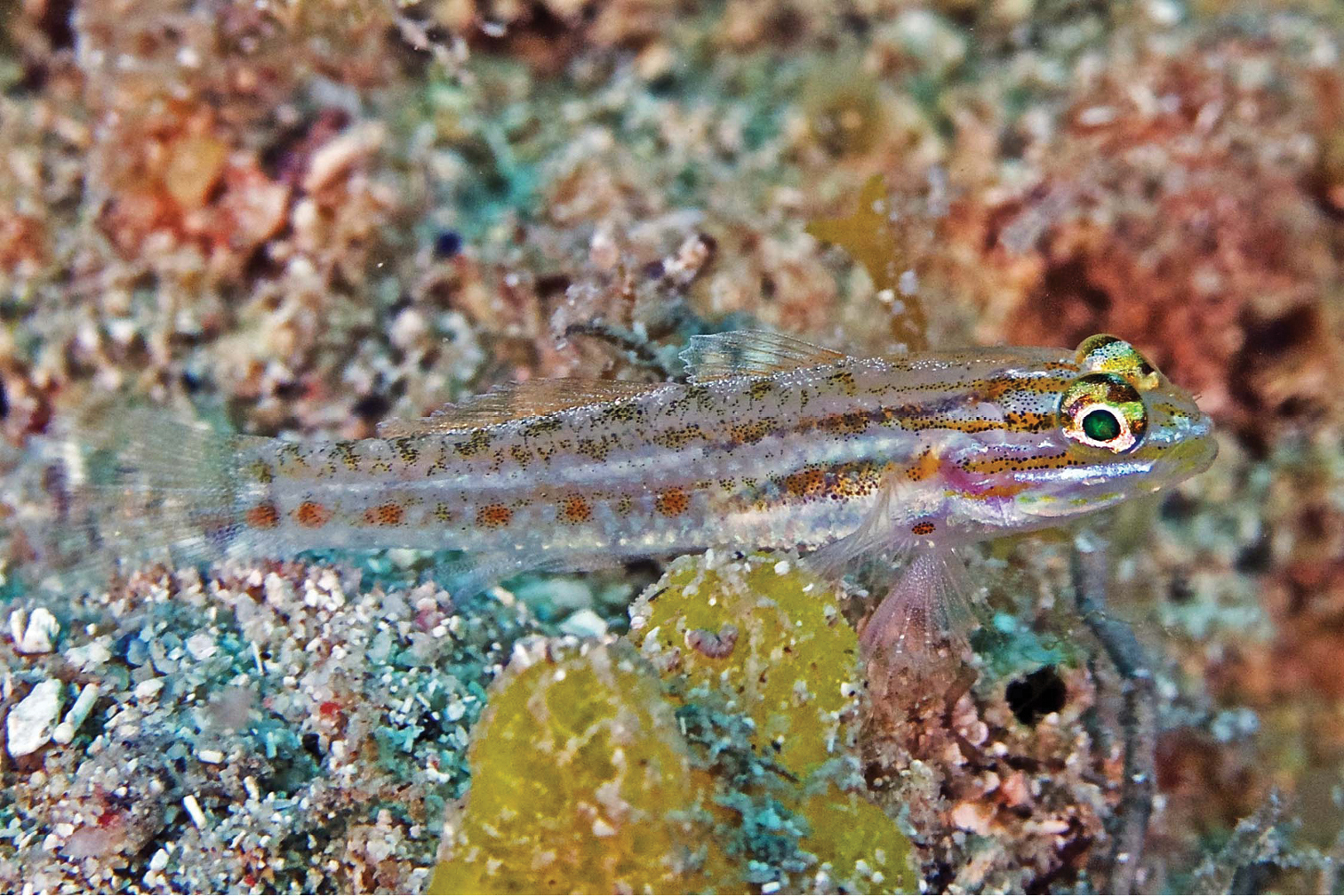

Conservation status
- Least Concern (IUCN 3.1)

Scientific classification
- Kingdom: Animalia
- Phylum: Chordata
- Class: Actinopterygii
- Order: Gobiiformes
- Family: Gobiidae
- Genus: Coryphopterus
- Species: C. punctipectophorus

Binomial name
- Coryphopterus punctipectophorus V. G. Springer, 1960

= Coryphopterus punctipectophorus =

Species of fish

Coryphopterus punctipectophorus, the spotted goby, is a species of goby found in the western Atlantic Ocean.

== Description ==
This species reaches a length of 7.5 cm (3.0 in).
