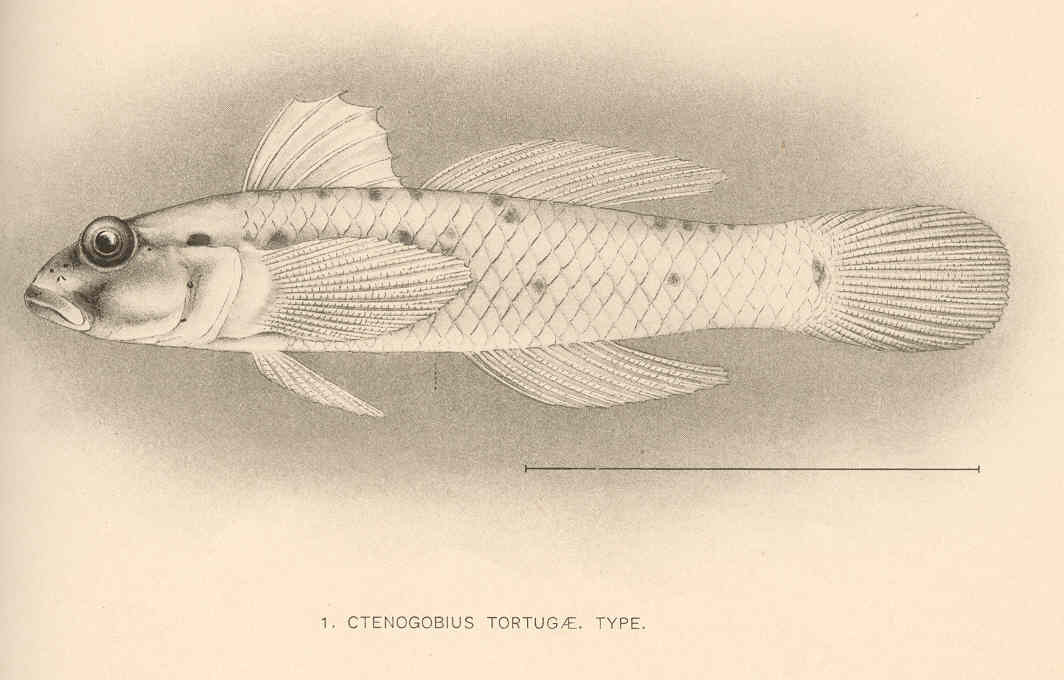

Conservation status
- Vulnerable (IUCN 3.1)

Scientific classification
- Kingdom: Animalia
- Phylum: Chordata
- Class: Actinopterygii
- Order: Gobiiformes
- Family: Gobiidae
- Genus: Coryphopterus
- Species: C. tortugae

Binomial name
- Coryphopterus tortugae (D. S. Jordan, 1904)

Synonyms
- Ctenogobius tortugae Jordan, 1904

= Coryphopterus tortugae =

Species of fish

Coryphopterus tortugae, the patch-reef goby, is a species of goby found in the western-central Atlantic Ocean.

== Description ==
This species reaches a length of 4.1 cm (1.6 in).
