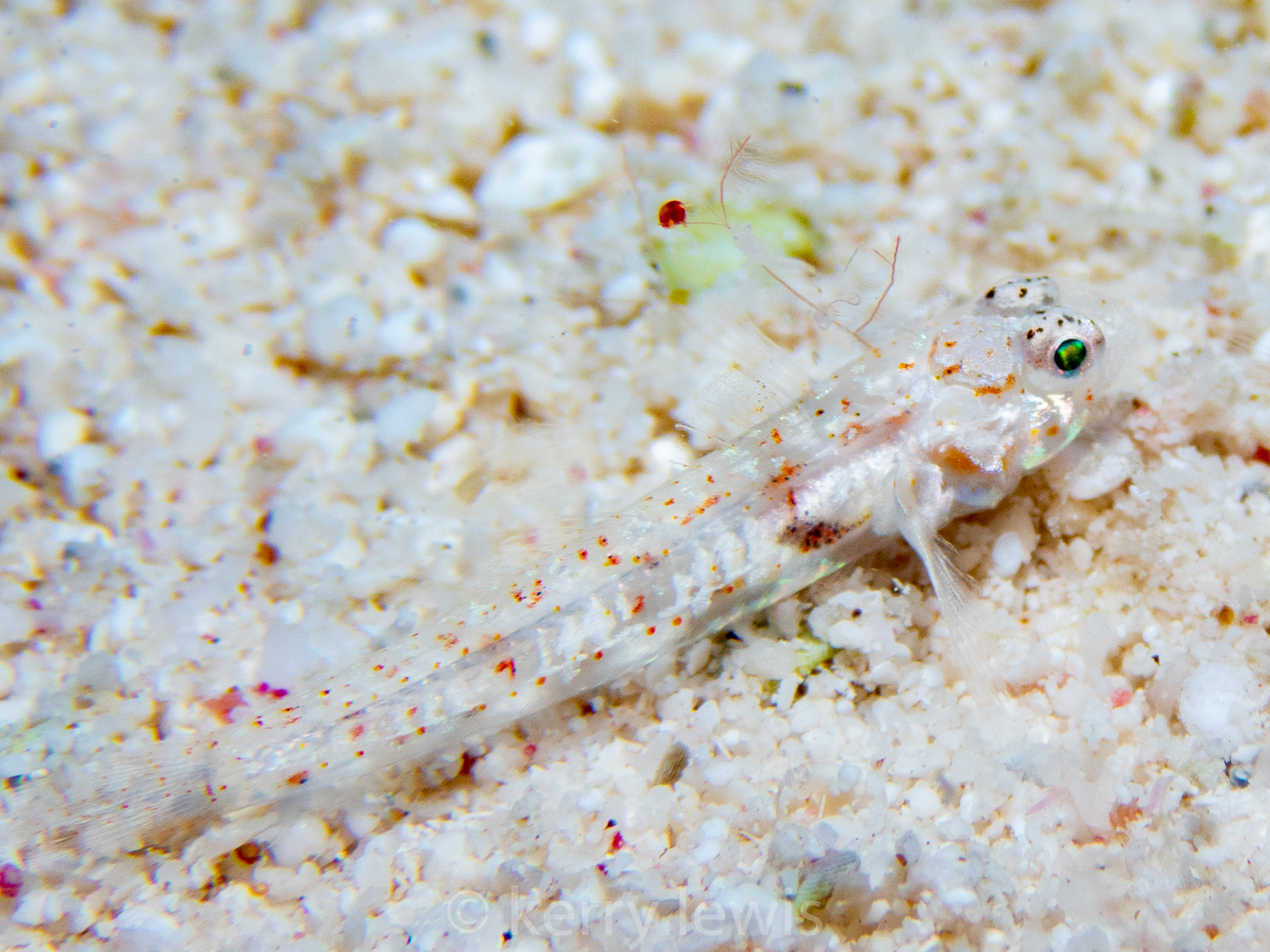

Conservation status
- Data Deficient (IUCN 3.1)

Scientific classification
- Kingdom: Animalia
- Phylum: Chordata
- Class: Actinopterygii
- Order: Gobiiformes
- Family: Gobiidae
- Genus: Coryphopterus
- Species: C. kuna

Binomial name
- Coryphopterus kuna Victor, 2007

= Coryphopterus kuna =

Species of fish

Coryphopterus kuna, commonly known as the Kuna goby, is a species of goby found in the western Atlantic Ocean along the coasts of Panama and Mexico.

== Description ==
This species reaches a length of 1.7 cm (0.67 in).

== Etymology ==
The fish is named after the Kuna indigenous people of Kuna Yala, the region of Atlantic Panama where the holotype was collected, and in recognition of their assistance with marine biological research.
