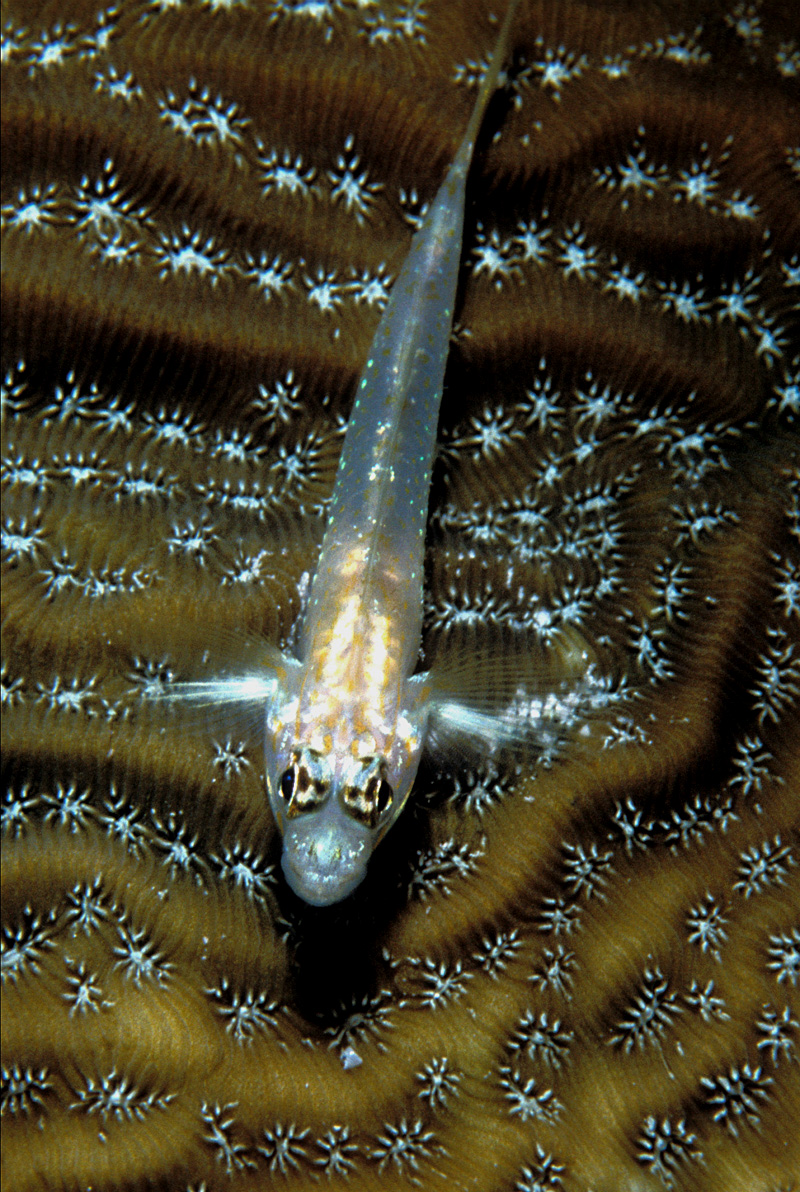
- Bridled goby resting on Graham's sheet coral (Agaricia grahamae)

Conservation status
- Least Concern (IUCN 3.1)

Scientific classification
- Domain: Eukaryota
- Kingdom: Animalia
- Phylum: Chordata
- Class: Actinopterygii
- Order: Gobiiformes
- Family: Gobiidae
- Genus: Coryphopterus
- Species: C. glaucofraenum

Binomial name
- Coryphopterus glaucofraenum T. N. Gill, 1863

= Coryphopterus glaucofraenum =

Species of fish

Coryphopterus glaucofraenum, the bridled goby, is a species of goby native to the Western Atlantic Ocean and the Caribbean Sea from North Carolina to Brazil. It can be found on reefs at depths of from 2 to 45 metres (6.6 to 147.6 ft) in areas of white sand. This species can reach a length of 8 centimetres (3.1 in) TL. It occasionally makes its way into the aquarium trade.
