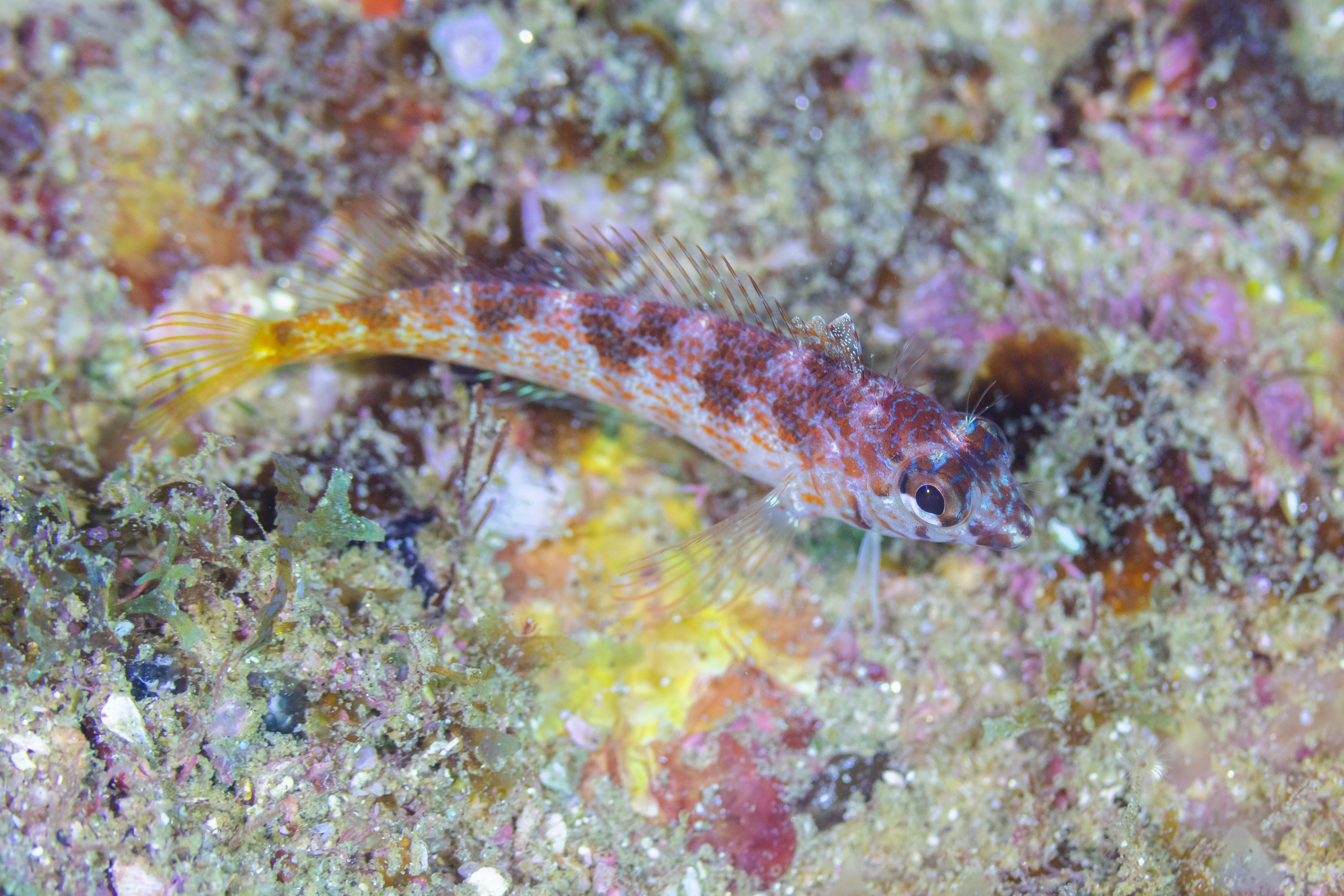

Conservation status
- Least Concern (IUCN 3.1)

Scientific classification
- Kingdom: Animalia
- Phylum: Chordata
- Class: Actinopterygii
- Order: Gobiiformes
- Family: Gobiidae
- Genus: Coryphopterus
- Species: C. urospilus

Binomial name
- Coryphopterus urospilus Ginsburg, 1938

= Coryphopterus urospilus =

Species of fish

Coryphopterus urospilus, the redlight goby, is a species of goby found in the eastern-central Pacific Ocean.

== Description ==
This species reaches a length of 6.5 cm (2.6 in).
