= List of gulfs =

A gulf in geography is a large bay that is an arm of an ocean or sea. Not all geological features which could be considered a gulf have "Gulf" in the name, for example the Bay of Bengal or Arabian Sea.

== Africa ==
Gulf	Countries
Gulf of Gabès	Tunisia
Gulf of Guinea	Liberia/ Ivory Coast/ Ghana/ Togo/ Benin/ Nigeria/ Cameroon/ Equatorial Guinea/ Gabon/ São Tomé and Príncipe/ Republic of the Congo/ Democratic Republic of the Congo/ Angola
Gulf of Hammamet	Tunisia
Gulf of Sirte	Libya
Gulf of Suez	Egypt
Gulf of Tunis	Tunisia

== Americas ==
Gulf	Countries
Gulf of Alaska	United States
Amundsen Gulf	Canada
Gulf of Ancud	Chile
Gulf of Boothia	Canada
Gulf of California	Mexico
Gulf of Cazones	Cuba
Gulf of Darien	Colombia / Panama
Gulf of the Farallones	United States
Gulf of Fonseca	El Salvador / HondurasNicaragua /
Gulf of Gonâve	Haiti
Gulf of Guayaquil	Ecuador / Peru
Gulf of Honduras	Belize / Guatemala/Honduras
Gulf Islands	Canada
Gulf of Maine	United States /Canada
Gulf of Mexico	Mexico / United States/Cuba
Gulf of Nicoya	Costa Rica
Gulf of Panama	Panama
Gulf of Paria	Trinidad and Tobago /Venezuela
Gulf of Saint Lawrence	Canada
Gulf of Santa Catalina	United States / Mexico
San Jorge Gulf	Argentina
San Matias Gulf	Argentina
Gulf of Uraba	Colombia
Gulf of Venezuela	Venezuela

== Asia ==
Gulf	Countries
Gulf of Aden	Djibouti/ Somalia/ Yemen
Albay Gulf	Philippines
Gulf of Aqaba	Egypt/ Israel/ Jordan/ Saudi Arabia
Asid Gulf	Philippines
Gulf of Bahrain	Saudi Arabia/ Qatar/ Bahrain
Davao Gulf	Philippines
Gulf of Khambhat	India
Gulf of Kutch	India
Lagonoy Gulf	Philippines
Leyte Gulf	Philippines
Lingayen Gulf	Philippines
Gulf of Mannar	India/Sri Lanka
Moro Gulf	Philippines
Gulf of Oman	United Arab Emirates/ Iran/Oman /Pakistan
Panay Gulf	Philippines
Persian Gulf	Iran/Iraq, Kuwait/Saudi Arabia/Bahrain, Qatar/United Arab Emirates/Oman
Peter the Great Gulf	Russia
Ragay Gulf	Philippines
Gulf of Tartary	Russia
Gulf of Thailand	Cambodia/Thailand/Vietnam/Malaysia
Gulf of Tonkin	Vietnam/China

== Europe ==
Gulf	Countries
Ambracian Gulf	Greece
Argolic Gulf	Greece
Bay of Biscay	France / Spain
Gulf of Bothnia	Finland / Sweden
Gulf of Burgas	Bulgaria
Gulf of Cádiz	Portugal / Spain
Gulf of Corinth	Greece
Gulf of Euboea	Greece
Gulf of Finland	Finland / Estonia
Gulf of Genoa	Italy
Gulf of İzmir	Greece / Turkey
Gulf of Kuşadası	Greece / Turkey
Gulf of Lion	France
Malian Gulf	Greece
Gulf of Morbihan	France
Gulf of Odesa	Ukraine
Gulf of Oristano	Italy
Pagasetic Gulf	Greece
Gulf of Patras	Greece
Gulf of Roses	Spain
Gulf of Saint-Malo	France / United Kingdom
Gulf of Salerno	Italy
Saronic Gulf	Greece
Gulf of Riga	Latvia
Gulf of Taranto	Italy
Gulf of Varna	Bulgaria
Gulf of Venice	Italy / SloveniaItaly / Croatia

== Oceania ==
Gulf	Countries
Cambridge Gulf	Australia
Gulf of Carpentaria	Australia
Exmouth Gulf	Australia
Hauraki Gulf	New Zealand
Gulf St Vincent	Australia
Spencer Gulf	Australia
