= Coryphopterus alloides =

Conservation status
- Vulnerable (IUCN 3.1)

Scientific classification
- Kingdom: Animalia
- Phylum: Chordata
- Class: Actinopterygii
- Order: Gobiiformes
- Family: Gobiidae
- Genus: Coryphopterus
- Species: C. alloides

Binomial name
- Coryphopterus alloides J. E. Böhlke & C. R. Robins, 1960

Species of fish

Coryphopterus alloides, the barfin goby, is a species of goby found in the western Atlantic Ocean from southern Florida and the Bahamas to Belize.

== Description ==
This species reaches a length of 4.0 cm (1.6 in).
