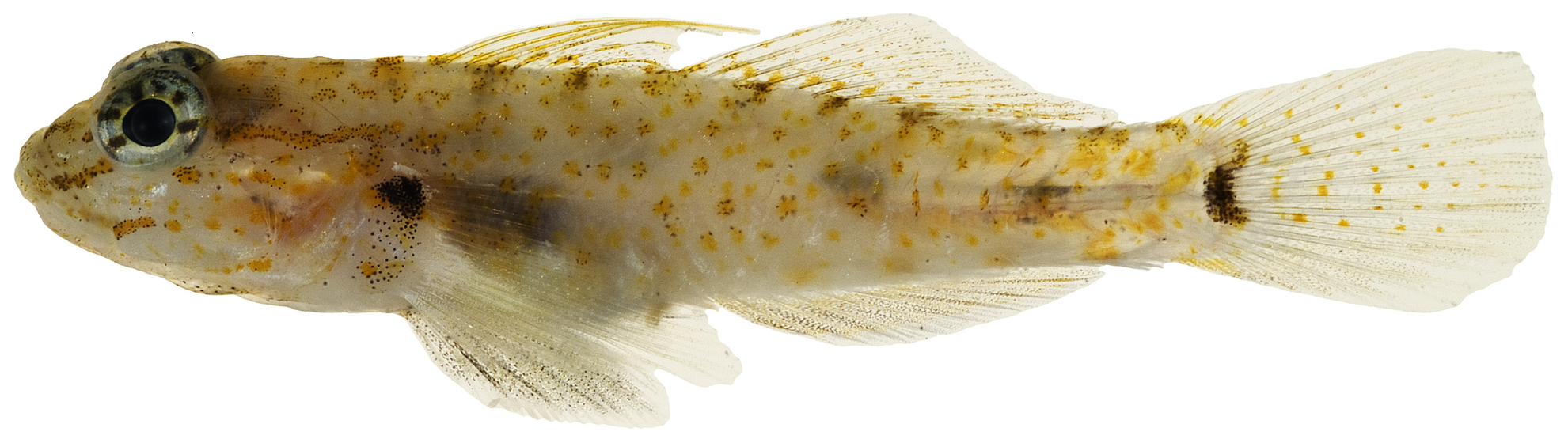
- Coryphopterus thrix

Scientific classification
- Kingdom: Animalia
- Phylum: Chordata
- Class: Actinopterygii
- Order: Gobiiformes
- Family: Gobiidae
- Subfamily: Gobiinae
- Genus: Coryphopterus; T. N. Gill, 1863

Type species
- Coryphopterus glaucofraenum T. N. Gill, 1863

= Coryphopterus =

Genus of fishes

Coryphopterus is a genus of gobies primarily found in the western Atlantic Ocean, although some species are found in the Indian and/or Pacific oceans.

== Species ==
There are currently 14 recognized species in this genus:

- Coryphopterus alloides J. E. Böhlke & C. R. Robins, 1960 (Barfin goby)
- Coryphopterus curasub C. C. Baldwin & D. R. Robertson, 2015 (Yellow-spotted sand goby)
- Coryphopterus dicrus J. E. Böhlke & C. R. Robins, 1960 (Colon goby)
- Coryphopterus eidolon J. E. Böhlke & C. R. Robins, 1960 (Pallid goby)
- Coryphopterus glaucofraenum T. N. Gill, 1863 (Bridled goby)
- Coryphopterus hyalinus J. E. Böhlke & C. R. Robins, 1962 (Glass goby)
- Coryphopterus kuna Victor, 2007
- Coryphopterus lipernes J. E. Böhlke & C. R. Robins, 1962 (Peppermint goby)
- Coryphopterus personatus (D. S. Jordan & J. C. Thompson, 1905) (Masked goby)
- Coryphopterus punctipectophorus V. G. Springer, 1960 (Spotted goby)
- Coryphopterus thrix J. E. Böhlke & C. R. Robins, 1960 (Bartail goby)
- Coryphopterus tortugae (D. S. Jordan, 1904) (Patch-reef goby)
- Coryphopterus urospilus Ginsburg, 1938 (Redlight goby)
- Coryphopterus venezuelae Cervigón, 1966
