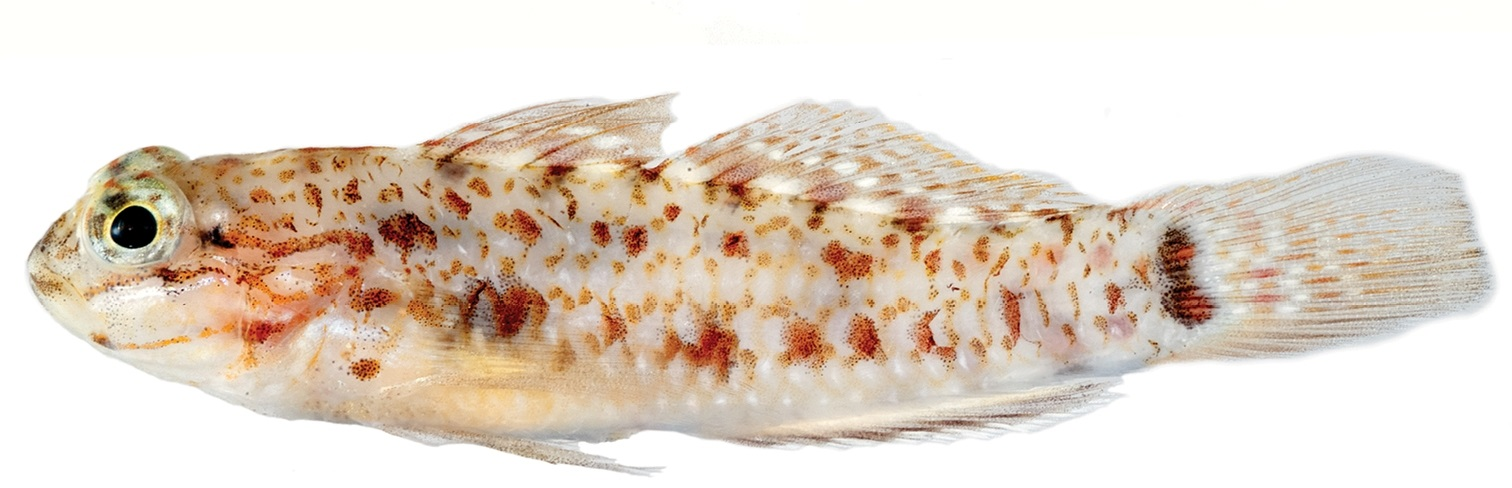

Conservation status
- Least Concern (IUCN 3.1)

Scientific classification
- Kingdom: Animalia
- Phylum: Chordata
- Class: Actinopterygii
- Order: Gobiiformes
- Family: Gobiidae
- Genus: Coryphopterus
- Species: C. dicrus

Binomial name
- Coryphopterus dicrus J. E. Böhlke & C. R. Robins, 1960

= Coryphopterus dicrus =

Species of fish

Coryphopterus dicrus, the Colon goby, is a species of goby found in the western Atlantic Ocean from southern Florida and the Bahamas to Brazil.

== Description ==
This species reaches a length of 5.0 cm (2.0 in).
