= Aiolochroia crassa =

Scientific classification
- Kingdom: Animalia
- Phylum: Porifera
- Class: Demospongiae
- Order: Verongiida
- Family: Aplysinidae
- Genus: Aiolochroia
- Species: A. crassa

Binomial name
- Aiolochroia crassa (Hyatt, 1875)

Species of sponge

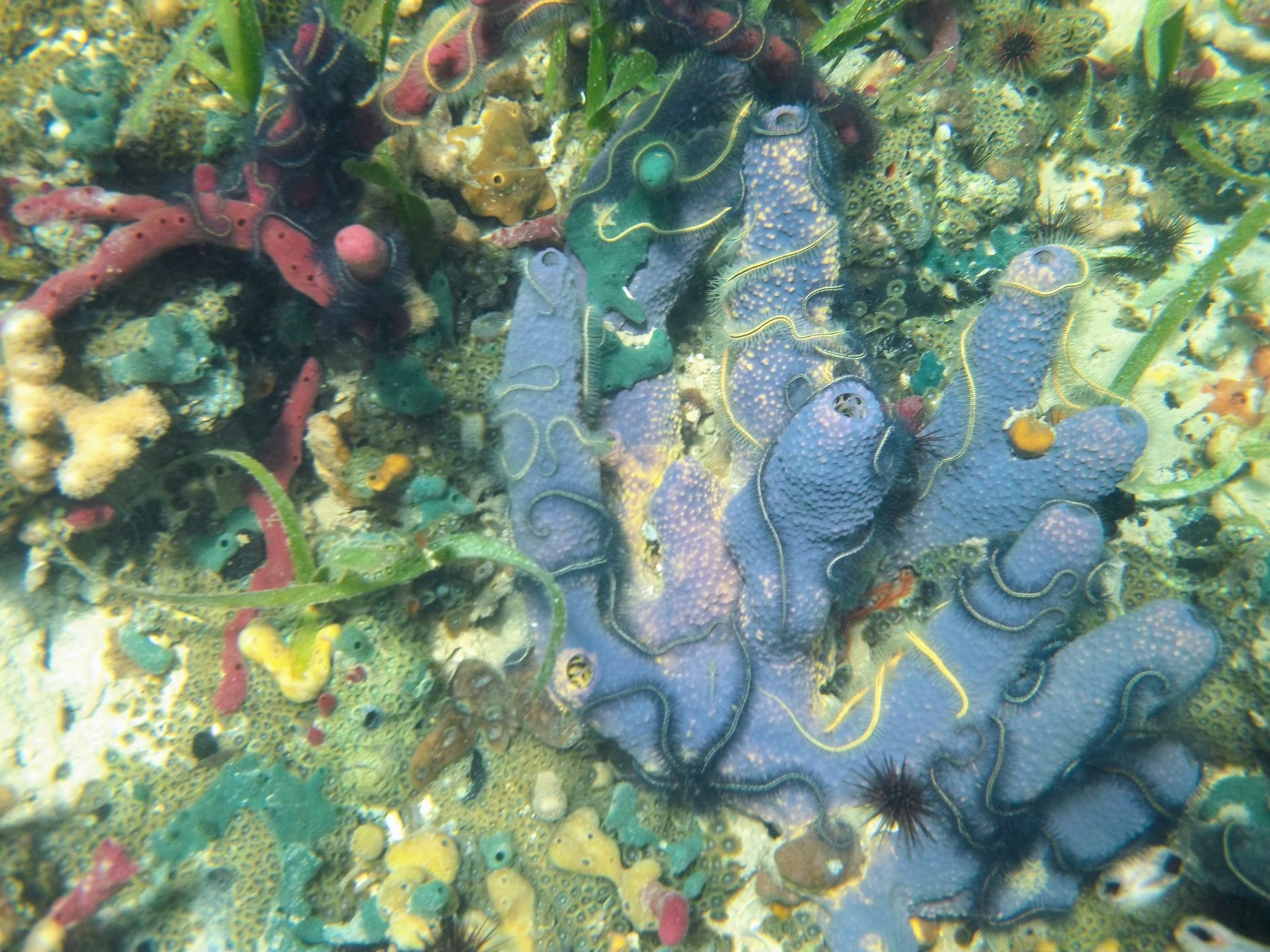
Aiolochroia crassa

Aiolochroia crassa, also known as branching tube sponge' and bleeding cake sponge, is a colorful sponge species originally described in 1875 by Alpheus Hyatt. Aiolochroia crassa got the name of branching tube sponge due to its large branching tubes.

== Description ==
Aiolochroia crassa comes in many different colors and shapes. External colors are normally green, orange, bright yellow, purple or sometimes multiple of these colors. Internally the color of the branching tube sponge is usually yellow. Aiolochroia crassa grows in large cone shaped projections known as "lobes" pointing outward from the base, indicative of its name the branching tube sponge. These projections are normally up to 1 cm apart and about 3-4 mm high. At the top of these projections are Oscules opening about 1-2 cm wide. Aiolochroia crassa has no spicules and is made only of protein spongin fibers. These spongin fibers lead to the sponge be very thick and many have described it to be "cheese like." In fact Aiolochroia crassa has the largest sponging fiber size than any other sponge in the Verongida order. As previously mentioned, this sponge is very hard to identify in the field. This is due to it having many different colors and appearance types. The larger forms of this sponge can get as large as 15 to 45 cm.

== Distribution ==
Aiolochroia crassa can be found on reefs over a very large geographic range from South Florida to the Caribbean Sea. They also can be found at numerous depths ranging 3 – 30 meters in depth. In these locations they are commonly found in seagrasses and reefs. They are very dominant in reef environments, especially in the southern and northeast Caribbean where at certain reefs they are the most dominant sponge. Particularly, in inner reef slopes they are especially dominant compared to other reef zones. This dominance has been attributed by some to the defensive properties of the sponge allowing it to have higher fitness.

== Feeding and diet ==
Aiolochroia crassa has a very similar diet and feeding style to most Demospongiae. It is a filter feeder which pumps water through with its choanocytes collecting small particles to consume. This sponge family has a POC diet of about 80 percent particulate organic matter and 20 percent microscopically resolvable particulate material.

== Biomedical uses ==
Aiolochroia crassa has drawn lots of research attention in the medical field due to bioactive bromotyrosine alkalois found inside of them. This compound is partially responsible for healing the tissues of damaged sponges. The outlook of this compound is still unknown as its discovery was relatively recent. Some scientist believe it could be used in future medical advancements. Furthermore, they have discovered a new protein within these sponges which has immense medical benefits. This protein, called AcrL, can stop bacteria from forming protective layers that make them harder to kill. This means that when combined with antibiotics it could create an extremely effective treatment to infection. These antimicrobial effects discovered by a group using two different types of microscopy; canning electron microscopy and confocal laser scanning microscopy.
