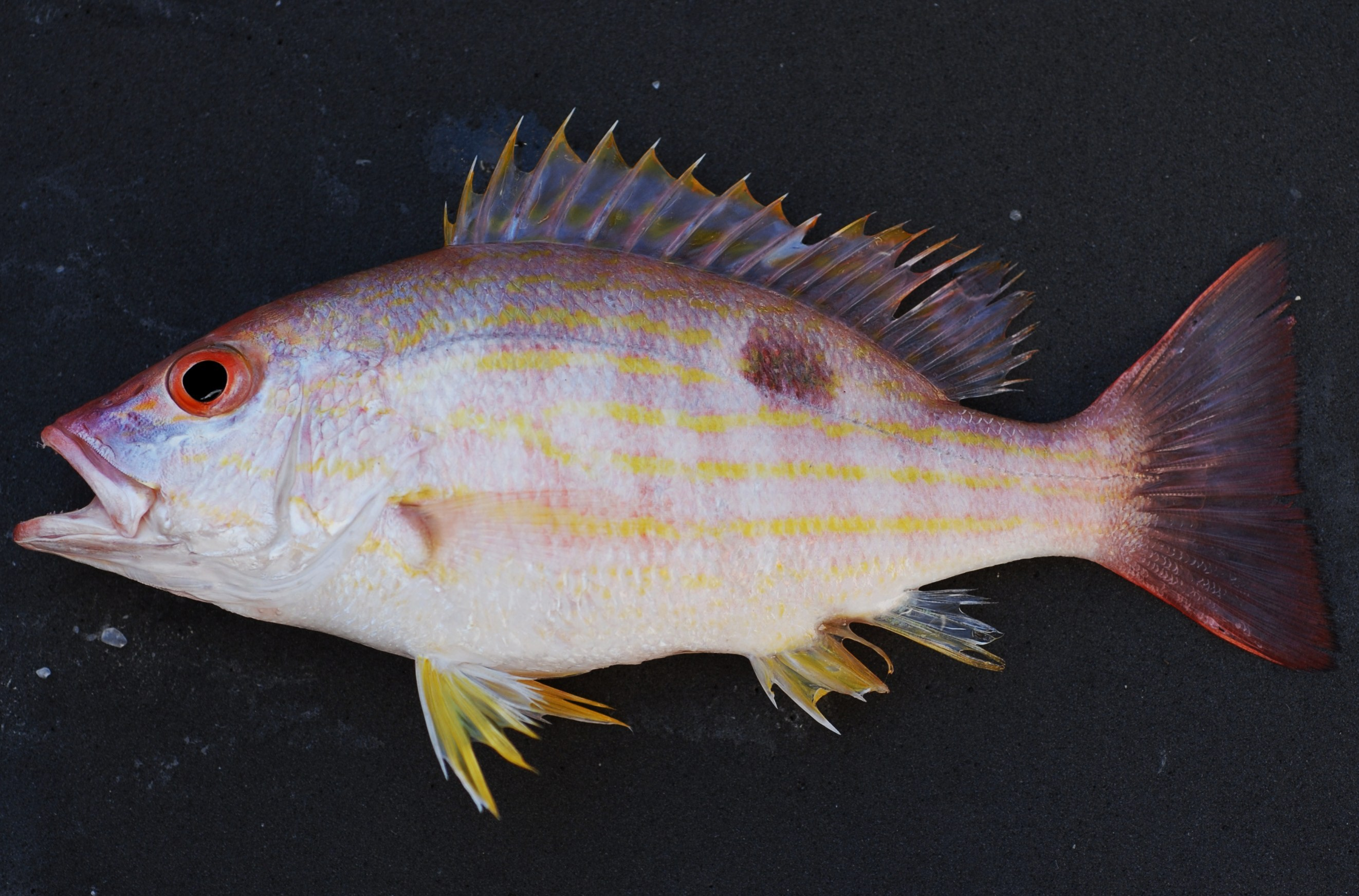

Conservation status
- Near Threatened (IUCN 3.1)

Scientific classification
- Kingdom: Animalia
- Phylum: Chordata
- Class: Actinopterygii
- Division: Teleostei
- Order: Acanthuriformes
- Family: Lutjanidae
- Genus: Lutjanus
- Species: L. synagris

Binomial name
- Lutjanus synagris (Linnaeus, 1758)
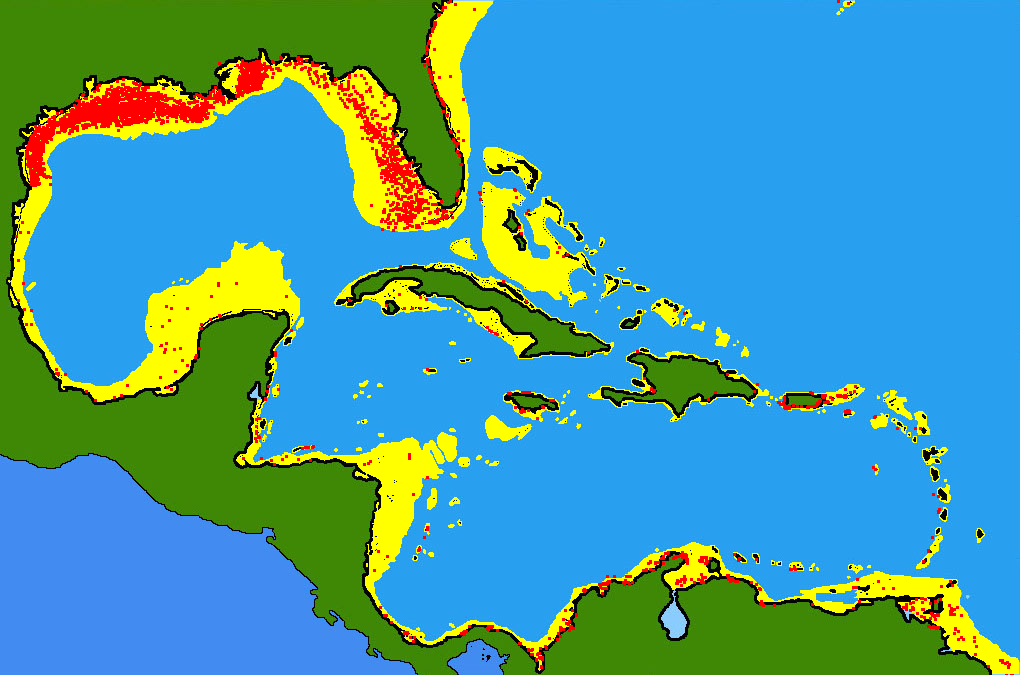

Synonyms
- Sparus synagris Linnaeus, 1758; Sparus vermicularis Bloch & J. G. Schneider, 1801; Lutjanus aubrietii Desmarest, 1823; Mesoprion uninotatus G. Cuvier, 1828; Lutjanus brachypterus Cope, 1871; Neomaenis megalophthalmus Evermann & M. C. Marsh, 1900; Prionodes sanctiandrewsi Fowler, 1944

= Lane snapper =

Species of fish

The lane snapper (Lutjanus synagris), Mexican snapper, redtail snapper or spot snapper is a species of marine ray-finned fish, a snapper belonging to the family Lutjanidae. It is native to the western Atlantic Ocean.

== Taxonomy ==
The lane snapper was first formally described in 1758 as Sparus synagris by Carolus Linnaeus in the 10th edition of the Systema Naturae with the type locality given as America septentrionali, i.e. the Bahamas. The specific name synagris is an Ancient Greek name for the common dentex (Dentex dentex) which the lane snapper was thought to be similar to.

== Description ==
The lane snapper has an oblong, compressed body. It has a sharply pointed snout, With a pair of front and a pair of rear nostrils which are simple holes, it has a relatively large mouth with a moderately protrusible upper jaw which has most of its length below the cheek bone when the mouth is shut., Each jaw has one or more rows of sharp, conical teeth with a few of these being enlarged to form canines. The vomerine teeth are arranged in an anchor shaped patch of teeth with a short rearwards extension along the middle of the palate and there is a pair of tooth patches ar either side of the palate. The preopercle is serrated, and has a weakly developed incision and knob. It has a continuous dorsal fin which has 10 spines and 12-13 soft rays, with a slight incision sometimes visible between the spines and soft rays, the anal fin has 3 spines and 8-9 soft rays. It has relatively short pectoral fins which do not extend as far as the anus and contain 15-16 fin rays. The caudal fin is emarginate. This fish attains a maximum total length of 60 cm (24 in), although 25 cm (9.8 in) is more typical, and the maximum published weight is 3.5 kg (7.7 lb). This species has two colour phases, a deep-water phase which is darker and more distinctive than the colour of the shallow-water resting phase. In both phases the upper flanks and the back are pink to red with a green tint on the back. The lower flanks and abdomen are silver with a yellow hue. There are 3-4 yellow stripes on the head which extend from the snout to the eye, The flanks are marked with 8-10 yellow to pink longitudinal stripes, with a further 3-4 underneath the front dorsal fin ray. They have an indistinct black spot underneath the soft rayed part of the dorsal fin. The fins are may be yellow to red.

== Distribution and habitat ==
The lane snapper is found in the Western Atlantic Ocean where it occurs as far north as North Carolina and Bermuda south through the Gulf of Mexico and the Caribbean Sea, along the coast of South America as far south as Santa Catarina, Brazil. It occurs over reefs and sandy bottoms with algae or sea grass at depths between 30 and 122 m (98 and 400 ft). The juveniles live in sheltered inshore waters.

== Biology ==
Lane snapper are sedentary, staying in a home range, after they have become adult except when spawning.

=== Feeding ===
Lane snappers are opportunistic, nocturnal predators feeding on a diverse range of animals. Known prey includes smaller fishes, cephalopods, gastropods, and crustaceans such as shrimps and crabs.

=== Reproduction ===
Lane snapper form spawning aggregations, off Cuba these aggregations are found from March until September, peaking in activity in July and August. Off Puerto Rico spawning reaches its zenith in May. They are broadcast spawners, the fertilised eggs drift on the currents and hatch after 23 hours. The larvae are little known but settle at a length of about 1 cm (0.39 in).

=== Predators ===
The lane snapper is preyed upon by larger fishes and sharks.

== Fisheries and conservation ==
The white meat of the lane snapper is sold in supermarkets throughout Mexico. Lane snapper are more typically caught in shallower waters than many other snappers, most commonly yellowtail snapper and gray snapper. Larger specimens can be found in somewhat deeper waters, but are typically less plentiful. The consumption of its flesh has been known to result in cases of ciguatera poisoning.

Lane snapper are caught with beach seines, boat seines, traps, handlines, and bottom trawls. Shrimp fisheries take for a large portion of the total catch of this snapper, due to the juveniles preference for soft bottom s with high populations of shrimps.

The lane snapper stocks have shown steep declines as a result of overfishing in much of its range. For this reason the IUCN have assessed this species as Near Threatened.
