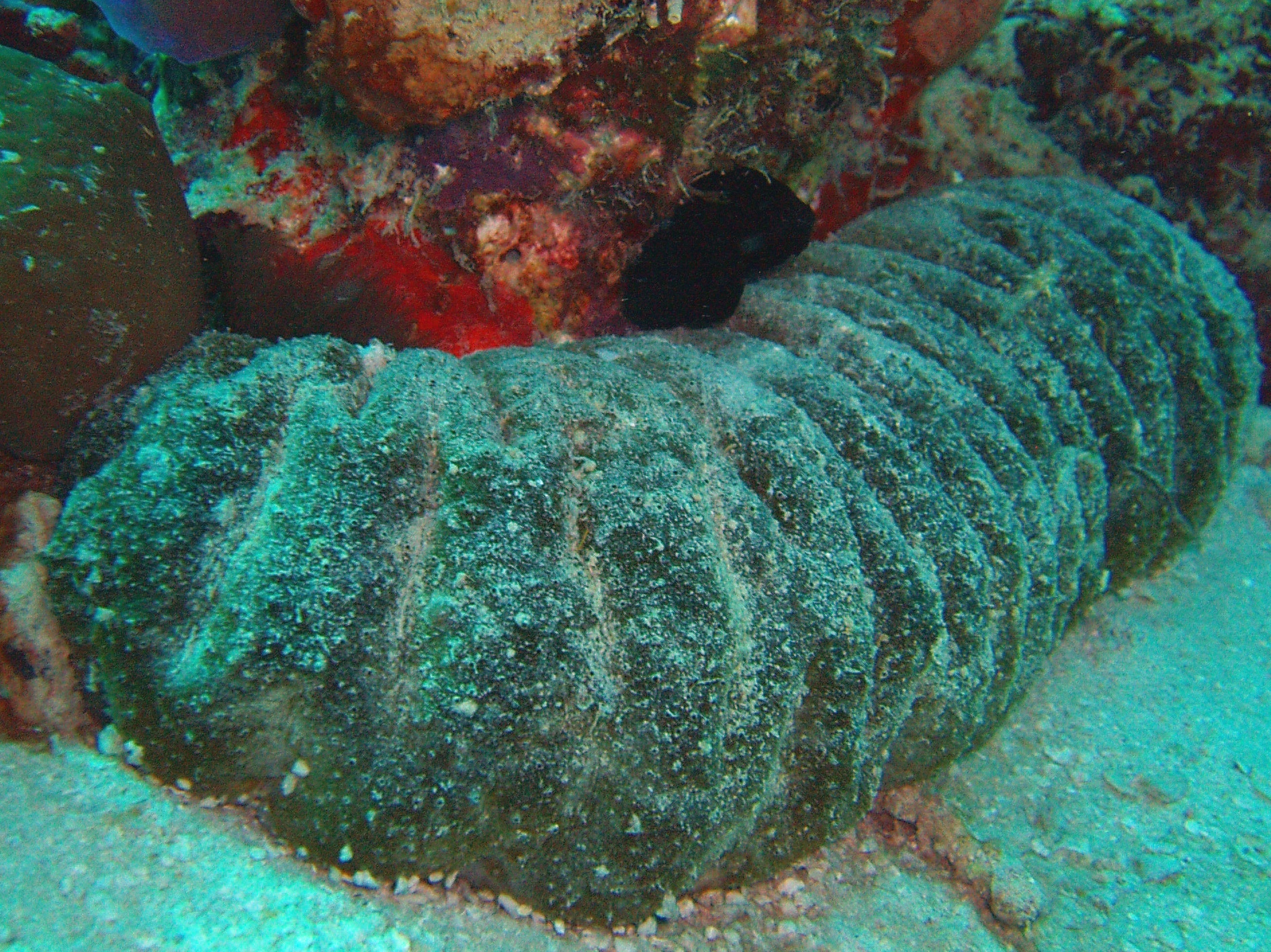

Conservation status
- Least Concern (IUCN 3.1)

- Apparently Secure (NatureServe)

Scientific classification
- Kingdom: Animalia
- Phylum: Echinodermata
- Class: Holothuroidea
- Order: Holothuriida
- Family: Holothuriidae
- Genus: Holothuria
- Species: H. mexicana

Binomial name
- Holothuria mexicana (Ludwig Diels, 1875)

Synonyms
- Holothuria africana Théel, 1886

= Holothuria mexicana =

Species of sea cucumber

Holothuria mexicana, the donkey dung sea cucumber, is commonly found in the Caribbean and the Azores. It is a commercially important aspidochirote (sediment feeding) sea cucumber that can reach a total length of 50 cm (20 in).

== Description ==
This sea cucumber is transversely wrinkled and reaches 50 cm (20 in) in total length. It has a top surface that is dull brown or grey with occasional warts. The bottom surface is reddish, orange or pale and is uniformly covered in tube feet. Populations are unimodal and have a 1:1 male to female sex ratio.

== Distribution and habitat ==
This species is found throughout the Caribbean and reaches southern Brazil.

It is a shallow or demersal water species most commonly found between 2 and 10 m (7 and 33 ft) depth and up to 20 m (66 ft) depth. It inhabits sandy bottoms with calm waters including seagrass beds, offshore reefs or mangroves.

== Diet ==
Holothuria mexicana feeds on sediments at the bottom of the Atlantic Ocean, specifically consuming organic matter such as algae, tiny aquatic organisms and waste materials. Metals, such as copper, nickel, lead and zinc associated with coastal pollution, can bioaccumulate within H. mexicana tissues. Therefore, this species has been suggested as a biological indicator for these metals.

== Predation ==
Holothuria mexicana is a food source for people, and is actively caught for consumption off the shores of Nicaragua, Panama and Venezuela.

Natural parasites on H. mexicana are bacteria, protozoans and metazoans. The metazoans that commonly feed on these sea cucumbers are turbellarians, gastropods, copepods, crabs and fishes.

== Reproduction ==
Minimum size at sexual maturity is between 13 cm (5 in) and 20 cm (8 in) total length and 150 g (5 oz) gutted weight, though smaller sexually mature individuals have been found.

Holothuria mexicana spawns throughout the year but has peak spawning periods that varies with geography, which may linked to temperature. Spawning occurs from May to July in Panama, August to September in Florida, and September to October in Curaçao.

During spawning, females forcefully expel all their eggs into the water in a single burst from their gonopore (the opening where gametes are released). Both males and females sometimes wave their tentacles around during spawning which may aid in fertilization by mixing the sperm and eggs. After fertilization, eggs develop into non-feeding auricular larvae develop in ~64 hours.

== Use as food ==
Sea cucumbers are harvested by snorkelling or surface-supplied diving for human consumption. Although some species are caught for local consumption, most species are exported to China where it is considered an important health food. The ease to catch sea cucumbers, high commercial value and slow recruitment rates have led to global declines in sea cucumber populations and fisheries on less commercially valuable species.

There are fisheries for H. mexicana in Panama, Nicaragua and Venezuela. In Panama, the species has a low economic value due to its tough and rigid texture but is fished because of decline of other commercial sea cucumbers. In 1997, 25 fishers took part in a 30-day fishing period where over 750,000 sea cucumbers of three species (H. mexicana, Isostichopus badionotus, Astichopus multifidus) were caught. Sea cucumber fishing is now banned in Panama but illegal fishing has been reported. Holothuria mexicana have small population sizes and were in high risk of collapse in the area if the same level of fishing had continued.

In Venezuela, the sea cucumber fishery began in 1991-1992 but was shut down by 1995 due to poor fisheries regulation. Illegal fishing continued, however, as 500 kg (1,100 lb) of H. mexicana worth US$150,000 was confiscated in the Archipelago Los Roques National Park in 1996. In 2005, China had reported that 0.5 tonnes of sea cucumber were imported from Venezuela.
