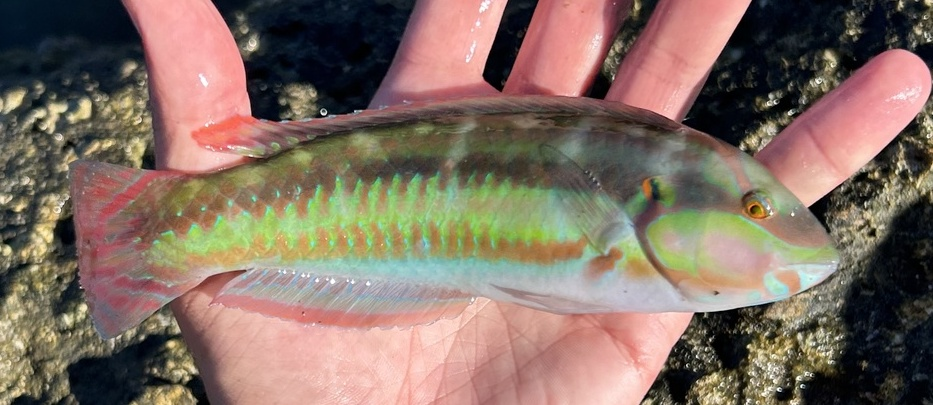
- Terminal phase
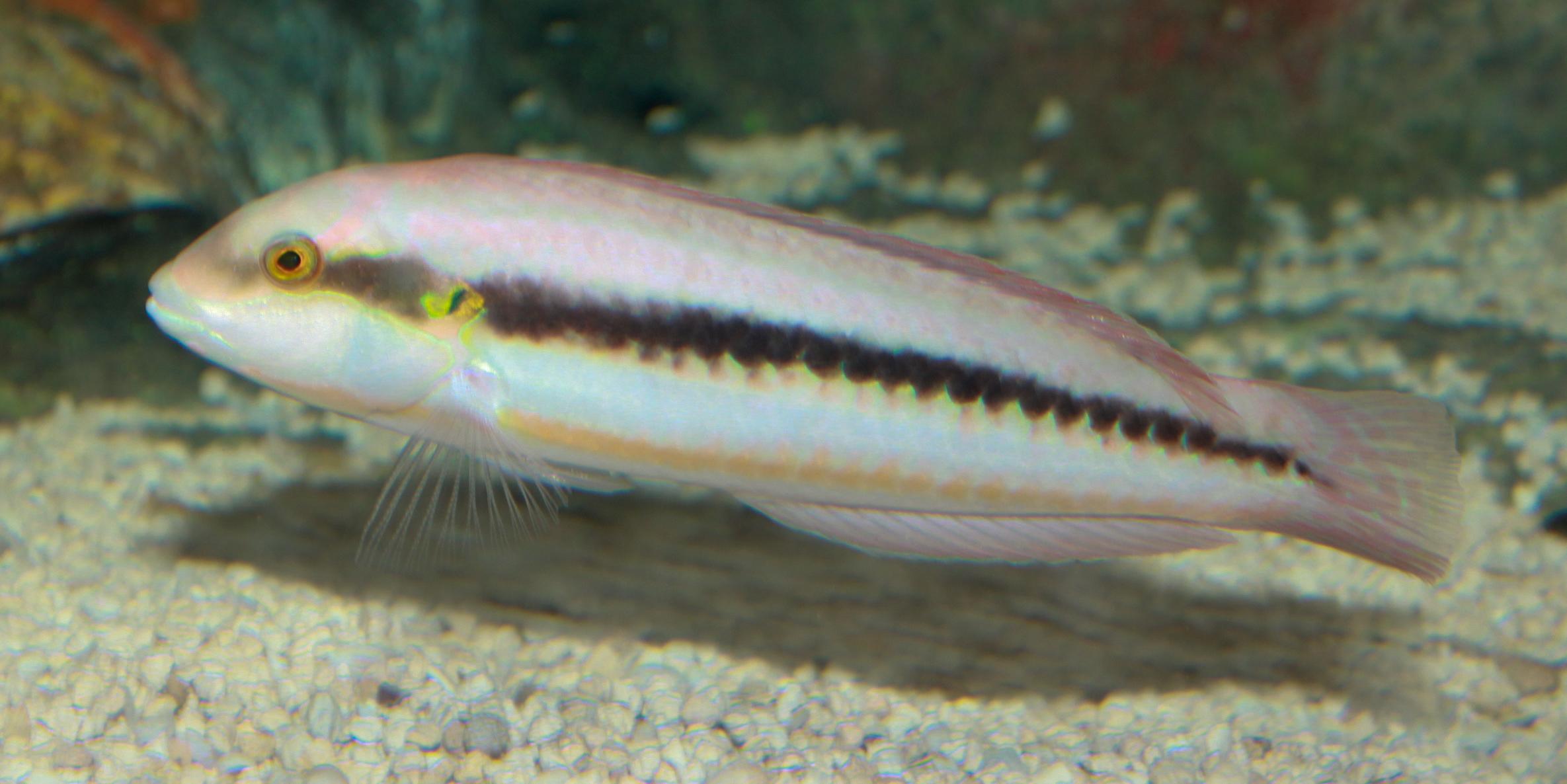
- Initial phase

Conservation status
- Least Concern (IUCN 3.1)

Scientific classification
- Kingdom: Animalia
- Phylum: Chordata
- Class: Actinopterygii
- Division: Teleostei
- Order: Labriformes
- Family: Labridae
- Genus: Halichoeres
- Species: H. bivittatus

Binomial name
- Halichoeres bivittatus (Bloch, 1791)

Synonyms
- List: Labrus bivittatus Bloch, 1791; Labrus psittaculus Lacépède, 1801; Labrus multicostatus Gronow, 1854; Julis humeralis Poey, 1860; Choerojulis grandisquamis T. N. Gill, 1863; Choerojulis arangoi Poey, 1876; Platyglossus florealis D. S. Jordan & C. H. Gilbert, 1882

= Slippery dick =

Species of fish

The slippery dick (Halichoeres bivittatus) is a species of wrasse native to shallow, tropical waters of the western Atlantic Ocean.

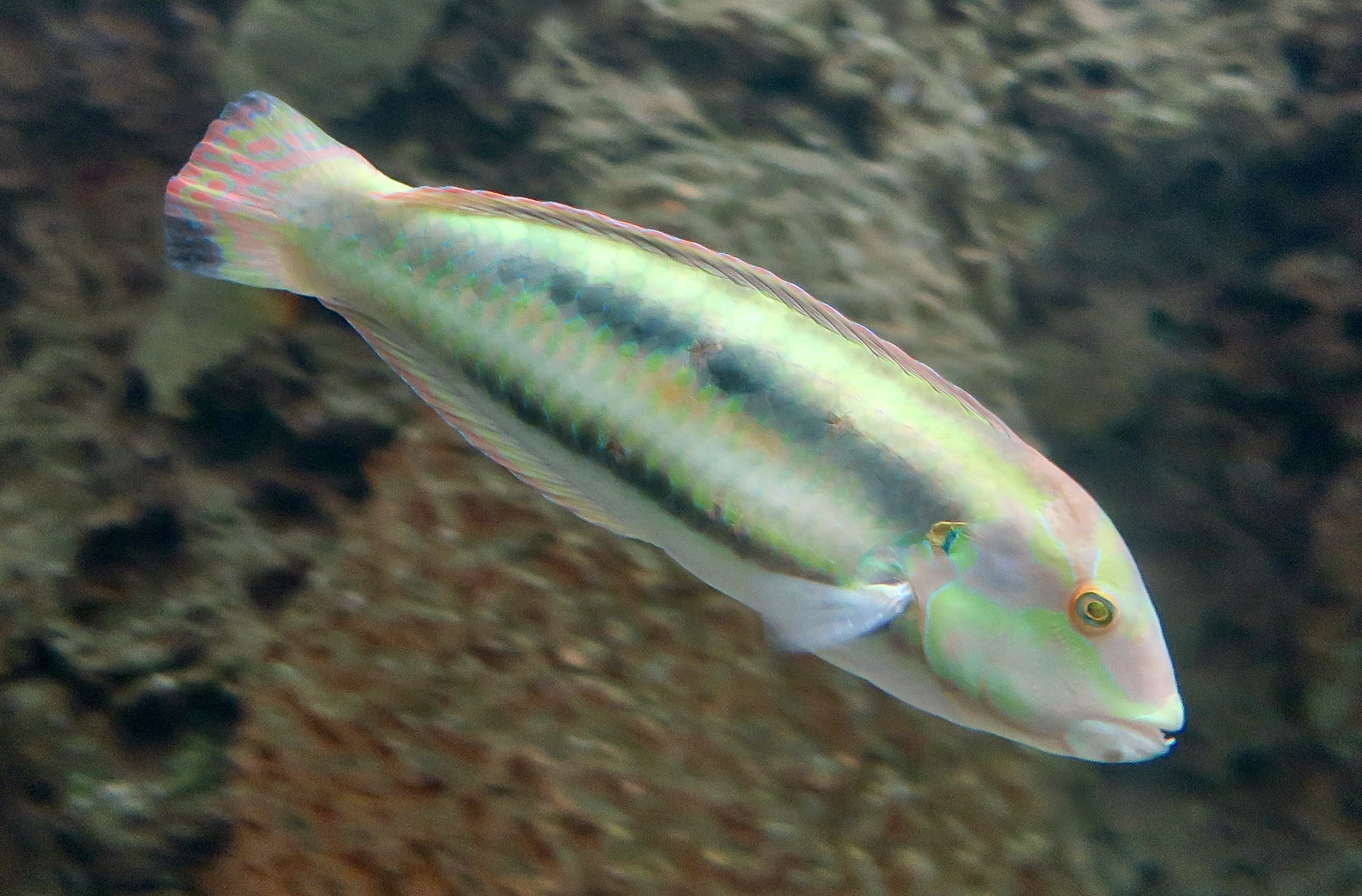
A terminal phase male at the New York Aquarium

== Description ==
The slippery dick wrasse is a small fish that can reach a maximum length of 35 cm (14 in). It has a thin, elongate body with a terminal mouth, and its body coloration has three phases during its life:

1. The juvenile phase. The body is usually whitish, still with the two longitudinal stripes and the spot up to the pectoral fin, as in the initial phase.
2. The initial phase is when the juvenile becomes a female. The background body coloration is mainly whitish with pink shade, and the sides have two dark longitudinal stripes. The median one is usually black extending from the snout and via the eye to the base of the tail. The second one is a paler lateral stripe further below. The upper stripe incorporates a bicolored (green and yellow turning later to black) spot where it crosses the edge of the gills (this is present in all phases). Intermediates vary greatly, from shades of light purple to dark brown. Juveniles are usually white and have two dark stripes, but the lower (abdominal) stripe may be faint.
3. The terminal phase is when the fish becomes a male, so the body coloration turns to green with two longitudinal dark stripes. The head and tail are covered with pink lines; it has a small black dot up to the pectoral fin.

== Distribution and habitat ==
The slippery dick wrasse is widespread throughout the tropical and subtropical waters of the western Atlantic Ocean. It can be found from North Carolina and Bermuda to Brazil, including the Gulf of Mexico and the Caribbean Sea area.

The slippery dick wrasse is generally reef-associated at depths from 1 to 15 m (3.3 to 49.2 ft), but it's not common in seagrass.

== Biology ==
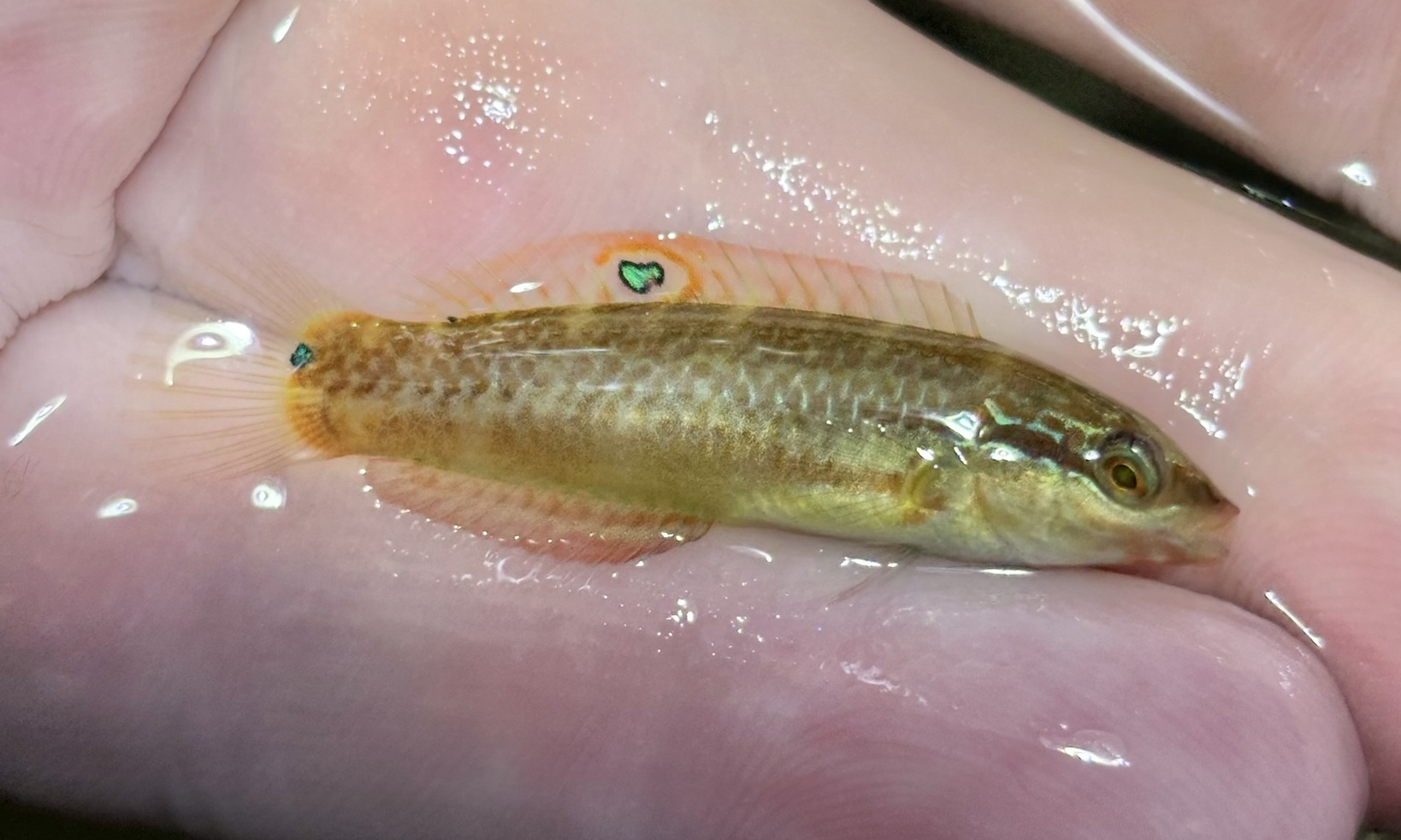
Juvenile, in North Carolina

This species feeds on benthic invertebrates, including crabs, small fishes, sea urchins and ophiuroids, polychaetes, and gastropods.

=== Sex change ===
It is a protogynous hermaphrodite. The species is diandric, i.e., individuals when born can be either male or female, but females can change sex and become males. Males that are born male are "primary" males, while males that are the result of sex change are "secondary" males. The bright colour pattern of large mature males is called the "terminal phase". The less vibrant colour pattern of females and smaller males is called the "initial phase".

=== Reproduction ===
Both terminal and initial phase male will reproduce, but while terminal phase males usually spawn in pairs within territories that they defend, initial phase males usually spawn in large groups. Terminal phase males may also occasionally join group spawning events, and initial phase males occasionally interfere with the pair spawning of terminal males.

These fish form leks while breeding. In North Carolina, males defend temporary territories with peak spawning in May and June. Pair spawning typically occurs between females and terminal phase males; initial phase males occasionally try to insert themselves into the spawning event.

== Status and threats ==
This species is widespread and very common throughout much of its range in the Caribbean and Florida, although it is uncommon in northeastern Brazil. There are no major threats known to this species, and population trends are unknown. It is listed as Least Concern (LC) by the IUCN.
