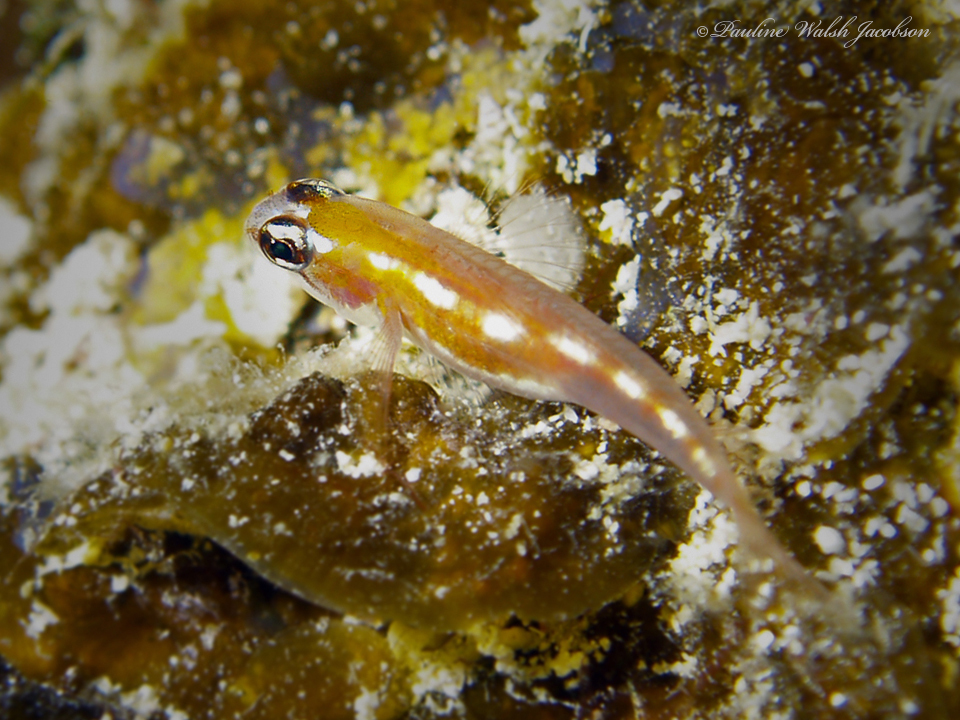

Conservation status
- Vulnerable (IUCN 3.1)

Scientific classification
- Kingdom: Animalia
- Phylum: Chordata
- Class: Actinopterygii
- Order: Gobiiformes
- Family: Gobiidae
- Genus: Coryphopterus
- Species: C. hyalinus

Binomial name
- Coryphopterus hyalinus J. E. Böhlke & C. R. Robins, 1962

= Coryphopterus hyalinus =

Species of fish

Coryphopterus hyalinus, the glass goby, is a species of goby found in the western Atlantic Ocean from Florida and the Bahamas to Central America and the Lesser Antilles.

== Description ==
This species reaches a length of 2.5 cm (0.98 in).
