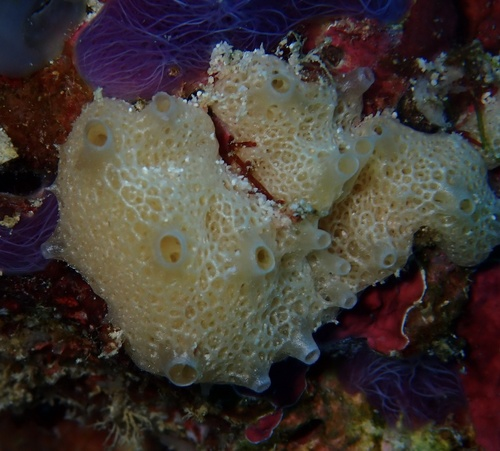

Scientific classification
- Domain: Eukaryota
- Kingdom: Animalia
- Phylum: Porifera
- Class: Calcarea
- Order: Clathrinida
- Family: Clathrinidae
- Genus: Clathrina
- Species: C. luteoculcitella

Binomial name
- Clathrina luteoculcitella Wörheide & Hooper, 1999

= Clathrina luteoculcitella =

Species of sponge

Clathrina luteoculcitella is a species of calcareous sponge from Australia. The species name means "yellow pillow" and refers to the appearance of the cormus.

== Description ==
Holotype massive yet delicate. The cormus has folds and is formed of thin, irregular and tightly anastomosed tubes. However, in the interior, tubes are loosely anastomosed. Oscula are simple apertures surrounded by a thin membrane. There are no water-collecting tubes. The skeleton comprises equiangular and equiradiate triactines and diactines. The actines of the triactines are conical, slightly undulated and sharp. Diactines are straight and one of the tips is thicker than the other one. They are found perpendicular to the surface of all tubes (not just the external tubes) and the largest tip penetrates the cormus. The mesohyl is full of bacteria.
