= Clathrina wistariensis =

Scientific classification
- Domain: Eukaryota
- Kingdom: Animalia
- Phylum: Porifera
- Class: Calcarea
- Order: Clathrinida
- Family: Clathrinidae
- Genus: Clathrina
- Species: C. wistariensis

Binomial name
- Clathrina wistariensis Wörheide & Hooper, 1999

Species of sponge

Holotype site (south of Wistari Reef)'"`UNIQ--ref-00000005-QINU`"'

Clathrina wistariensis is a species of calcareous sponge in the family Clathrinidae from Australia, off the Queensland coast.
