= Clathrina helveola =

Scientific classification
- Domain: Eukaryota
- Kingdom: Animalia
- Phylum: Porifera
- Class: Calcarea
- Order: Clathrinida
- Family: Clathrinidae
- Genus: Clathrina
- Species: C. helveola

Binomial name
- Clathrina helveola Wörheide & Hooper, 1999

Species of sponge

Clathrina helveola is a species of calcareous sponge in the family Clathrinidae from Australia, found in coastal waters off Queensland. It was first described by Gert Wörheide and John Hooper in 1999. The species name, helveola, means "pale yellow" in Latin and refers to the species' colouration.

== Description ==
The cormus in the massive holotype is delicate, formed of large, irregular and loosely anastomosed tubes. In some parts of the cormus, a thin cortex can be seen. Cells with granules are present. The skeleton has no special organization. It comprises equiangular and equiradiate triactines. Actines are conical and sharp, and slightly undulated at the tip.
