= Clathrina heronensis =

Scientific classification
- Kingdom: Animalia
- Phylum: Porifera
- Class: Calcarea
- Order: Clathrinida
- Family: Clathrinidae
- Genus: Clathrina
- Species: C. heronensis

Binomial name
- Clathrina heronensis Wörheide & Hooper, 1999

Species of sponge

Holotype site

Clathrina heronensis is a species of calcareous sponge fin the family Clathrinidae and found in the seas around Australia, and in the coastal seas of many islands to its north. It was first described by Gert Wörheide and John Hooper in 1999.

The species epithet describes it as coming from Heron Island, where the holotype was collected.

== Description ==
Large, irregular and loosely anastomosed tubes form the cormus. The spicules are very bright and can easily be seen. The mesohyl has many porocytes with brown granules. The skeleton has no special organization, comprising equiangular and equiradiate triactines. Actines are cylindrical, undulated and sharp at the tip.
