= Clathrina chrysea =

Scientific classification
- Kingdom: Animalia
- Phylum: Porifera
- Class: Calcarea
- Order: Clathrinida
- Family: Clathrinidae
- Genus: Clathrina
- Species: C. chrysea

Binomial name
- Clathrina chrysea Borojevic & Klautau, 2000

Species of sponge

Clathrina chrysea is a species of calcareous sponge from New Caledonia. The species epithet refers to the light yellow colour of the sponge.

== Description ==
Cormus formed of thin, regularly anastomosed tubes. There are no water-collecting tubes. The skeleton of the tubes has no special organisation, comprising a thin meshwork of equiangular and equiradiate triactines. Actines are straight and conical, with a sharp distal tip. They are slightly undulated at the tip. Biochemical studies separated Clathrina clathrus from another yellow clathrina earlier named as Clathrina aurea, suggesting that C. clathrus is not widespread. Based on this result, Borojevic & Klautau (2000) recognized a specimen from New Caledonia as a new species. The main difference between this and other yellow clathrinas relates to the tip of the actines of the triactines, which is sharp in C. chrysea and rounded in C. clathrus and C. aurea. The yellow colour of the cormus and the skeleton composed only of triactines with cylindrical and undulated actines suggest that these clathrinas constitute a group of closely related species. Breitfuss (1897) reported a yellow clathrina he called C. clathrus in the Indo-Pacific region (Ternate). Borojevic & Klautau (2000) commented that he was probably referring to C. chrysea. In the original description of C. chrysea, the micrometry of the triactines was 105 mm (±9 mm)/10 mm (±1 mm).
