= Clathrina parva =

Scientific classification
- Domain: Eukaryota
- Kingdom: Animalia
- Phylum: Porifera
- Class: Calcarea
- Order: Clathrinida
- Family: Clathrinidae
- Genus: Clathrina
- Species: C. parva

Binomial name
- Clathrina parva Wörheide & Hooper, 1999

Species of sponge

Clathrina parva is a species of calcareous sponge in the family Clathrinidae, found off the Queensland coast of Australia.
