= Clathrina angraensis =

Scientific classification
- Kingdom: Animalia
- Phylum: Porifera
- Class: Calcarea
- Order: Clathrinida
- Family: Clathrinidae
- Genus: Clathrina
- Species: C. angraensis

Binomial name
- Clathrina angraensis Azevedo and Klautau, 2007

Species of sponge

Clathrina angraensis is a species of calcareous sponge from Brazil. The species epithet refers to Angra dos Reis, the Portuguese name for the Botinas Islands.

== Description ==
The species has a massive cormus formed of thin, irregular and tightly anastomosed tubes, particularly in the apical region. The largest specimen collected is 33 x 24 x 8 mm. Water-collecting tubes are present. The skeleton has no special organization, comprising triactines only. Porocytes are easily observed. The triactines are equiangular and equiradiate. The actines are slightly conical, frequently undulated near the tip, and sharp.
