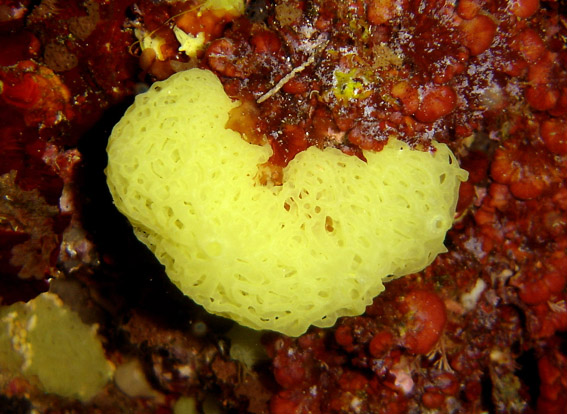
- Clathrina clathrus

Scientific classification
- Kingdom: Animalia
- Phylum: Porifera
- Class: Calcarea
- Order: Clathrinida
- Family: Clathrinidae
- Genus: Clathrina; Gray, 1867

Synonyms
- Ascetta Haeckel, 1872; Ascilla Haeckel, 1872; Guancha Miklucho-Maclay, 1868; Nardoa Schmidt, 1862 (non Gray, 1840); Proscyum Haeckel, 1870

= Clathrina =

Genus of sponges

Clathrina is a genus of calcareous sponge in the family Clathrinidae. Several species formerly in Clathrina were transferred to the newly erected genera Arturia, Ernstia, Borojevia, and Brattegardia in 2013. The name is derived from the Latin word "clathratus" meaning "latticed".

== Description ==
Species of Clathrina have a tubular organization as all species of the family Clathrinidae, with the cormus composed of anastomosed tubes. The skeleton contains spicules in the form of triactines and/or tetractines, sometimes with diactines, tripods and tetrapods as well. The choanoderm is usually flat, never forming folds when the sponge is extended.

== Species ==
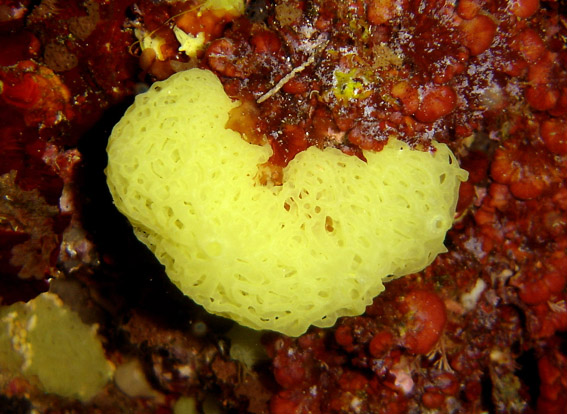
Clathrina clathrus

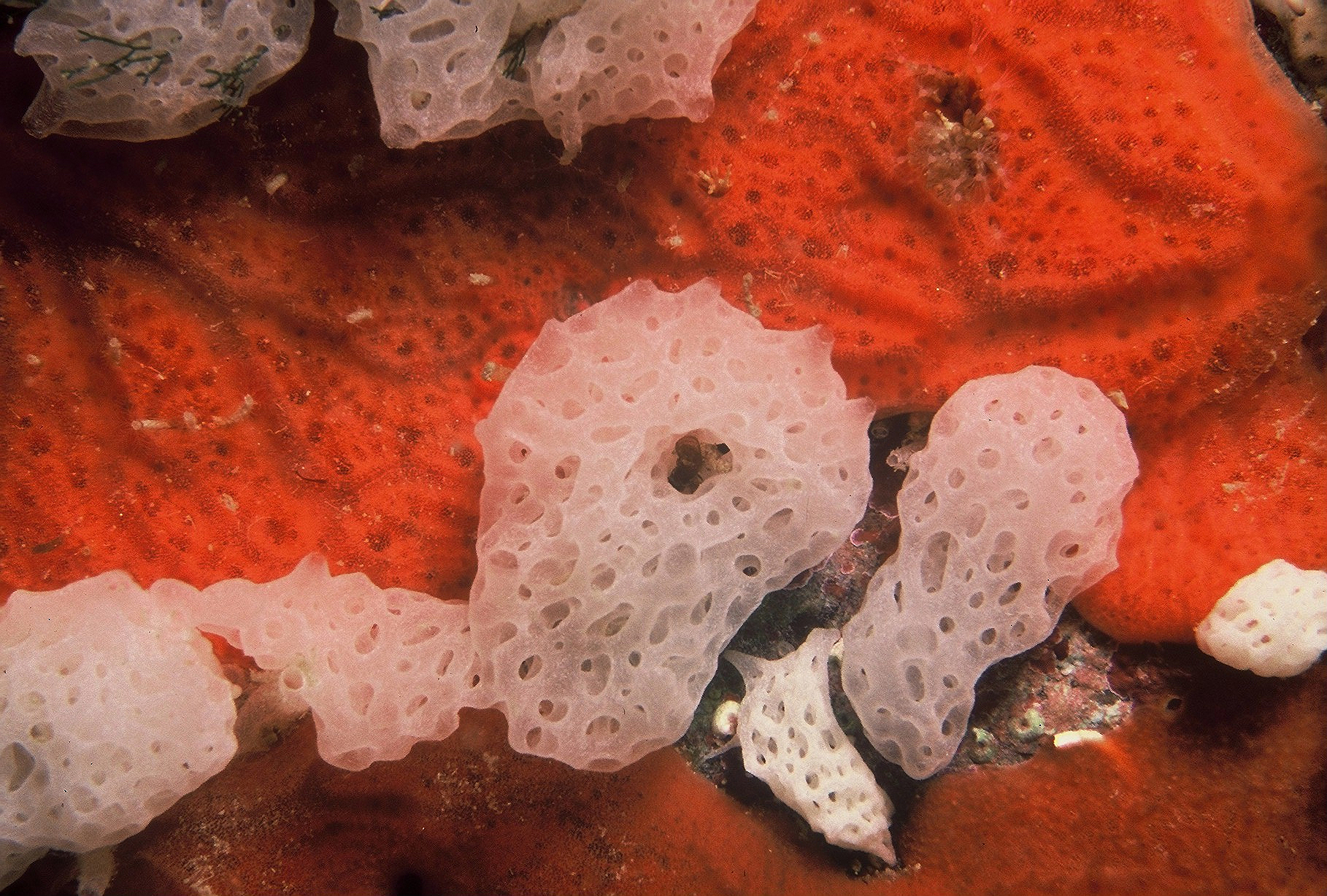
Clathrina coriacea

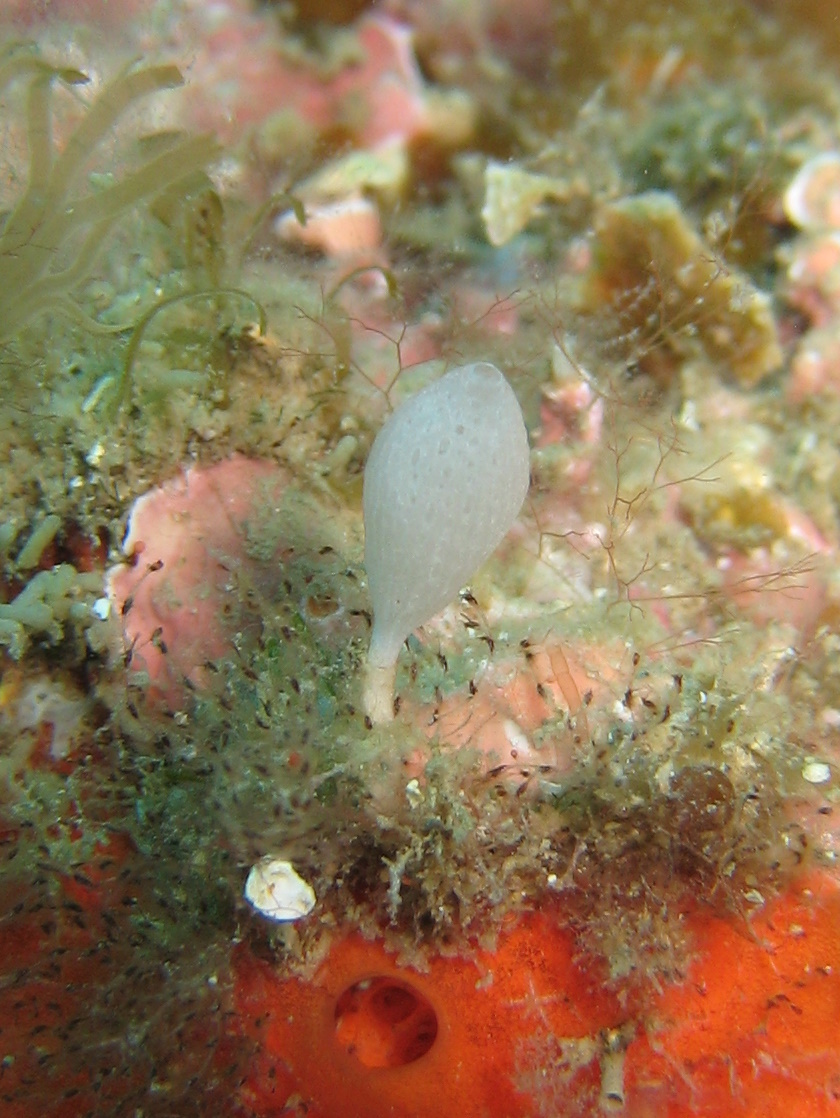
Clathrina lacunosa

There are seventy-seven species assigned to Clathrina.

- Clathrina albata Lopes, Padua, Azevedo & Klautau, 2025
- Clathrina andreusi Sim-Smith, Hickman & Kelly, 2021
- Clathrina angraensis Azevedo & Klautau, 2007
- Clathrina antofagastensis Azevedo, Hajdu, Willenz & Klautau, 2009
- Clathrina aphrodita Azevedo, Cóndor-Luján, Willenz, Hajdu, Hooker & Klautau, 2015
- Clathrina arabica (Miklucho-Maclay in Haeckel, 1872)
- Clathrina arnesenae (Rapp, 2006)
- Clathrina aurea Solé-Cava, Klautau, Boury-Esnault, Borojevic & Thorpe, 1991
- Clathrina bathybia (Poléjaeff, 1883)
- Clathrina beckingae Van Soest & De Voogd, 2015
- Clathrina blanca (Miklucho-Maclay, 1868)
- Clathrina brevicaulis (Topsent, 1936)
- Clathrina broendstedi Rapp, Janussen & Tendal, 2011
- Clathrina camura (Rapp, 2006)
- Clathrina cancellata (Verrill, 1873)
- Clathrina capixaba Lopes, Padua, Azevedo & Klautau, 2025
- Clathrina ceylonensis (Dendy, 1905)
- Clathrina chrysea Borojevic & Klautau, 2000
- Clathrina clara Klautau & Valentine, 2003
- Clathrina clathrus (Schmidt, 1864)
- Clathrina conifera Klautau & Borojevic, 2001
- Clathrina coriacea (Montagu, 1814)
- Clathrina cribrata Rapp, Klautau & Valentine, 2001
- Clathrina curacaoensis Cóndor-Luján, Louzada, Hajdu & Klautau, 2018
- Clathrina cylindractina Klautau, Solé-Cava & Borojevic, 1994
- Clathrina delicata Fontana, Cóndor-Luján, Azevedo, Pérez & Klautau, 2018
- Clathrina dictyoides (Haeckel, 1872)
- Clathrina fakaravae Klautau, Lopes, Guarabyra, Folcher, Ekins & Debitus, 2020
- Clathrina fjordica Azevedo, Hajdu, Willenz & Klautau, 2009
- Clathrina flexilis (Haeckel, 1872)
- Clathrina globulosa Cóndor-Luján, Louzada, Hajdu & Klautau, 2018
- Clathrina helveola Wörheide & Hooper, 1999
- Clathrina heronensis Wörheide & Hooper, 1999
- Clathrina hispanica Klautau & Valentine, 2003
- Clathrina hondurensis Klautau & Valentine, 2003
- Clathrina huahineae Klautau, Lopes, Guarabyra, Folcher, Ekins & Debitus, 2020
- Clathrina insularis Azevedo, Padua, Moraes, Rossi, Muricy & Klautau, 2017
- Clathrina jorunnae Rapp, 2006
- Clathrina lacunosa (Johnston, 1842)
- Clathrina laminoclathrata Carter, 1886
- Clathrina loculosa (Haeckel, 1870)
- Clathrina lutea Azevedo, Padua, Moraes, Rossi, Muricy & Klautau, 2017
- Clathrina luteoculcitella Wörheide & Hooper, 1999
- Clathrina macleayi (Lendenfeld, 1885)
- Clathrina maremeccae Van Soest & De Voogd, 2018
- Clathrina multiformis (Breitfuss, 1898)
- Clathrina mutabilis Azevedo, Padua, Moraes, Rossi, Muricy & Klautau, 2017
- Clathrina mutsu (Hôzawa, 1928)
- Clathrina nuroensis Azevedo, Cóndor-Luján, Willenz, Hajdu, Hooker & Klautau, 2015
- Clathrina osculum Carter, 1886
- Clathrina parva Wörheide & Hooper, 1999
- Clathrina pedunculata (Lendenfeld, 1885)
- Clathrina pellucida (Rapp, 2006)
- Clathrina peruana Azevedo, Cóndor-Luján, Willenz, Hajdu, Hooker & Klautau, 2015
- Clathrina philippina (Haeckel, 1872)
- Clathrina primordialis (Haeckel, 1872)
- Clathrina procumbens (Lendenfeld, 1885)
- Clathrina pulcherrima (Dendy, 1891)
- Clathrina purpurea Van Soest & De Voogd, 2015
- Clathrina ramosa (Azevedo, Hajdu, Willenz & Klautau, 2009)
- Clathrina repens Van Soest & De Voogd, 2018
- Clathrina robusta Fonseca, Cóndor-Luján & Cavalcanti, 2023
- Clathrina rodriguesensis Van Soest & De Voogd, 2018
- Clathrina rotunda Klautau & Valentine, 2003
- Clathrina rotundata Voigt, Erpenbeck & Wörheide, 2017
- Clathrina rowi Voigt, Erpenbeck & Wörheide, 2017
- Clathrina rubra Sarà, 1958
- Clathrina sceptrum (Haeckel, 1872)
- Clathrina sinusarabica Klautau & Valentine, 2003
- Clathrina smaragda Lopes, Padua, Cóndor-Luján & Klautau, 2018
- Clathrina soluta Fonseca, Cóndor-Luján & Cavalcanti, 2023
- Clathrina sororcula Van Soest & De Voogd, 2015
- Clathrina stipitata (Dendy, 1891)
- Clathrina tendali Rapp, 2015
- Clathrina williamsi Klautau, Lopes, Tavares, Rizzieri, Sorokin, Fromont, Goudie, Crowther, McCormack, George & Wahab, 2024
- Clathrina wistariensis Wörheide & Hooper, 1999
- Clathrina zelinhae Azevedo, Padua, Moraes, Rossi, Muricy & Klautau, 2017
