= Clathrina clara =

Scientific classification
- Kingdom: Animalia
- Phylum: Porifera
- Class: Calcarea
- Order: Clathrinida
- Family: Clathrinidae
- Genus: Clathrina
- Species: C. clara

Binomial name
- Clathrina clara Klautau & Valentine, 2003

Species of sponge

Clathrina clara is a species of calcareous sponge from India. The name refers to the clear, bright surface of the sponge.

== Description ==
Small, flat but not tubular and has meshes consisting of a network of thin walled tubes which are a compact mass attached directly to the substrate. The surface cormus comprises tightly-knit tubes, several tubes joining to share one common oscule, slightly raised above the surface. There are no erect free branches. Cells with granules have not been observed. The skeleton comprises two size-classes of equiangular and equiradiate triactines. Actines are conical and straight, with a sharp tip. The large triactines are situated only in the external tubes, delimiting the cormus, while the smaller triactines are found within the cormus.
