= Clathrina mutsu =

Scientific classification
- Domain: Eukaryota
- Kingdom: Animalia
- Phylum: Porifera
- Class: Calcarea
- Order: Clathrinida
- Family: Clathrinidae
- Genus: Clathrina
- Species: C. mutsu

Binomial name
- Clathrina mutsu (Hozawa, 1928)

Synonyms
- Leucosolenia mutsu Hozawa, 1928

Species of sponge

Clathrina mutsu is a species of calcareous sponge from Japan. The species is named after the type locality, Mutsu Bay

== Description ==
The sponge forms irregular, spreading masses consisting of a loose network of ascon-tubes with varying closeness of its meshes in different specimens and in different parts of the same colony. The oscula are found as small round apertures distributed here and there on the surface of the ascon-tubes. The sponge is rather small and attains the length of 0.5 – 12 mm. The diameter of ascon-tubes varies a good deal in different parts of the same colony, measuring about 0.15 - 0.6 mm. The colour of the sponge is brownish-white when preserved in alcohol. The skeleton is composed of triradiates arranged in a few confused layers in the walls of ascon-tubes. In addition to the triradiates, a few quadriradiates can occasionally be found. The triradiates are regular with straight, conical, and gradually sharp-pointed rays, measuring 60 - 150 μm in length and 8 - 14 μm thick at the base.
