= Clathrina cylindractina =

Scientific classification
- Kingdom: Animalia
- Phylum: Porifera
- Class: Calcarea
- Order: Clathrinida
- Family: Clathrinidae
- Genus: Clathrina
- Species: C. cylindractina

Binomial name
- Clathrina cylindractina Klautau, Solé-Cava & Borojevic, 1994

Species of sponge

Clathrina cylindractina is a species of calcareous sponge from Brazil. The species is named after the cylindrical-shaped actines the sponge possesses.

== Description ==
Cormus very delicate, formed of large, irregular and loosely anastomosed tubes. No water-collecting tubes are present, and oscula are present throughout all the cormus as simple openings on the tubes. The wall of the tubes is thin (25 mm). Its skeleton has no special organisation, comprising only equiangular and equiradiate triactines. Sometimes, it is possible to find a few tetractines. Actines are straight and cylindrical or slightly conical, with blunt tips. Found in cryptic habitats, such as under rocks or even on other organisms, protected against light and wave action.
