= Clathrina cribrata =

Scientific classification
- Kingdom: Animalia
- Phylum: Porifera
- Class: Calcarea
- Order: Clathrinida
- Family: Clathrinidae
- Genus: Clathrina
- Species: C. cribrata

Binomial name
- Clathrina cribrata Rapp, Klautau & Valentine, 2001

Species of sponge

Clathrina cribrata is a species of calcareous sponge in the family Clathrinidae. The holotype was collected from Kristiansund, Norway.

== Description ==
Clathrina cribrata is a massive species with its body formed from a network of large, irregular tubes. Some of these extend above the main body of the sponge as blind tubes and others are open-ended, serving as osculi. This sponge contains only one type of calcareous spicule. These are three-rayed spicules, known as triactines, and are distributed throughout the tissues in an unorganized way.
