= Clathrina hispanica =

Scientific classification
- Kingdom: Animalia
- Phylum: Porifera
- Class: Calcarea
- Order: Clathrinida
- Family: Clathrinidae
- Genus: Clathrina
- Species: C. hispanica

Binomial name
- Clathrina hispanica Klautau & Valentine, 2003

Species of sponge

Clathrina hispanica is a species of calcareous sponge from Spain. The species is named after the country of Spain, where it was discovered.

== Description ==
Cormus of the holotype formed of large, irregular and loosely anastomosed tubes. Water-collecting tubes have not been found. Cells with granules have also not been found. The skeleton has no special organization, comprising equiangular and occasionally equiradiate triactines. Actines are cylindrical, but they are slightly wider near the centre of the spicule. They are undulated at the distal part and their tip is blunt.
