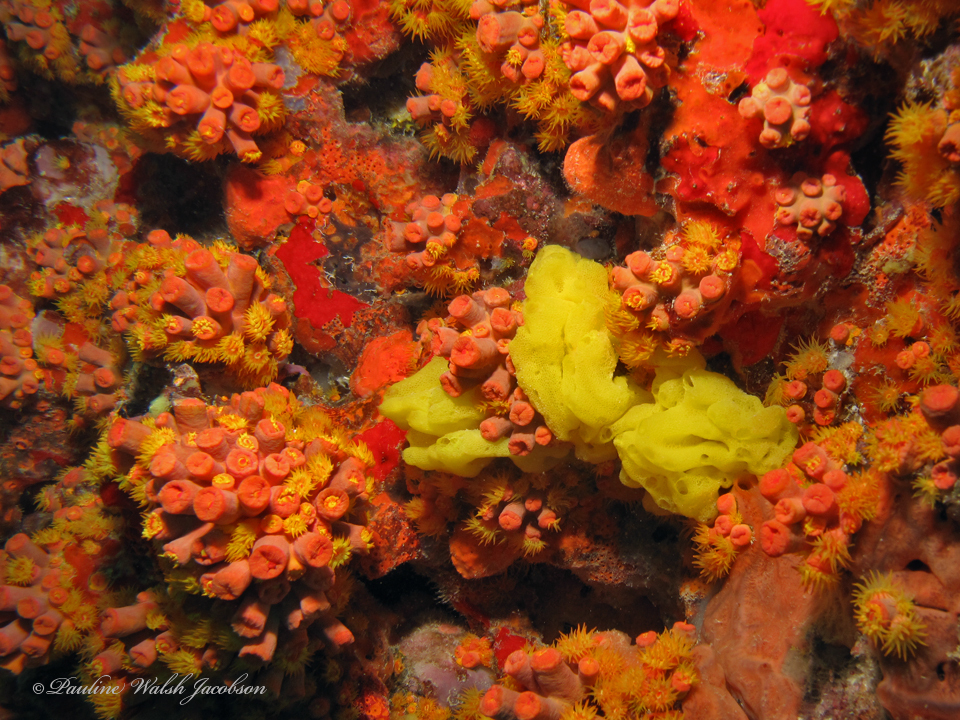

Scientific classification
- Kingdom: Animalia
- Phylum: Porifera
- Class: Calcarea
- Order: Clathrinida
- Family: Clathrinidae
- Genus: Clathrina
- Species: C. lutea

Binomial name
- Clathrina lutea Azevedo, Padua, Moraes, Rossi, Muricy & Klautau, 2017

= Clathrina lutea =

Species of sponge

Clathrina lutea is a species of calcareous sponge from Brazilian mid-shelf and oceanic island.
