= Clathrina macleayi =

Scientific classification
- Kingdom: Animalia
- Phylum: Porifera
- Class: Calcarea
- Order: Clathrinida
- Family: Clathrinidae
- Genus: Clathrina
- Species: C. macleayi

Binomial name
- Clathrina macleayi (Lendenfeld, 1885)

Synonyms
- Ascetta macleayi Lendenfeld, 1885; Ascilla gracillima Haeckel, 1872); Leucosolenia blanca var bathybia Poléjaeff, 1883; Leucosolenia macleayi (Lendenfeld, 1885); Guancha macleayi (Lendenfeld, 1885)

Species of sponge

Clathrina macleayi is a species of calcareous sponge from Australia.
