= Clathrina pellucida =

Scientific classification
- Kingdom: Animalia
- Phylum: Porifera
- Class: Calcarea
- Order: Clathrinida
- Family: Clathrinidae
- Genus: Clathrina
- Species: C. pellucida

Binomial name
- Clathrina pellucida (Rapp, 2006)

Synonyms
- Guancha pellucida Rapp, 2006

Species of sponge

Clathrina pellucida is a species of calcareous sponge from northern Atlantic. It is known from the coast of Norway and Greenland at depths between 20 and 275 m (66 and 902 ft), and from near Jan Mayen at depth of 890 m (2,920 ft).
