= Clathrina sceptrum =

Scientific classification
- Domain: Eukaryota
- Kingdom: Animalia
- Phylum: Porifera
- Class: Calcarea
- Order: Clathrinida
- Family: Clathrinidae
- Genus: Clathrina
- Species: C. sceptrum

Binomial name
- Clathrina sceptrum (Haeckel, 1872)

Synonyms
- Ascetta sceptrum Haeckel, 1872

Species of sponge

Clathrina sceptrum is a species of calcareous sponge from Canada.
