= Clathrina laminoclathrata =

Scientific classification
- Domain: Eukaryota
- Kingdom: Animalia
- Phylum: Porifera
- Class: Calcarea
- Order: Clathrinida
- Family: Clathrinidae
- Genus: Clathrina
- Species: C. laminoclathrata

Binomial name
- Clathrina laminoclathrata Carter, 1886

Species of sponge

Clathrina laminoclathrata is a species of calcareous sponge from Australia. The species name is in reference to its unusual lamina.

== Description ==
Under the tubes, directly in contact with the substrate, there is a continuous membrane, a basal lamina, and above it the anastomosed tubes characteristic of Clathrina. It is possible that this basal lamina is only an artefact created by the dried state of the specimen as Dendy (1891) supposed, but the skeleton in this region of the sponge is different from the skeleton in the tubes. The skeleton is formed by triactines only, as stated by Carter (1886) in the original description, although there are in fact three different categories of triactines, based on size. All have conical actines and sharp tips. The largest are generally found on the external tubes of the sponge, i.e. on the surface of the cormus. They can also be found in the basal lamina, although this is rare. The other two sizes of triactines are more abundant in the basal lamina, and can also be seen on the surface of the tubes, but are less abundant. There is no specialization of the tubes and the organization of the cormus is typical of Clathrina.
