= Clathrina antofagastensis =

Scientific classification
- Kingdom: Animalia
- Phylum: Porifera
- Class: Calcarea
- Order: Clathrinida
- Family: Clathrinidae
- Genus: Clathrina
- Species: C. antofagastensis

Binomial name
- Clathrina antofagastensis Azevedo, Hajdu, Willenz & Klautau, 2009

Species of sponge

Clathrina antofagastensis is a species of calcareous sponge from Chile. The species is named after Antofagasta, Chile, where the holotype was discovered.

== Description ==
Specimens are massive, the largest is 20 x 30 x 10 mm. Cormus is composed of large, irregular and tightly anastomosed tubes. Water-collecting tubes are not present. The skeleton is composed of two categories of triactines without organisation:

- Triactine I: regular (equiangular and equiradiate); actines are slightly conical to conical, straight and blunt at the tip.
- Triactine II: regular (equiangular and equiradiate) in most cases, although sagittal spicules are also present. These spicules are very small. Actines are conical, straight and blunt at the tip.
