= Clathrina hondurensis =

Scientific classification
- Kingdom: Animalia
- Phylum: Porifera
- Class: Calcarea
- Order: Clathrinida
- Family: Clathrinidae
- Genus: Clathrina
- Species: C. hondurensis

Binomial name
- Clathrina hondurensis Klautau & Valentine, 2003

Species of sponge

Clathrina hondurensis is a species of calcareous sponge from Belize. The species is named for British Honduras, the former name of Belize, at the time the holotype was collected in 1935.

== Description ==
Cormus formed of large, irregular and loosely anastomosed tubes. The diameter of the tubes is very variable, and the appearance of the cormus is reticulated. Its surface is very smooth and there are no water-collecting tubes. Cells with granules have not been observed. The skeleton has no special organization, comprising large, equiangular and equiradiate triactines. Actines are conical, straight with sharp tips.
