= Clathrina ramosa =

Scientific classification
- Kingdom: Animalia
- Phylum: Porifera
- Class: Calcarea
- Order: Clathrinida
- Family: Clathrinidae
- Genus: Clathrina
- Species: C. ramosa

Binomial name
- Clathrina ramosa Azevedo, Hajdu, Willenz and Klautau, 2009

Synonyms
- Guancha ramosa

Species of sponge

Clathrina ramosa is a species of calcareous sponge from Chile.
