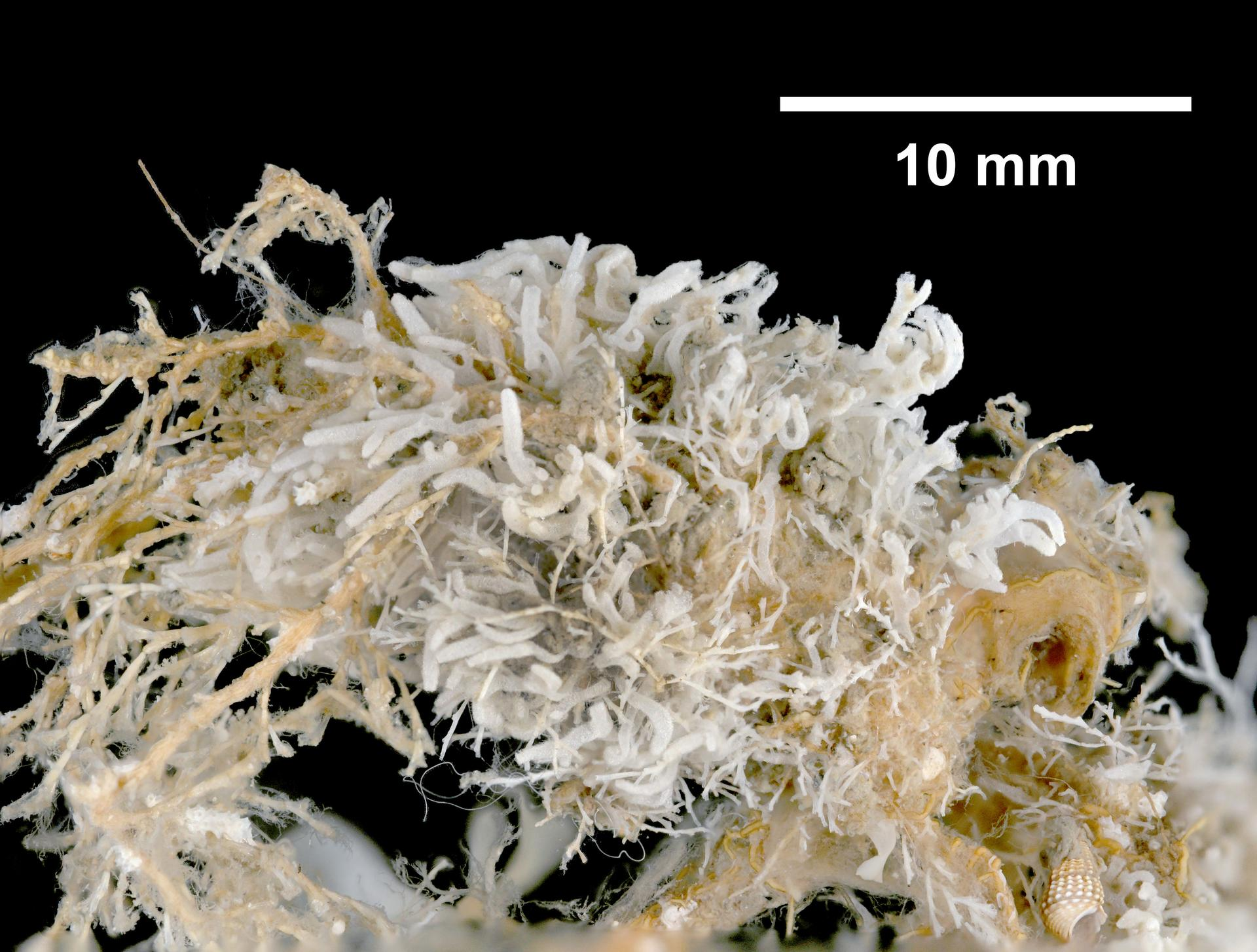

Conservation status
- Secure (NatureServe)

Scientific classification
- Kingdom: Animalia
- Phylum: Porifera
- Class: Calcarea
- Order: Clathrinida
- Family: Clathrinidae
- Genus: Clathrina
- Species: C. cancellata

Binomial name
- Clathrina cancellata (Verrill, 1873)

Synonyms
- Leucosolenia cancellata

= Clathrina cancellata =

Species of sponge

Clathrina cancellata is a species of calcareous sponge from the United States. The species name is derived from a Latin word meaning "latticed".
