= Clathrina broendstedi =

Scientific classification
- Kingdom: Animalia
- Phylum: Porifera
- Class: Calcarea
- Order: Clathrinida
- Family: Clathrinidae
- Genus: Clathrina
- Species: C. broenstedi

Binomial name
- Clathrina broenstedi Rapp, Janussen & Tendal, 2011

Species of sponge

Clathrina broenstedi is a species of calcareous sponge from the Weddell Sea. The species is named after Holger Brøndsted, a Danish sponge researcher. The only spicules present in this species are triactines.
