= Clathrina primordialis =

Scientific classification
- Domain: Eukaryota
- Kingdom: Animalia
- Phylum: Porifera
- Class: Calcarea
- Order: Clathrinida
- Family: Clathrinidae
- Genus: Clathrina
- Species: C. primordialis

Binomial name
- Clathrina primordialis (Haeckel, 1872)

Synonyms
- Ascetta primordialis Haeckel, 1872; Guancha primordialis (Haeckel, 1872); Leucetta primordialis (Haeckel, 1872); Leucosolenia primordialis (Haeckel, 1872)

Species of sponge

Clathrina primordialis is a species of calcareous sponge from Croatia.
