= Clathrina multiformis =

Scientific classification
- Domain: Eukaryota
- Kingdom: Animalia
- Phylum: Porifera
- Class: Calcarea
- Order: Clathrinida
- Family: Clathrinidae
- Genus: Clathrina
- Species: C. multiformis

Binomial name
- Clathrina multiformis (Breitfuss, 1898)

Synonyms
- Leucosolenia multiformis Breitfuss, 1898

Species of sponge

Clathrina multiformis is a species of calcareous sponge from Russia.
