= Clathrina arabica =

Scientific classification
- Domain: Eukaryota
- Kingdom: Animalia
- Phylum: Porifera
- Class: Calcarea
- Order: Clathrinida
- Family: Clathrinidae
- Genus: Clathrina
- Species: C. arabica

Binomial name
- Clathrina arabica (Miklucho-Maclay in Haeckel, 1872)

Synonyms
- Nardoa arabica Miklucho-Maclay in Haeckel, 1872; Guancha arabica Miklucho-Maclay in Haeckel, 1872

Species of sponge

Clathrina arabica is a species of calcareous sponge from Oman.
