= Clathrina dictyoides =

Scientific classification
- Domain: Eukaryota
- Kingdom: Animalia
- Phylum: Porifera
- Class: Calcarea
- Order: Clathrinida
- Family: Clathrinidae
- Genus: Clathrina
- Species: C. dictyoides

Binomial name
- Clathrina dictyoides (Haeckel, 1872)

Synonyms
- Ascetta dictyoides Haeckel, 1872

Species of sponge

Clathrina dictyoides is a species of calcareous sponge from Australia. This species is considered to be dubious because the type, and only known specimen, is lost.
