= Clathrina aurea =

Scientific classification
- Kingdom: Animalia
- Phylum: Porifera
- Class: Calcarea
- Order: Clathrinida
- Family: Clathrinidae
- Genus: Clathrina
- Species: C. aurea

Binomial name
- Clathrina aurea Solé-Cava, Klautau, Boury-Esnault, Borojevic and Thorpe, 1991

Species of sponge

Clathrina aurea is a species of calcareous sponge from Brazil. Specimens of this species were previously misidentified with Clathrina clathrus

== Description ==
Cormus formed of large, irregular and loosely anastomosed tubes with many oscula. Water-collecting tubes are absent. Living specimens have a yellow cormus, which becomes white after preservation in ethanol. The skeleton has no special organisation and it is composed of only equiangular and equiradiate triactines. Actines are cylindrical and slightly undulated near the tip, which is rounded.
