= Clathrina jorunnae =

Scientific classification
- Kingdom: Animalia
- Phylum: Porifera
- Class: Calcarea
- Order: Clathrinida
- Family: Clathrinidae
- Genus: Clathrina
- Species: C. jorunnae

Binomial name
- Clathrina jorunnae Rapp, 2006
- Clathrina jorunnae is only known from Trondheimsfjord in Norway

Species of sponge

Clathrina jorunnae is a species of calcareous sponge from Norway. It is only known from Trondheimsfjord, its type locality, where it was dredged from depths of 25–250 m (82–820 ft). The specimen was attached to a bryozoan of the genus Reteporella. The species is named after Jorunn Berg, Hans Tore Rapp's grandmother, who introduced Rapp to marine animals.

== Description ==
Cormus is composed of very thin and highly irregularly and loosely anastomosing tubes. No oscula are visible on the surface. Water-collecting tubes are absent. Colour is light beige when alive and white in alcohol. The surface of the tubes minutely hispid due to single actines of the triactines irregularly protruding through the outer surface. The texture is fragile but compressible. Cormus measures 8 mm in diameter. Skeleton is composed of one group of equiangular and equiradiate triactines. The actines are straight, conical, and sharply pointed.
