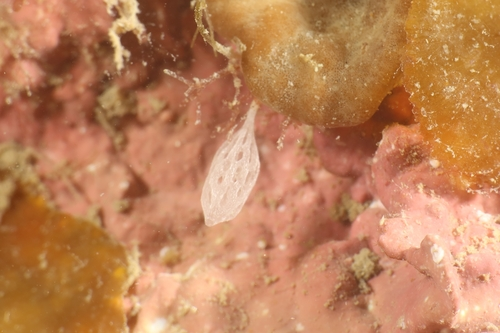

Scientific classification
- Domain: Eukaryota
- Kingdom: Animalia
- Phylum: Porifera
- Class: Calcarea
- Order: Clathrinida
- Family: Clathrinidae
- Genus: Clathrina
- Species: C. blanca

Binomial name
- Clathrina blanca (Miklucho-Maclay), 1868

Synonyms
- Guancha blanca Miklucho-Maclay, 1868

= Clathrina blanca =

Species of sponge

Clathrina blanca is a species of Calcareous sponge in the genus Clathrina.

It was discovered in 1867 and published in 1868 by Nicholas Miklouho-Maclay, on an expedition to the Canary Islands with Ernst Haeckel. Miklouho-Maclay classified it as Guancha blanca; the species name refers to its "lustrous white color", and the Guanches were indigenous people of the Canaries. Haeckel soon after recategorized it into seven different genera, including Ascetta blanca. Multiple rediscoveries in different locations with different names followed, including Ascetta macleayi from Australia (Von Lendenfeld 1885), and Leucosolenia stipitata from Victoria (Dendy 1891). It has also been observed in California, and since 1937 it has been classified as Clathrina blanca.
