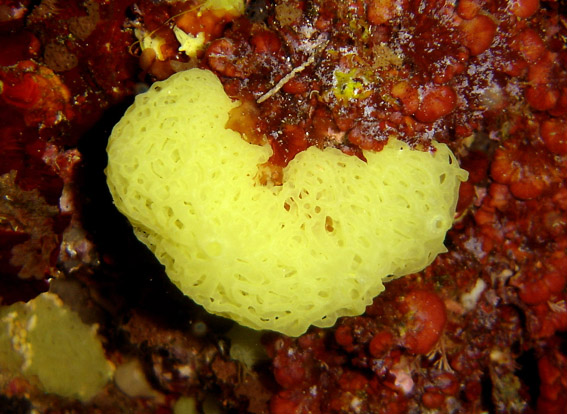
- Clathrina rotunda in Croatia

Scientific classification
- Kingdom: Animalia
- Phylum: Porifera
- Class: Calcarea
- Order: Clathrinida
- Family: Clathrinidae
- Genus: Clathrina
- Species: C. rotunda

Binomial name
- Clathrina rotunda Klautau & Valentine, 2003

= Clathrina rotunda =

Species of sponge

Clathrina rotunda is a species of calcareous sponge from South Africa.
