= Clathrina camura =

Scientific classification
- Kingdom: Animalia
- Phylum: Porifera
- Class: Calcarea
- Order: Clathrinida
- Family: Clathrinidae
- Genus: Clathrina
- Species: C. camura

Binomial name
- Clathrina camura (Rapp, 2006)

Synonyms
- Guancha camura Rapp, 2006

Species of sponge

Clathrina camura is a species of calcareous sponge from the Atlantic Ocean.

Clathrina camura is known from the coastal waters of northern Norway and Greenland from depths between 27 and 200 m (89 and 656 ft).
