= Clathrina procumbens =

Scientific classification
- Kingdom: Animalia
- Phylum: Porifera
- Class: Calcarea
- Order: Clathrinida
- Family: Clathrinidae
- Genus: Clathrina
- Species: C. procumbens

Binomial name
- Clathrina procumbens (von Lendenfeld, 1885)

Synonyms
- Ascaltis procumbens (von Lendenfeld, 1885)

Species of sponge

Clathrina procumbens is a species of calcareous sponge from Australia.
