= Clathrina pedunculata =

Scientific classification
- Kingdom: Animalia
- Phylum: Porifera
- Class: Calcarea
- Order: Clathrinida
- Family: Clathrinidae
- Genus: Clathrina
- Species: C. pedunculata

Binomial name
- Clathrina pedunculata (Lendenfeld, 1885)

Synonyms
- Ascetta pedunculata (Lendenfeld, 1885); Leucopsis pedunculata Lendenfeld, 1885; Guancha pedunculata (Lendenfeld, 1885)

Species of sponge

Clathrina pedunculata is a species of calcareous sponges from Australia.
