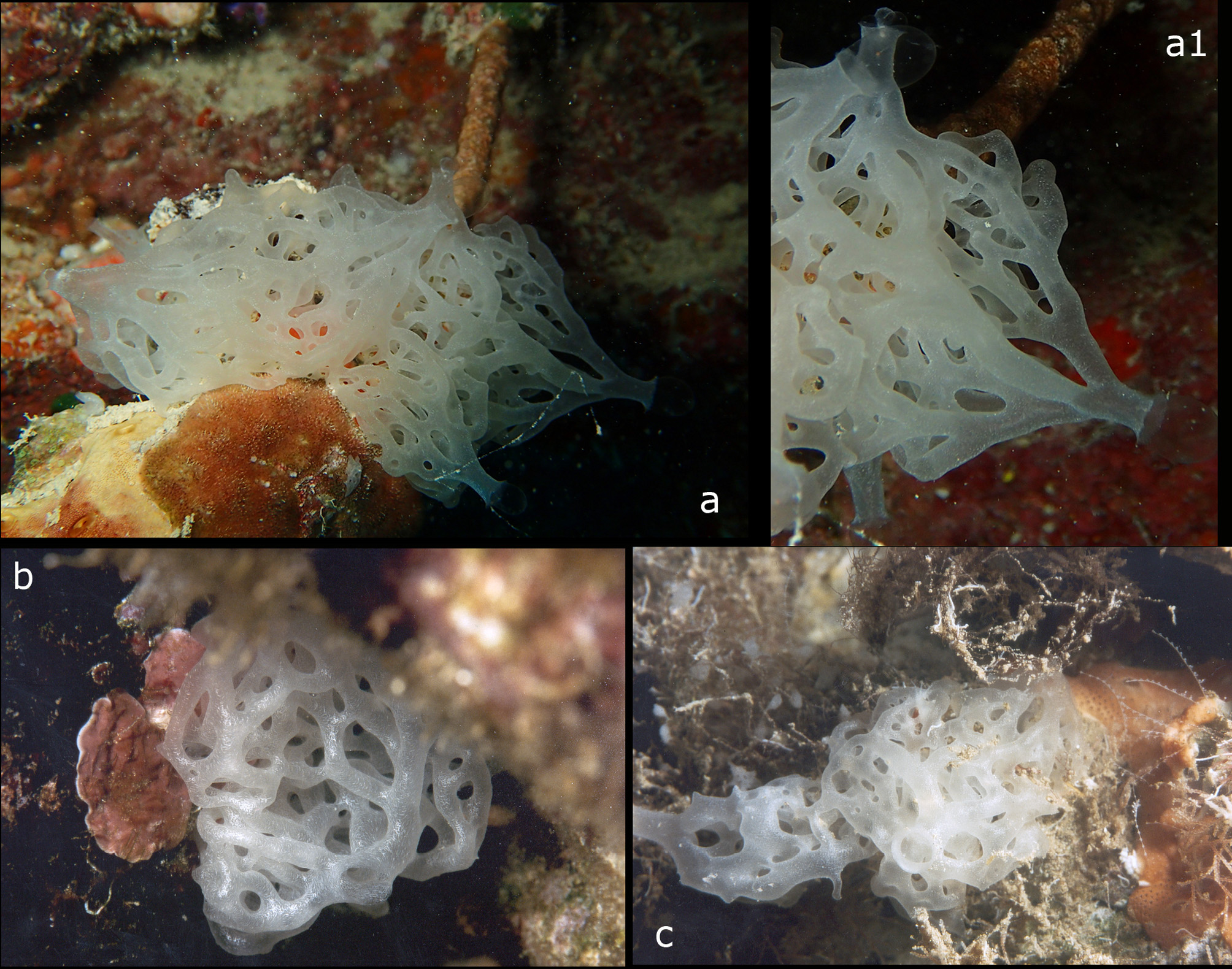

Scientific classification
- Kingdom: Animalia
- Phylum: Porifera
- Class: Calcarea
- Order: Clathrinida
- Family: Clathrinidae
- Genus: Clathrina
- Species: C. sinusarabica

Binomial name
- Clathrina sinusarabica Klautau & Valentine, 2003

= Clathrina sinusarabica =

Species of sponge

Clathrina sinusarabica is a species of calcareous sponge from Egypt.
