= Clathrina fjordica =

Scientific classification
- Kingdom: Animalia
- Phylum: Porifera
- Class: Calcarea
- Order: Clathrinida
- Family: Clathrinidae
- Genus: Clathrina
- Species: C. fjordica

Binomial name
- Clathrina fjordica Azevedo, Hajdu, Willenz & Klautau, 2009

Species of sponge

Clathrina fjordica is a species of calcareous sponge from Chile. The species is named after Comau Fjord, the type locality.

== Description ==
Cormus fragile, the holotype is 60 x 45 x 7 mm. It is composed of large, irregular and loosely anastomosed tubes. Water-collecting tubes are present. The skeleton has no special organisation, and it is composed of only one category of triactine varying from cylindrical to conical actines.
