= Clathrina conifera =

Scientific classification
- Kingdom: Animalia
- Phylum: Porifera
- Class: Calcarea
- Order: Clathrinida
- Family: Clathrinidae
- Genus: Clathrina
- Species: C. conifera

Binomial name
- Clathrina conifera Klautau & Borojevic, 2001

Species of sponge

Clathrina conifera is a species of calcareous sponge from Brazil. The species name refers to the cone-shaped appearance of the triactines.

== Description ==
Cormus formed of large, irregular and loosely anastomosed tubes, white in life and beige when preserved. Water-collecting tubes are absent. The skeleton is composed only of triactines without any special organisation. They are equiradiate and equiangular. Actines are conical and straight with blunt tips.
