= Clathrina pulcherrima =

Scientific classification
- Kingdom: Animalia
- Phylum: Porifera
- Class: Calcarea
- Order: Clathrinida
- Family: Clathrinidae
- Genus: Clathrina
- Species: C. pulcherrima

Binomial name
- Clathrina pulcherrima (Dendy, 1891)

Synonyms
- Clathrina blanca var. pulcherrima (Dendy, 1891); Guancha blanca var. pulcherrima (Dendy, 1891); Leucosolenia blanca var pulcherrima Dendy, 1891; Leucosolenia pulcherrima (Dendy, 1891); Guancha pulcherrima (Dendy, 1891)

Species of sponge

Clathrina pulcherrima is a species of calcareous sponge from Australia. It was described by Arthur Dendy in 1891.
