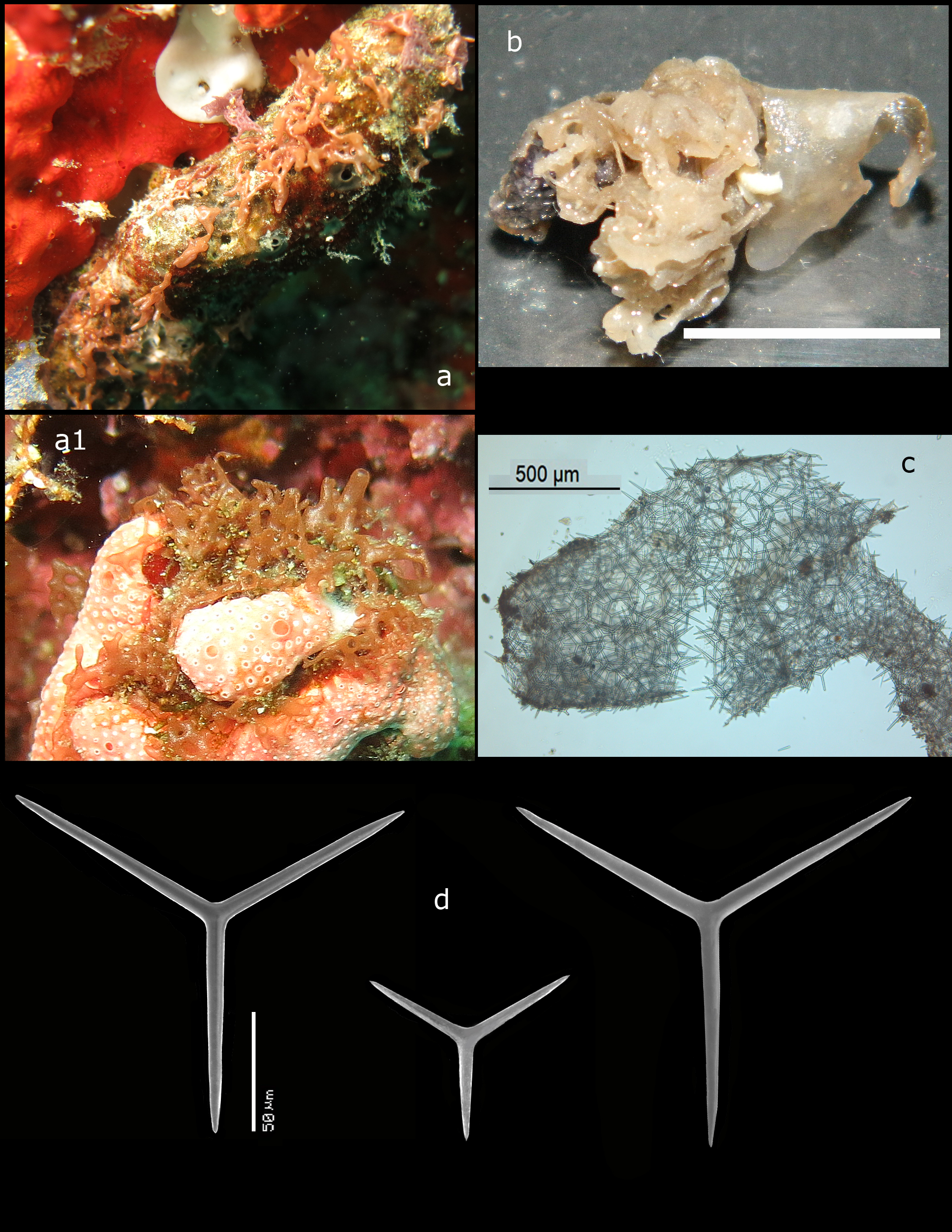

Scientific classification
- Kingdom: Animalia
- Phylum: Porifera
- Class: Calcarea
- Order: Clathrinida
- Family: Clathrinidae
- Genus: Clathrina
- Species: C. repens

Binomial name
- Clathrina repens Van Soest & De Voogd, 2018

= Clathrina repens =

Species of sponge

Clathrina repens is a species of calcareous sponge from the Western Indian Ocean and Red Sea.
