= Clathrina philippina =

Scientific classification
- Kingdom: Animalia
- Phylum: Porifera
- Class: Calcarea
- Order: Clathrinida
- Family: Clathrinidae
- Genus: Clathrina
- Species: C. philippina

Binomial name
- Clathrina philippina (Haeckel, 1872)

Synonyms
- Ascetta philippina Haeckel, 1872; Guancha philippina (Haeckel, 1872)

Species of sponge

Clathrina philippina is a species of calcareous sponges from the Philippines.
