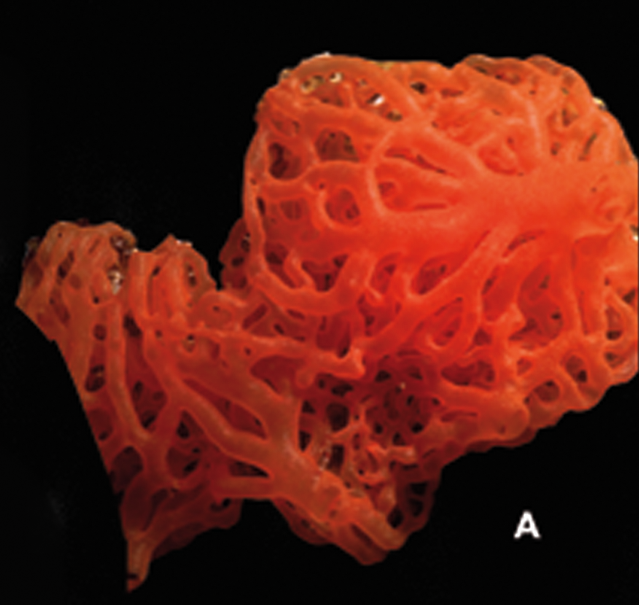

Scientific classification
- Domain: Eukaryota
- Kingdom: Animalia
- Phylum: Porifera
- Class: Calcarea
- Order: Clathrinida
- Family: Clathrinidae
- Genus: Clathrina
- Species: C. rubra

Binomial name
- Clathrina rubra Sarà, 1958

= Clathrina rubra =

Species of sponge

Clathrina rubra is a species of calcareous sponge from France.
