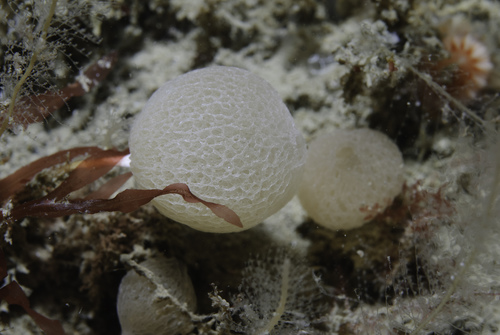

Scientific classification
- Domain: Eukaryota
- Kingdom: Animalia
- Phylum: Porifera
- Class: Calcarea
- Order: Clathrinida
- Family: Clathrinidae
- Genus: Clathrina
- Species: C. lacunosa

Binomial name
- Clathrina lacunosa (Johnston, 1842)

Synonyms
- Guancha lacunosa (Johnston, 1842)

= Clathrina lacunosa =

Species of sponge

Clathrina lacunosa is a species of calcareous sponge from the British Isles. The species name means "having holes" and refers to the perforations found in the sides of the sponge. It is usually found on vertical solid surfaces at depths down to 220 m. It is distributed in the north-eastern Atlantic from the Arctic to the Mediterranean. It is a fairly common sponge but is often overlooked due to its small size.

== Description ==
This is a distinctive sponge, globular on a long thin stem, resembling a tiny balloon on a string. It reaches a maximum length of 3 cm and is often much smaller than this. There is an osculum at the apex of the sponge. Sponge composed of an ovoid body of thin, tightly and regularly anastomosing tubes, and a solid peduncle without any choanoderm. Water-collecting tubes converge into one apical osculum. Colour white in ethanol and light beige when dried. Triactines from the clathroid body range from almost regular to parasagittal with straight actines. Close to the peduncle there are parasagittal spicules with the longest unpaired actine pointing towards the peduncle. The skeleton of the peduncle is composed of large diactines with a break on the middle, and parasagittal triactines with a very long unpaired actine and short paired actines. Irregular diactines of variable sizes are present at low numbers in the peduncle. All actines are cylindrical with slightly blunt to sharp points.
