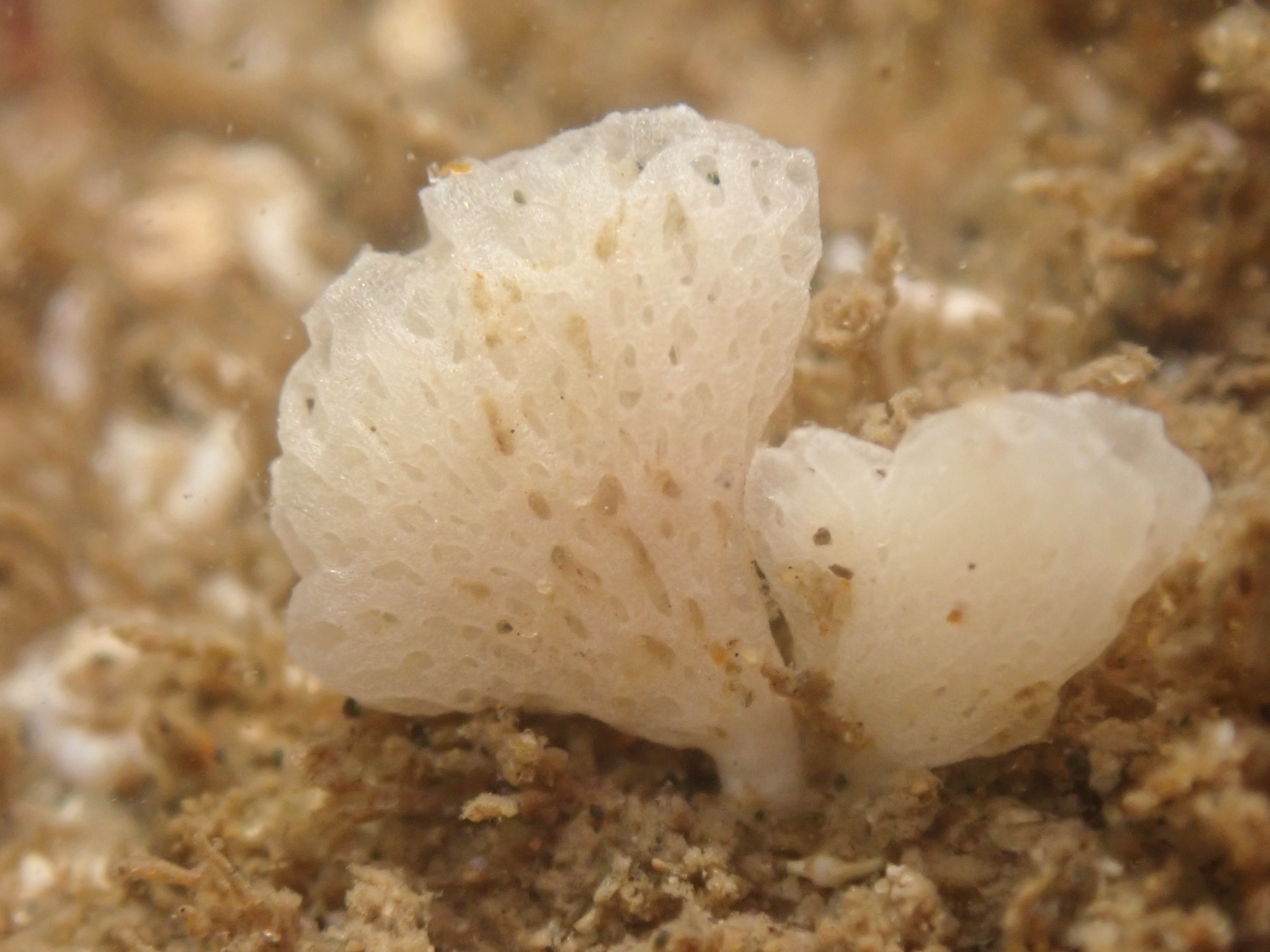

Scientific classification
- Kingdom: Animalia
- Phylum: Porifera
- Class: Calcarea
- Order: Clathrinida
- Family: Clathrinidae
- Genus: Ascilla; Haeckel, 1872
- Species: A. gracilis

Binomial name
- Ascilla gracilis Haeckel, 1872

Synonyms
- Ascilla convallaria (Haeckel, 1872); Ernstia gracilis (Haeckel, 1872); Guancha gracilis (Haeckel, 1872); Leucosolenia convallaria (Haeckel, 1872); Leucosolenia gracilis (Haeckel, 1872)

= Ascilla =

Genus of sponges

Ascilla is a genus of calcareous sponges in the family Clathrinidae. It is monotypic, being represented by the single species Ascilla gracilis found in northern California.
