= Clathrina sulphurea =

Clathrina sulphurea is an unaccepted scientific name and may refer to three species of calcareous sponge:

- Arturia canariensis, found in the Canary Islands, Cape Verde, the Adriatic Sea and the Caribbean Sea
- Clathrina clathrus, found in the Mediterranean and on Atlantic coasts of Europe
- Clathrina coriacea, found along the eastern Atlantic coasts
