= Brattegardia =

Brattegardia nanseni

Scientific classification
- Kingdom: Animalia
- Phylum: Porifera
- Class: Calcarea
- Order: Clathrinida
- Family: Clathrinidae
- Genus: Brattegardia; Klautau, Azevedo, Cóndor-Luján, Rapp, Collins & Russo, 2013
- Species: B. nanseni

Binomial name
- Brattegardia nanseni (Breitfuss, 1896)

Synonyms
- Leucosolenia nanseni Breitfuss, 1896; Clathrina nanseni (Breitfuss, 1896)

Genus of sponges

Brattegardia is a monotypic genus of calcareous sponge with a single species: Brattegardia nanseni from Norway. The genus is named after the Norwegian marine biologist Torleiv Brattegard. The species is named after Norwegian helminthologist Fridtjof Nansen.

== Description ==
Calcinea in which the cormus is formed by anastomosed tubes covered by a thin membranous layer, at least in young specimens. Cormus is massive/globular with or without a stalk. The skeleton contains regular (equiangular and equiradiant) triactines and tetractines, but parasagittal triactines may be present. Triactines are the most numerous spicules. Aquiferous system asconoid.

== See also ==
- Sponge
