= C. rubra =

C. rubra may refer to:

- Canna rubra, a garden plant
- Cephalanthera rubra, the red helleborine, an orchid species found in Europe, north Africa and parts of Asia
- Chionochloa rubra, the red tussock, a plant species endemic to New Zealand
- Clathrina rubra, a sponge species
- Claytonia rubra, the redstem springbeauty, a wildflower species
- Crax rubra, the great curassow, a large black pheasant-like bird species
