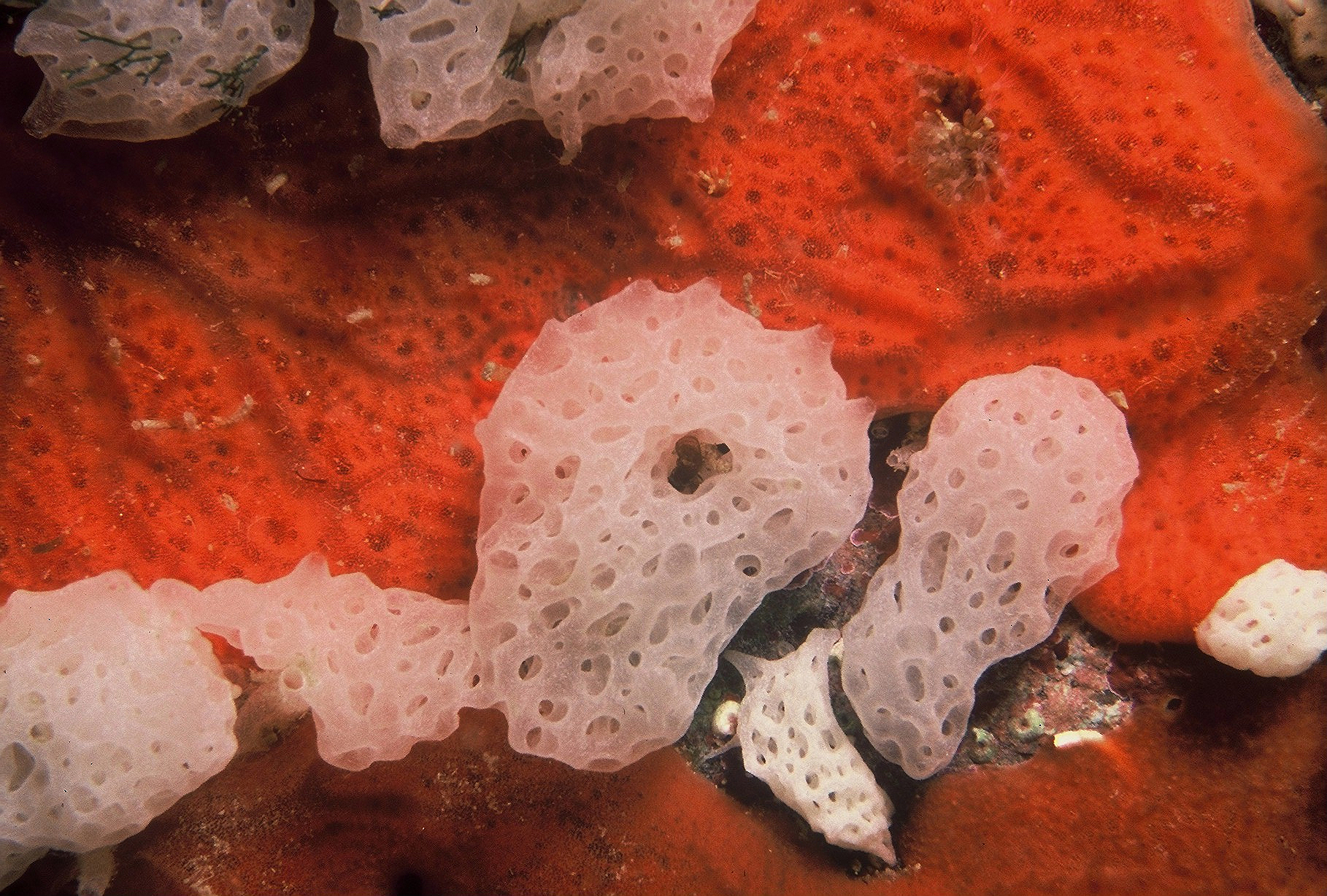

Conservation status
- Secure (NatureServe)

Scientific classification
- Kingdom: Animalia
- Phylum: Porifera
- Class: Calcarea
- Order: Clathrinida
- Family: Clathrinidae
- Genus: Clathrina
- Species: C. coriacea

Binomial name
- Clathrina coriacea (Montagu, 1814)

Synonyms
- Ascetta coriacea (Montagu, 1814); Ascetta membranacea Haeckel, 1872; Clathrina sulphurea Carter, 1872; Grantia coriacea (Montagu, 1814); Grantia himantia (Haeckel, 1869); Grantia multicavata Bean, 1842; Leucosolenia coriacea (Montagu, 1814); Leucosolenia himantia Haeckel, 1869; Spongia coriacea Montagu, 1814

= Clathrina coriacea =

Species of sponge

Clathrina coriacea is a species of calcareous sponge belonging to the class Calcarea and family Clathrinidae. Species in the genus Clathrina are composed of calcium carbonate tube-like skeletons containing spicules. The sponge can be located in shallow waters widely distributed along North Atlantic coasts, as well as on other coasts.

== Anatomy ==
This three-dimensional calcareous sponge species occurs as flat white or yellow encrustations and can also be found with grey, pale rose or orange colors. The sponge ranges from 1 cm to 3 cm in diameter with a central osculum and close inspection reveals a tightly-knit latticework of tubes. The calcareous spicules are all of a similar shape, three-rayed triactines. The equiangular triradiate spicules have spicule ray junctions that are planar with large dimensions. The tight tubes form a delicate common oscule and the skeleton is made of the calcareous spicules. At younger ages the species are thin and when mature they are soft with tight tubes.

== Habitat ==
=== Environment ===
This is largely a shallow-water species though it has been recorded at depths of up to 650 m. The substrate is often rock but this sponge is also common on kelp holdfasts and on other sponge species. The sponge is normally found with Dendrodoa grossularia in caves and canyons, but can also be located on the shore on rocks. Additionally, the sponge can be found in dense amounts with Dendrodoa in gullies and tunnels encountering wave-surges. This calcareous sponge species can also be found in mud banks.

=== Distribution ===
This species is found along east Atlantic coasts from as far North as the Arctic and down south near South Africa, but is mostly well-defined in the North Atlantic and on the coasts of the British Isles. This species has been found in the Lingurian Sea with purple spots around the sponge. It was determined that these purple spots on the sponge was a web of hyphae of a fungus that causes these spots to appear.

== Behavior ==
=== Reproduction ===
The reproduction time period of Clathrina coriacea is from the summer and fall months of July to October. This sponge species can undergo both asexual and sexual reproduction and is also known to be a hermaphrodite. This species of sponge undergoes fragmentation in the summer and reproduction is influenced by environmental factors including temperature. Oogenesis is common in this sponge species and they have a total cleavage which allows the species to form blastula larva that has one posterior granular cell. Once in the parent, the larva blastomeres will migrate into the blastocoel. In order for this calcareous sponge species to reproduce, there is a required minimum size for the adult. Buds on the external side of the sponge have been previously identified before.

=== Feeding ===
The Clathrina coriacea are omnivores and feed on several Chaetoceros species. Calcareous sponges are filter feeders that can filter out heterotrophic bacteria in large amounts of water and feed on picoplankton (< 2μm). These sponges are significant in the process of cycling food particles throughout the water column and rocky habitats. They have numerous predators including the Red Reef Hermit Crab and several shrimp species such as the Sand Snapping Shrimp and Dotted Pistol Shrimp.

=== Locomotion ===
The Clathrina coriacea has been observed contracting and changing shape to move. In general, locomotion in sponges occurs in outward movements as the sponge moves its spicules. This species of sponge does not have a radial center, so the locomotion and contracting of the sponge is much slower than other species such as Leucosolenia botryoides.
