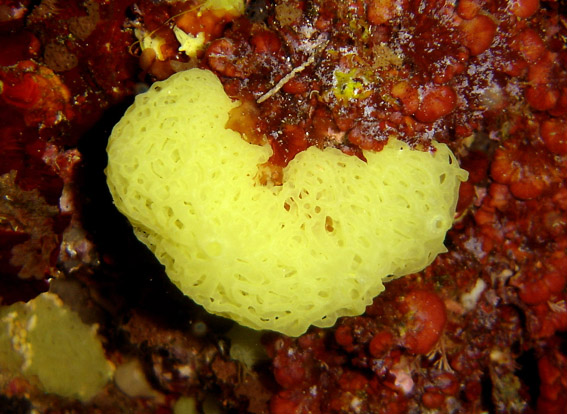

Scientific classification
- Domain: Eukaryota
- Kingdom: Animalia
- Phylum: Porifera
- Class: Calcarea
- Order: Clathrinida
- Family: Clathrinidae
- Genus: Clathrina
- Species: C. clathrus

Binomial name
- Clathrina clathrus (Schmidt, 1864)

Synonyms
- Ascetta clathrina Haeckel, 1872; Ascetta clathrus (Schmidt, 1864); Ascetta maeandrina Haeckel, 1872; Ascetta mirabilis Haeckel, 1872; Clathrina sulphurea Gray, 1867; Grantia clathrus Schmidt, 1864; Leucosolenia clathrus (Schmidt, 1864); Nardoa labyrinthus Schmid, 1872

= Clathrina clathrus =

Species of sponge

Clathrina clathrus is a species of calcareous sponge belonging to the family Clathrinidae.

This yellow (occasionally white) sponge, up to 10 cm in diameter, usually appears cushion-shaped at a distance (its close relative Clathrina coriacea is normally flatter in appearance). Close-up the sponge can be seen to consist of a tangled mass of tubes (these tubes are thicker and less tightly knit than in C. coriacea and there is no osculum as found in that species). Like C. coriacea, the spicules are exclusively three-pointed triactines.

This is a shallow-water species found in the Mediterranean and on Atlantic coasts of Europe as far north as the British Isles.
