= Cormus =

Differentiated body of a plant

Cormus (pl: cormi) (from ancient Greek: κορμός, kormόs, 'stem') is the appearance of a plant that belong to Cormophyte (Pteridophyte and Spermatophyte). In cormus, the vegetative apparatus is no longer a thallus, such as algae, that cannot be distinctly differentiated. The structure of cormus can be easily differentiated into its roots, stems, and leaves.

In the sense of Ernst Haeckel, cormus is a plant or "colonia" animal made up of a number of individuals which originate by gemmation or budding. As applied to animals, cormus is equivalent to polypidom.

== See also ==
- Thallophyte
