= Gert Wörheide =

German evolutionary geobiologist

- Education: Free University of Berlin (Diploma, 1994); University of Göttingen (PhD, 1998)
- Known for: Sponge phylogenomics; deep metazoan phylogeny; biomineralization; Sponge and Placozoa genomics
- Awards: Academia Europaea (2019); Leibniz-Sozietät der Wissenschaften zu Berlin (2024)
- Scientific career
- Fields: Geobiology, molecular phylogenetics, evolutionary biology, marine genomics
- Workplaces: Ludwig-Maximilians-Universität München; Bavarian State Collections of Palaeontology and Geology
- Doctoral advisor: Joachim Reitner
- Other academic advisors: Gundolf Ernst
- Website: www.geobiology.eu

Gert Wörheide is a German marine biologist and geobiologist, and Professor (Chair, W3) of Paleontology and Geobiology at Ludwig-Maximilians-Universität München (LMU Munich), a position he has held since 2008. He is also Research Director of the Bavarian State Collections of Palaeontology and Geology (BSPG-SNSB) in Munich. His research centres on the molecular phylogeny and comparative genomics of early-diverging animals, particularly sponges and Placozoa, the evolutionary origins of biomineralization in sponges and corals, and the application of phylogenomics to deep metazoan relationships. He is best known for providing phylogenomic evidence that sponges represent the sister group to all other animals, for uncovering an ancient role of carbonic anhydrase in skeletal formation, and for building international research infrastructure in comparative invertebrate genomics. He is a member of Academia Europaea and an ordinary member of the Leibniz-Sozietät der Wissenschaften zu Berlin.

== Education and early career ==
Wörheide studied Geology with a major in Paleontology at the Free University of Berlin, completing his Diploma thesis under the supervision of Prof. Dr. Gundolf Ernst in 1994. He subsequently undertook doctoral research at the University of Göttingen, earning his Dr. rer. nat. in Geobiology in 1998, supervised by Prof. Dr. Joachim Reitner. His dissertation was recognised with the Prize of the Faculty of Geosciences of the University of Göttingen for outstanding examination results.

From 1998 to 2000, Wörheide held two DAAD-funded postdoctoral fellowships. He was a Postdoctoral Fellow at the Queensland Museum, working with Dr. John Hooper, and The University of Queensland, working with Professor Bernard Degnan in Brisbane, Australia, from 1998 to 2002, and has since held the position of Honorary Research Fellow at the Queensland Museum.

In 2002, Wörheide was appointed Junior Professor for Molecular Geobiology at the Geoscience Center of the University of Göttingen. In 2007, he co-founded the Courant Research Center Geobiology at the University of Göttingen and co-chaired an international workshop on the emergence and evolution of uni- and multicellular life at the Göttingen Academy of Sciences and Humanities.

== Academic career ==
=== LMU Munich ===
In 2008, Wörheide was appointed Professor (W3) of Paleontology and Geobiology at LMU Munich. He has served as Speaker of the Executive Board of the GeoBio-CenterLMU since 2008. He served as Director of the Bavarian State Collections of Palaeontology and Geology and Palaeontological Museum Munich (BSPG) from 2008 to 2025, as Deputy General Director of the Bavarian Natural History Collections (SNSB) from 2022 to 2025, and has been Research Director of the BSPG-SNSB since 2025.

Within LMU Munich, Wörheide served as Dean of the Faculty of Geosciences in two terms (2011–2013 and 2017–2019) and as Vice-Dean (2013–2017 and 2019–2021). He was a Member of the LMU Senate from 2024 to 2025 and has served as Ombudsperson of the Faculty of Geosciences since 2026. In 2013, he initiated the international English-language Master's degree programme in Geobiology and Paleobiology (120 ECTS) at LMU Munich, which received EVALAG accreditation in 2014 and reaccreditation in 2021.

=== Editorial and society roles ===
Wörheide has served as Editor-in-Chief of the palaeontological journal Zitteliana since 2008, as Section Editor for "Phylogeny & Phylogeography" at BMC Evolutionary Biology from 2009 to 2021, as Subject Editor for Porifera at Zootaxa from 2005 to 2013, and as Editorial Board Member of Palaeoworld from 2013 to 2017. He has been a member of the IUCN Species Survival Commission since 2017 and has chaired the European Chapter of the International Society for Reef Studies (ICRS) since 2019.

=== International research coordination ===
In 2006, Wörheide founded the International Sponge Barcoding Project, a global initiative to build a reference library of DNA barcodes for sponge species. From 2018 to 2022, he coordinated IGNITE (Comparative Genomics of Non-Model Invertebrates), a Marie Skłodowska-Curie Innovative Training Network (ITN) funded under EU Horizon 2020, which trained doctoral researchers across European institutions in comparative invertebrate genomics. He chaired the international conference "Deep Metazoan Phylogeny" in Munich in 2011 and the international workshop of the Global Invertebrate Genomics Alliance (GIGA) in Munich in 2015.

== Research ==
=== Deep metazoan phylogenetics ===
A central focus of Wörheide's research has been the reconstruction of deep metazoan phylogeny, particularly the identity of the sister group to all other animals. Using large-scale phylogenomic datasets and improved statistical models of sequence evolution, collaborative studies involving his group provided evidence that Porifera (sponges) are the sister taxon of all other animals, refuting an alternative "Ctenophora-sister" hypothesis that his group argued reflects a compositional artefact in genomic data.

His group has also addressed methodological challenges in phylogenomics, including the effects of compositional heterogeneity on tree topology and the role of the distinction between homology and orthology in analyses of metazoan gene content.

=== Biomineralization ===
A 2007 study in Science, on which Wörheide was corresponding author, demonstrated that carbonic anhydrase played an ancient role in skeletogenesis in coralline sponges (sclerosponges), providing insight into the deep evolutionary origins of animal biomineralization. This work led to a European patent (EP1983054) on carbonic anhydrase and its applications. A 2025 study from his group identified convergent genetic parallels in biomineralization between the calcareous sponge Sycon ciliatum and stony corals.

=== Placozoa genomics ===
Wörheide's group has contributed to the comparative genomics of Placozoa, one of the morphologically simplest animal phyla. A 2018 study provided a large-scale comparative genomic analysis of placozoan diversity, addressing species boundaries and genomic variation within the phylum and described the first animal species purely based on genome data.

=== Evolution of the HIF pathway ===
Using genomic data from early-diverging animal lineages, a 2018 study with Wörheide as corresponding author reconstructed the evolutionary history of the hypoxia-inducible factor (HIF) pathway. The study concluded that the last common ancestor of animals lacked this pathway and likely respired in low-oxygen environments.

=== Bioinformatics tools ===
His group developed TransPi, an open-source bioinformatics pipeline for de novo transcriptome assembly from non-model organisms, distributed via GitHub (PalMuc/TransPi).

== Honours and awards ==
- 2024: Elected Ordinary Member, Leibniz-Sozietät der Wissenschaften zu Berlin
- 2019: Elected Member, Academia Europaea (Section: Evolutionary Biology)
- 2006: BioMed Central Research Award in Biology
- 1998: Prize of the Faculty of Geosciences, University of Göttingen, for outstanding PhD results
- 1998: Inge und Werner Grüter-Preis für Wissenschaftspublizistik (prize for scientific journalism)
- 1998–2000: DAAD Postdoctoral Fellowships (two awards)

== Selected publications ==
- Voigt, O.; Wilde, M.V.; et al. (2025). "Genetic parallels in biomineralization of the calcareous sponge Sycon ciliatum and stony corals". eLife. 14 RP106239. doi:10.7554/eLife.106239. PMC 12419799. PMID 40922549.
- Pett, W.; Adamski, M.; et al. (2019). "The role of homology and orthology in the phylogenomic analysis of metazoan gene content". Molecular Biology and Evolution. 36 (5): 643–649. doi:10.1093/molbev/msz013. hdl:1983/a729a773-b6ef-453a-b028-9baad39ac4bf. PMID 30690573.
- Eitel, M.; Francis, W.R.; et al. (2018). "Comparative genomics and the nature of placozoan species". PLOS Biology. 16 (7) e2005359. doi:10.1371/journal.pbio.2005359. PMC 6067683. PMID 30063702.
- Mills, D.B.; Francis, W.R.; et al. (2018). "The last common ancestor of animals lacked the HIF pathway and respired in low-oxygen environments". eLife. 7 e31176. Bibcode:2018eLife...731176M. doi:10.7554/eLife.31176. PMC 5800844. PMID 29402379.
- Feuda, R.; Dohrmann, M.; et al. (2017). "Improved modeling of compositional heterogeneity supports sponges as sister to all other animals". Current Biology. 27 (26): 3864–3870. Bibcode:2017CBio...27E3864F. doi:10.1016/j.cub.2017.11.008. hdl:10449/43929. PMID 29199080.
- Simion, P.; Philippe, H.; et al. (2017). "A large and consistent phylogenomic dataset supports sponges as the sister group to all other animals". Current Biology. 27 (7): 958–967. Bibcode:2017CBio...27..958S. doi:10.1016/j.cub.2017.02.031. PMID 28318975.
- Pisani, D.; Pett, W.; et al. (2015). "Genomic data do not support comb jellies as the sister group to all other animals". Proceedings of the National Academy of Sciences USA. 112 (50): 15402–15407. Bibcode:2015PNAS..11215402P. doi:10.1073/pnas.1518127112. PMC 4687580. PMID 26621703.
- Philippe, H.; Brinkmann, H.; et al. (2011). "Resolving difficult phylogenetic questions: why more sequences are not enough". PLOS Biology. 9 (3) e1000602. doi:10.1371/journal.pbio.1000602. PMC 3057953. PMID 21423652.
- Philippe, H.; Derelle, R.; et al. (2009). "Phylogenomics revives traditional views on deep animal relationships". Current Biology. 19 (8): 706–712. Bibcode:2009CBio...19..706P. doi:10.1016/j.cub.2009.02.052. PMID 19345102.
- Jackson, D.J.; Macis, L.; Reitner, J.; Degnan, B.M.; Wörheide, G. (2007). "Sponge paleogenomics reveals an ancient role for carbonic anhydrase in skeletogenesis". Science. 316 (5833): 1893–1895. Bibcode:2007Sci...316.1893J. doi:10.1126/science.1141560. PMID 17540861.

== See also ==
Taxa named by Gert Wörheide
