= John Hooper (marine biologist) =

Australian marine biologist

John N.A. Hooper is an Australian marine biologist and writer on science. He is the current Head of Biodiversity & Geosciences Programs at the Queensland Museum. His research has included studying the possible medical benefits of marine sponges, including beta blockers for heart disease, and for compounds to combat illnesses like gastro-intestinal disease and cancer. In 2007 he was a member of the Discussion Panel On Marine Genetic Resources for the eighth annual United Nations Informal Consultative Process for Oceans and the Law of the Sea (UNICPOLOS).

== Notable works ==
Together with Rob van Soest, Hooper co-edited the influential book Systema Porifera: A Guide to the Classification of Sponges. In addition, the Web of Science lists over 90 articles in peer-reviewed journals that have been cited over 1650 times, with an h-index of 24. His three most-cited (>75) articles are:

- Pettit, George R.; Chicacz, Zbigniew A.; Gao, Feng; Herald, Cherry L.; Boyd, Michael R.; Schmidt, Jean M.; Hooper, John N. A. (1993). "Antineoplastic agents. 257. Isolation and structure of spongistatin 1". Journal of Organic Chemistry. 58 (6): 1302–1304. doi:10.1021/jo00058a004.
- Pettit, G. R.; Herald, C. L.; Boyd, M. R.; Leet, J. E.; Dufresne, C.; Doubek, D. L.; Schmidt, J. M.; Cerny, R. L.; Hooper, J. N. A.; Rutzler, K. C. (1991). "Antineoplastic agents. 219. Isolation and structure of the cell growth inhibitory constituents from the western Pacific marine sponge Axinella sp". Journal of Medicinal Chemistry. 34 (11): 3339–40. doi:10.1021/jm00115a027. PMID 1956053.
- Pettit, G. R.; Tan, R.; Gao, F.; Williams, M. D.; Doubek, D. L.; Boyd, M. R.; Schmidt, J. M.; Chapuis, J. C.; Hamel, E. (1993). "Isolation and structure of halistatin 1 from the eastern Indian Ocean marine sponge Phakellia carteri". Journal of Organic Chemistry. 58 (9): 2538. doi:10.1021/jo00061a030.

== See also ==
Taxa named by John Hooper
