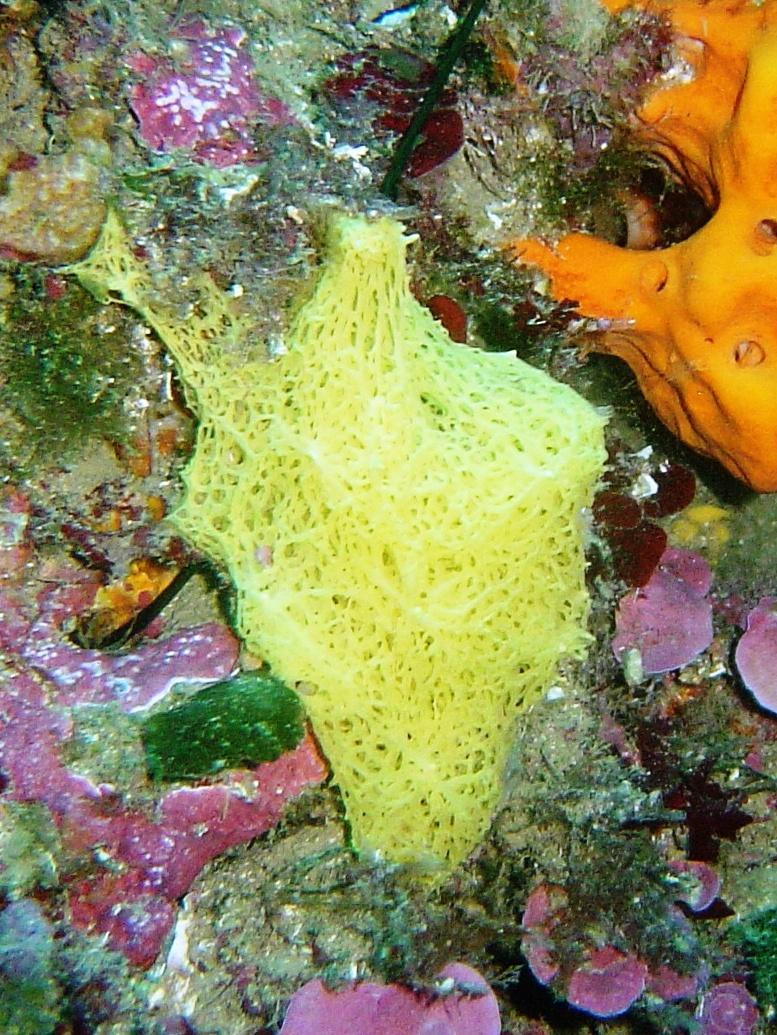
- Clathrina clathrus

Scientific classification
- Kingdom: Animalia
- Phylum: Porifera
- Class: Calcarea
- Order: Clathrinida
- Family: Clathrinidae; Minchin, 1900

Genera
- Arturia; Borojevia; Brattegardia; Clathrina; Janusya; Nicola

Synonyms
- Soleniscida Haeckel, 1870

= Clathrinidae =

Family of sponges

Clathrinidae is a family of calcareous sponges in the order Clathrinida.

This family of sponges has bodies mainly composed of interconnected tubes. The supporting structure, or skeleton, is lined with three-rayed (triactine) spicules, sometimes accompanied by tripod-shaped, four-rayed (tetractine), and two-rayed (diactine) spicules. A continuous choanoderm lines the internal cavities. Water enters through pores in the body wall formed by specialized cells called porocytes.

Young Clathrinidae begin as simple tubes. As they grow, the tubes divide lengthwise, produce buds, and come together to form a larger network called a cormus. The cormus has no shared outer covering and no clearly separated systems of canals for incoming or outgoing water.

Genus Ascilla was formerly assigned to this family, but was reclassified as Neoernsta gracilis in 2023.
