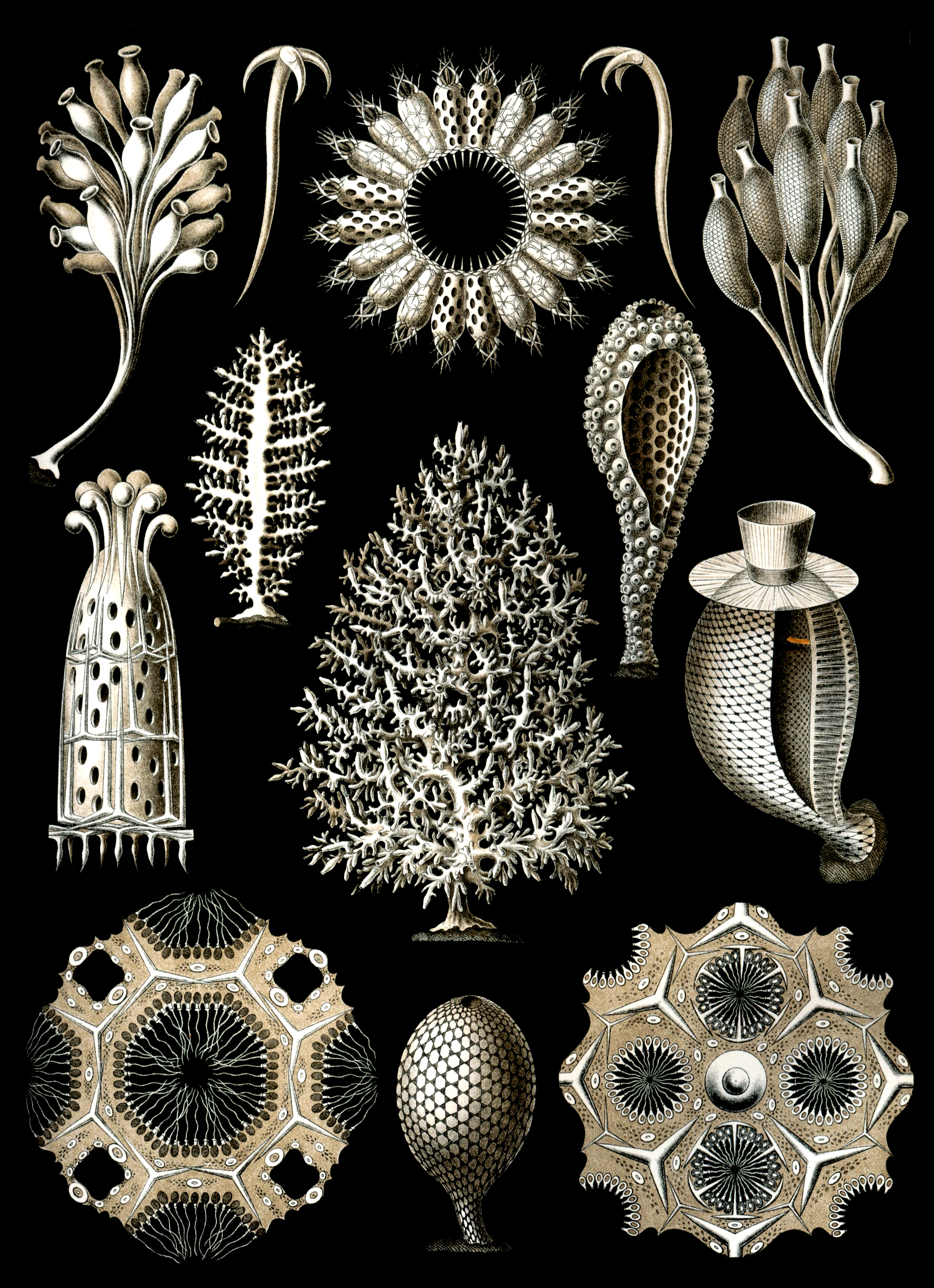
- "Calcispongiae" from Ernst Haeckel's Kunstformen der Natur, 1904

Scientific classification
- Kingdom: Animalia
- Phylum: Porifera
- Class: Calcarea; Bowerbank, 1864

Subclasses
- Calcinea; Calcaronea

= Calcareous sponge =

Calcareous sponges Temporal range: 520–0 Ma Cambrian Series 2 to present

Class of marine sponges with spicules of calcium carbonate

The calcareous sponges or calcereans are sponges that make up the class Calcarea, characterized by spicules made of calcium carbonate in the form of high-magnesium calcite or aragonite. While the spicules in most species are triradiate (with three points in a single plane), some species may possess two- or four-pointed spicules. Unlike the far more common siliceous sponges, calcareans lack microscleres, tiny spicules which reinforce the flesh. In addition, their spicules develop from the outside-in, mineralizing within a hollow organic sheath.

== Biology ==
All sponges in this class are strictly marine, and, while they are distributed worldwide, most are found in shallow tropical waters. Like nearly all other sponges, they are sedentary filter feeders.

All three sponge body plans (asconoid, syconoid, and leuconoid) can be found within the class Calcarea. Typically, calcareous sponges are small, measuring less than 10 cm (3.9 in) in height, and drab in colour. However, a few brightly coloured species are also known.

Like the Homoscleromorpha, calcareous sponges are exclusively viviparous.

Calcareous sponges vary from radially symmetrical vase-shaped body types to colonies made up of a meshwork of thin tubes, or irregular massive forms. The skeleton has either a mesh or honeycomb structure of interlocking spicules. Some extinct species were hypercalcified, meaning that the spicule-based skeleton is cemented together by solid calcite.

== Classification ==
Of the approximately 11,000 living species of Porifera, only around 800 are calcareans. Some older studies applied the name Calcispongiae to the class, though "Calcarea" is much more common in modern nomenclature.

Calcarean sponges likely first appeared during the Cambrian Period. The oldest putative calcarean genus is Gravestockia, from the "Atdabanian" (Cambrian Stage 3) of Australia. Calcareans are probably descended from "heteractinid" sponges, which first appeared in the early Cambrian. Calcareans reached their greatest diversity during the Cretaceous period.

Some molecular analyses suggest the class Calcarea is not exclusively related to other sponges, and should thus be designated as a phylum. This would also render Porifera (the sponge phylum) paraphyletic. Borchiellini et al. (2001) argued that calcareans were more closely related to Eumetazoa (non-sponge animals) than to other sponges. A few studies have also supported a sister group relationship between calcareans and Ctenophora (comb jellies). Many authors have strongly doubted the hypothesis of sponge paraphyly, arguing that genetic studies have incomplete sampling and are incompatible with the unique anatomical traits shared by living sponges.

Calcarea is divided into two subclasses (Calcinea and Calcaronea). The two subclasses are mainly distinguished by spicule orientation, soft tissue and developmental traits. For example, calcineans develop from a parenchymella (a larva with a solid center and radial symmetry). Calcaroneans, on the other hand, develop from an amphiblastula (a larva with a hollow center and semi-bilateral symmetry).

Class Calcarea

- Subclass Calcinea
  - Order Clathrinida [Holocene]
  - Order Murrayonida [Holocene]
- Subclass Calcaronea
  - Order Baerida [Pleistocene–Holocene]
  - Order Leucosolenida / Sycettida [Carboniferous?–Holocene]
  - Order Lithonida [Jurassic–Holocene]
  - Order †Sphaerocoeliida [Permian–Cretaceous]
  - Order †Stellispongiida [Permian–Holocene?]
- Incertae sedis
  - Genus †Gravestockia [Cambrian]

== Gallery ==
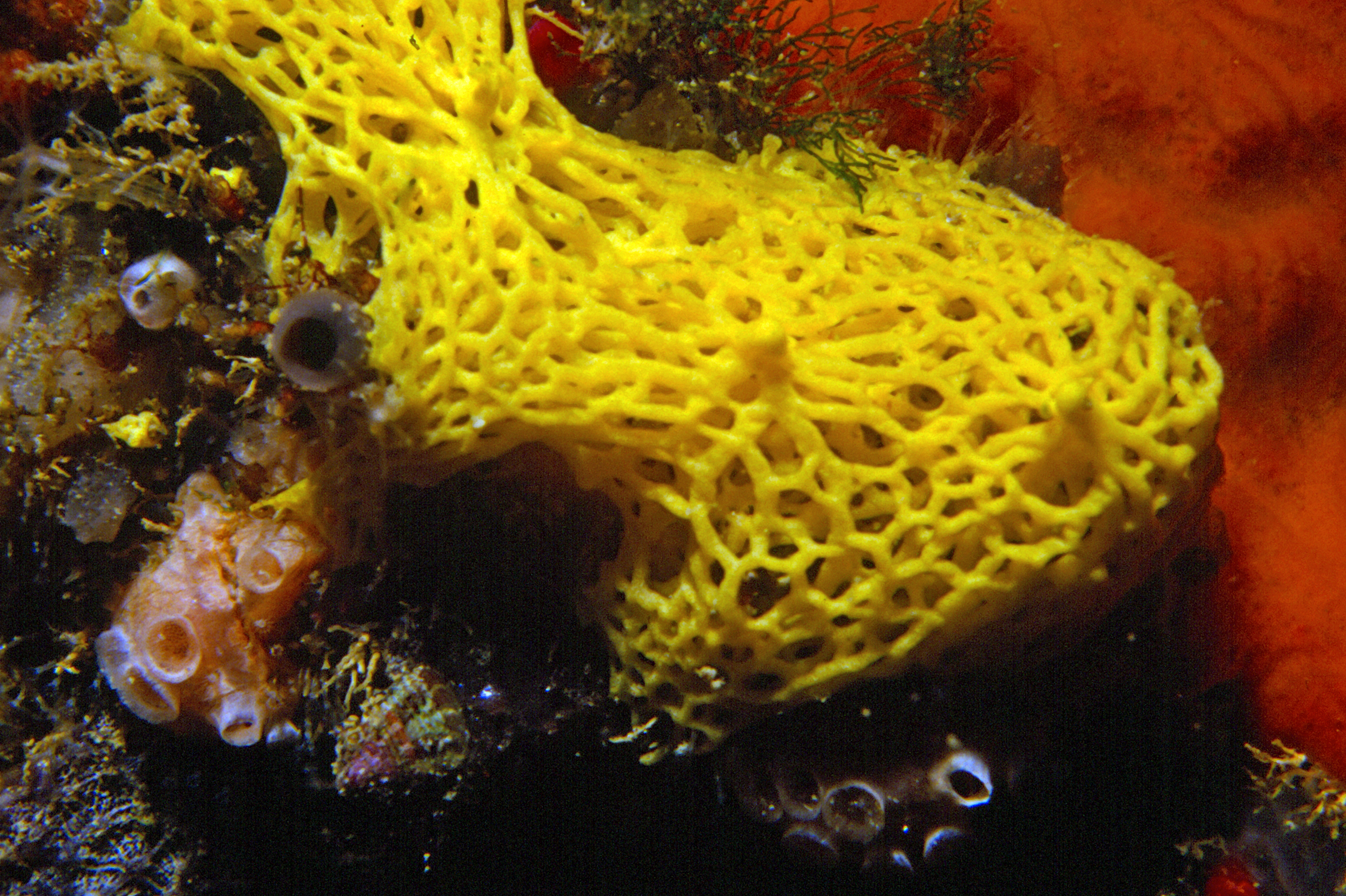
Clathrina clathrus (order Clathrinida)

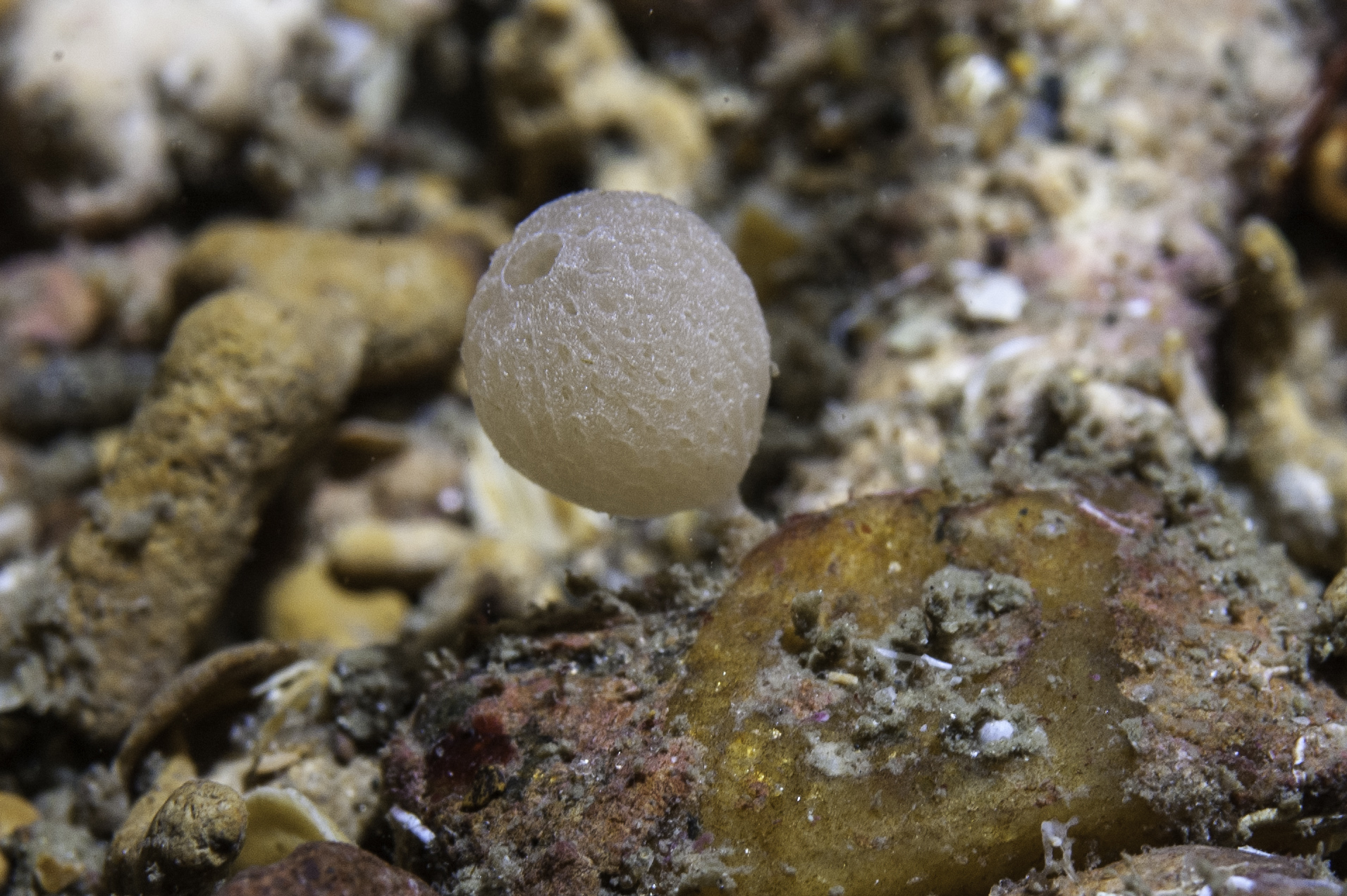
Clathrina lacunosa (order Clathrinida)

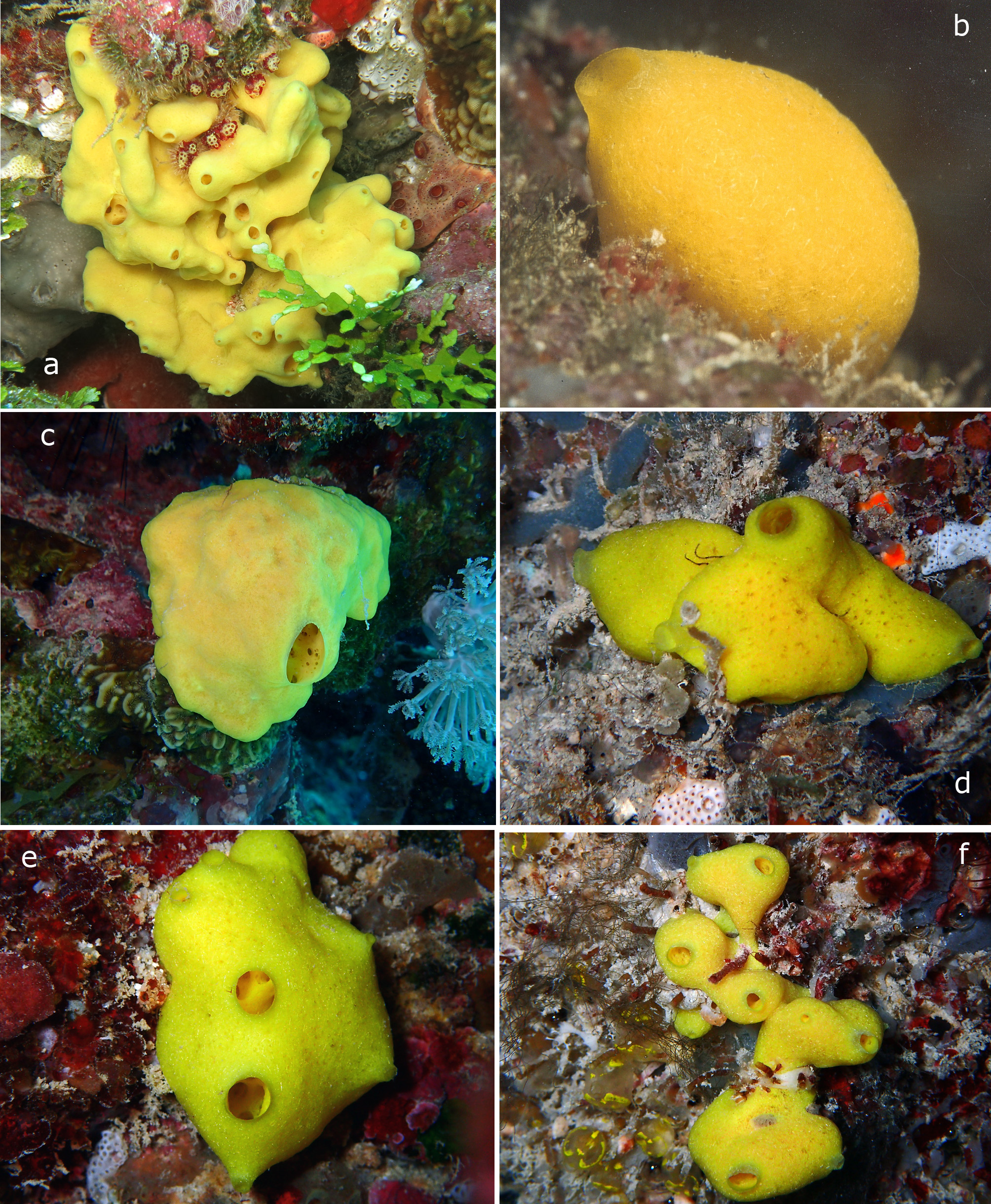
Leucetta chagosensis (order Clathrinida)

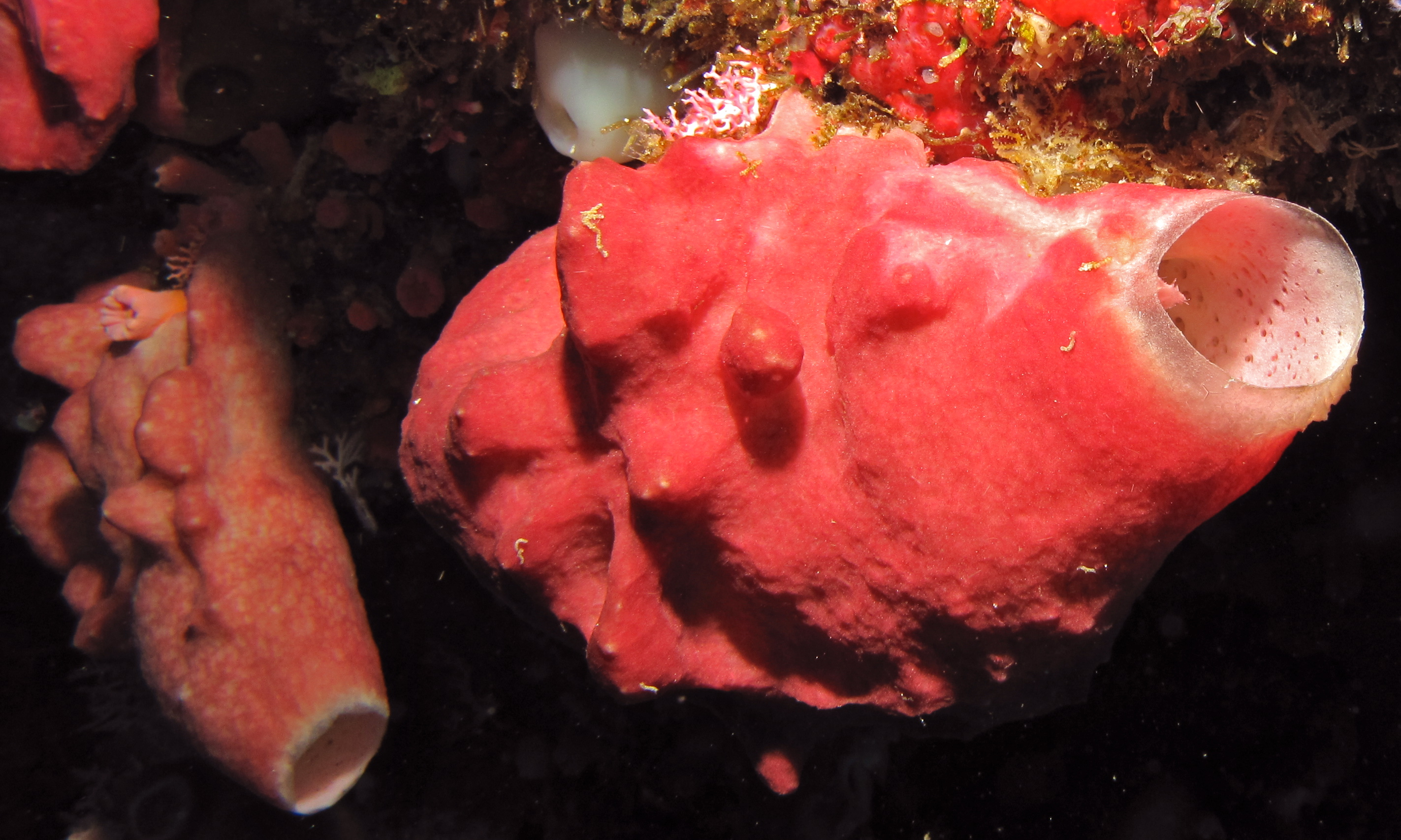
Leucetta primigenia (order Clathrinida)

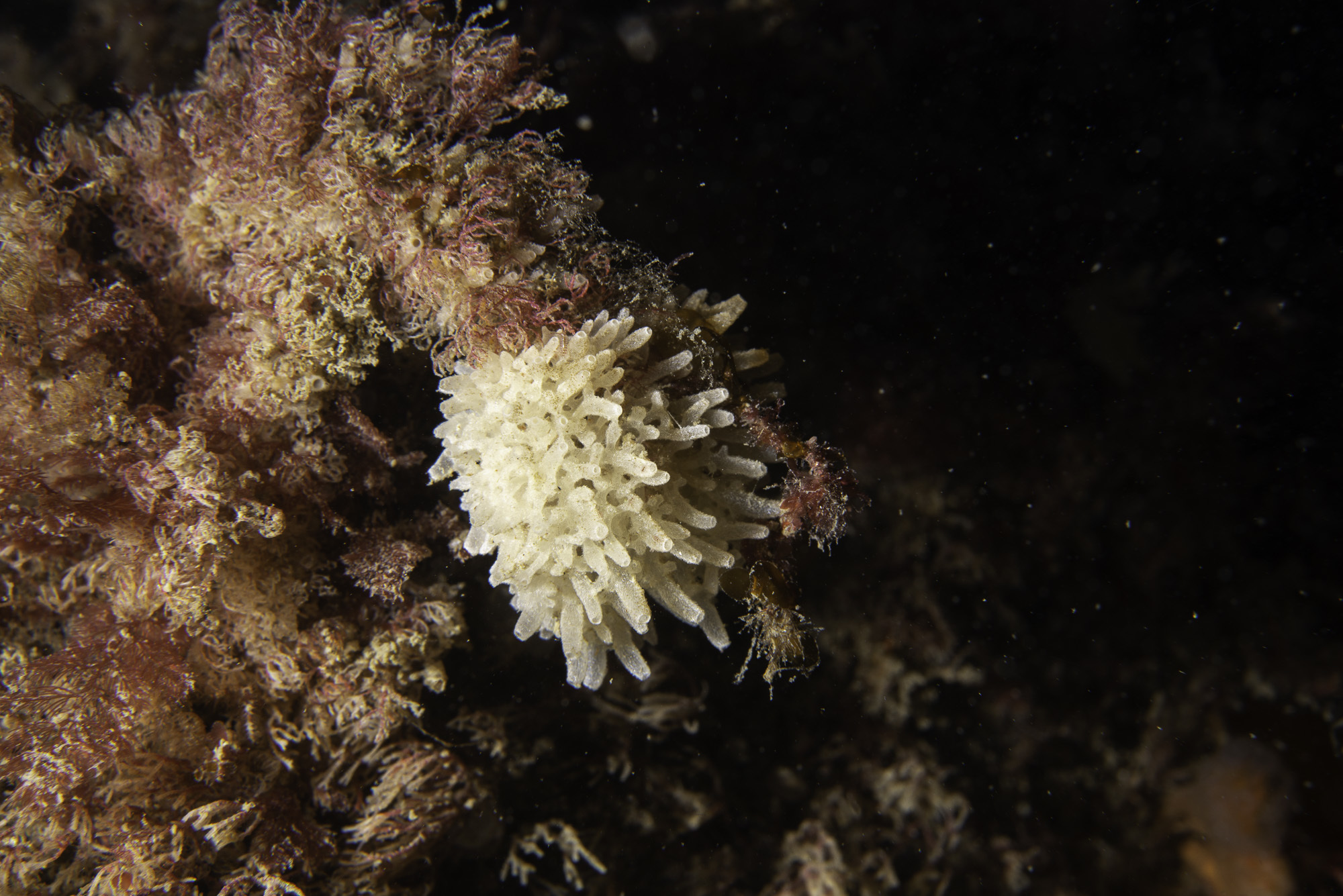
Leucosolenia botryoides (order Leucosolenida)

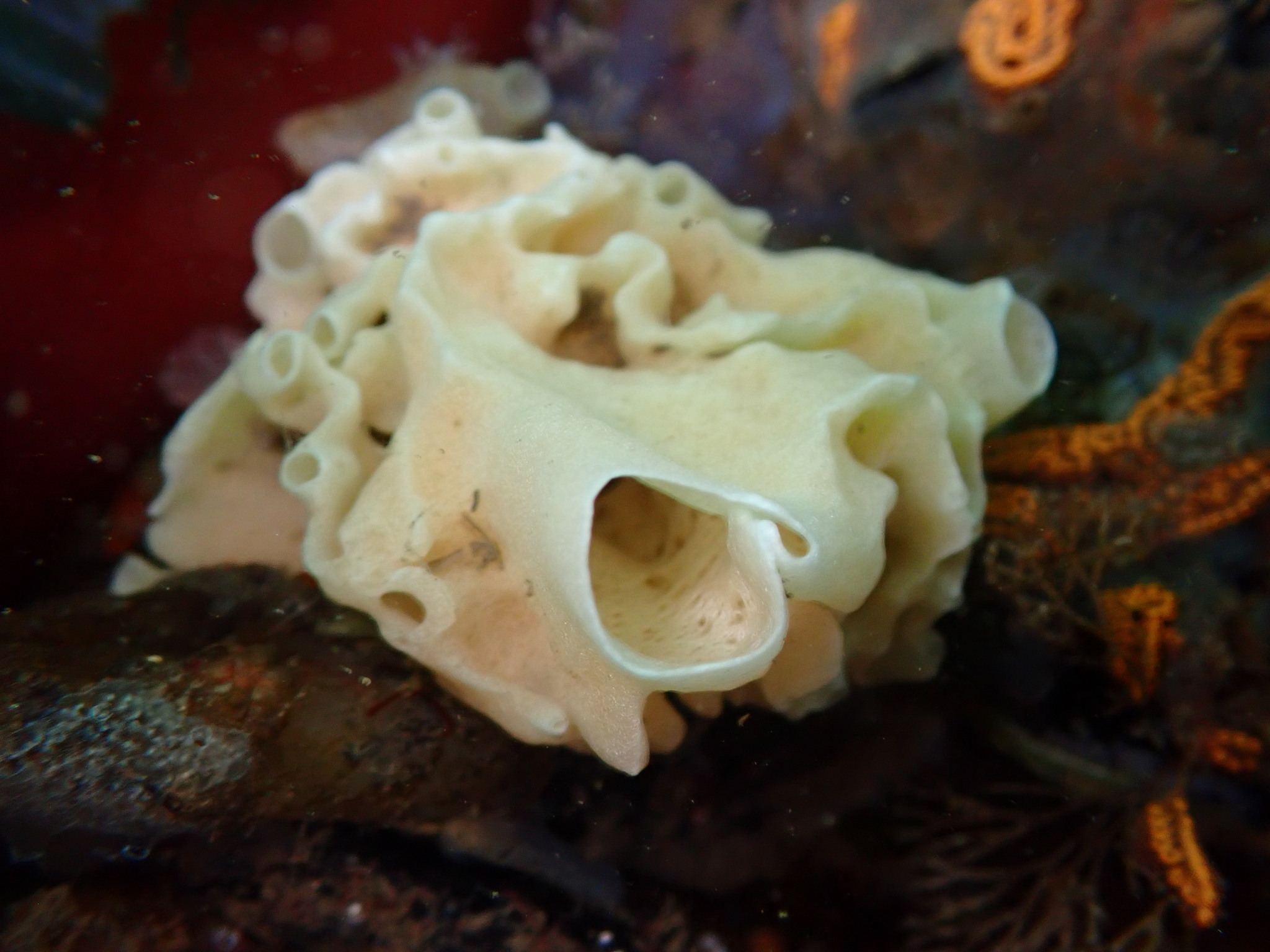
Leucandra losangelensis (order Leucosolenida)

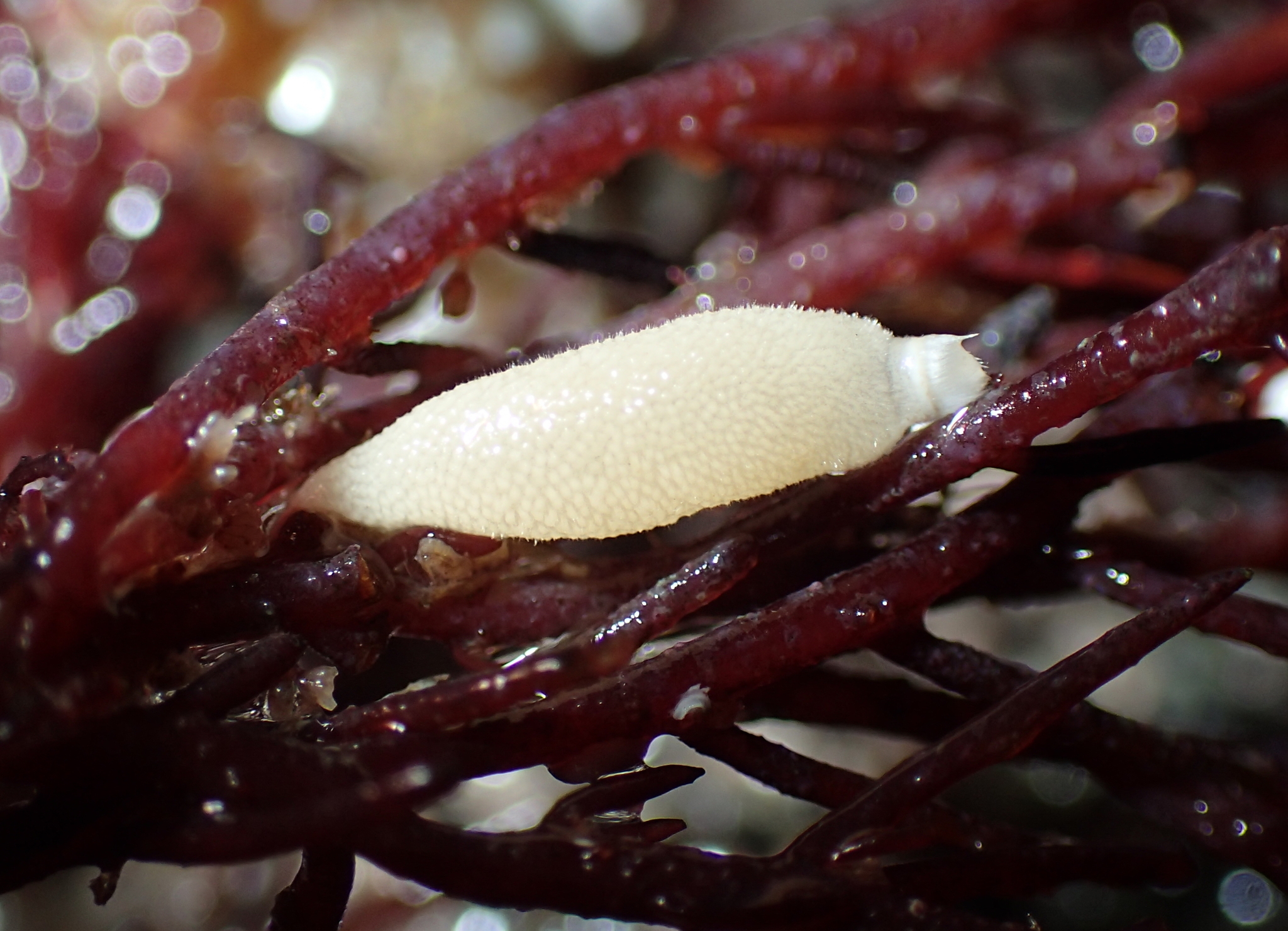
Sycon ciliatum (order Leucosolenida)

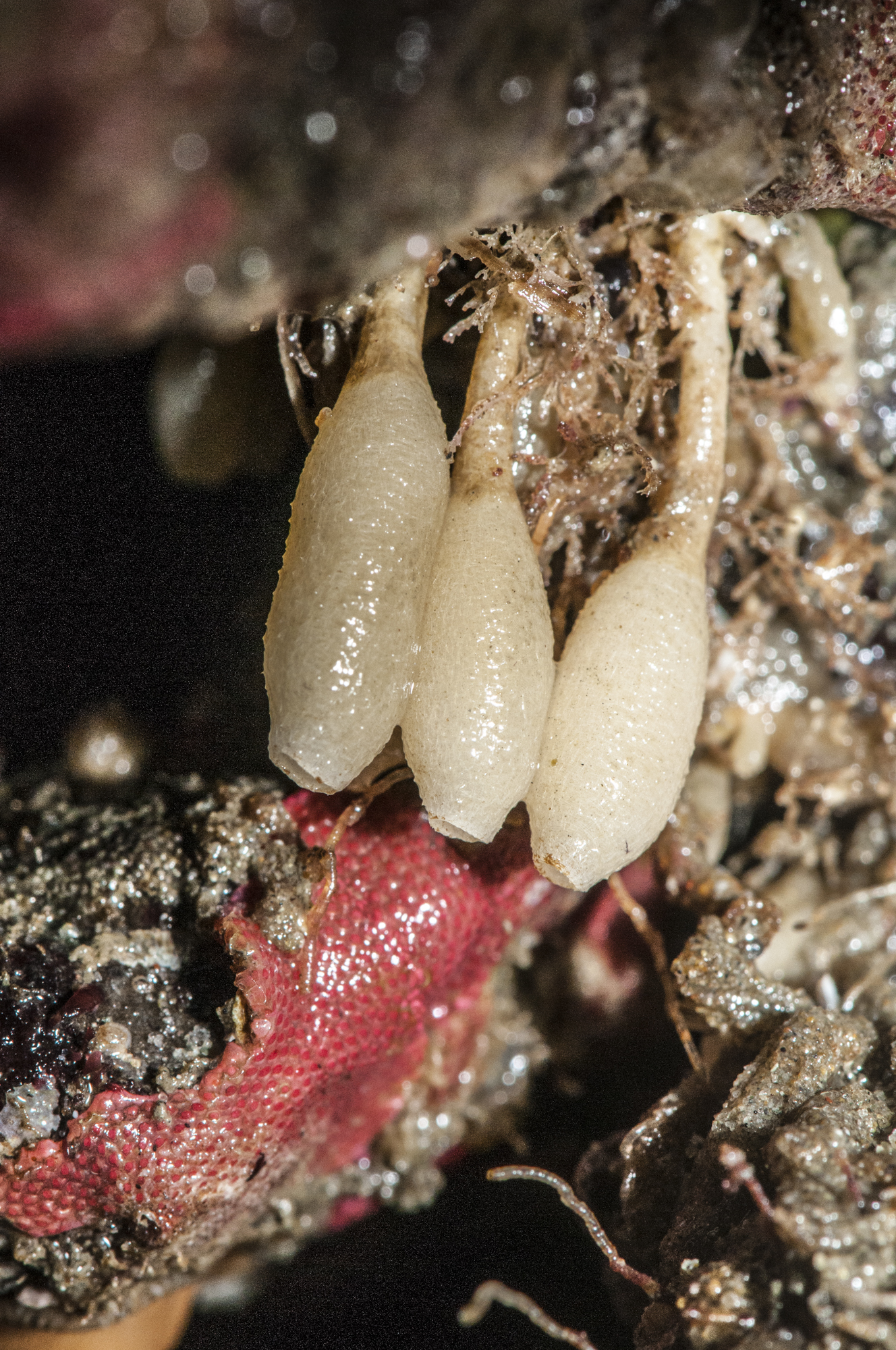
Leucilla nuttingi (order Leucosolenida)

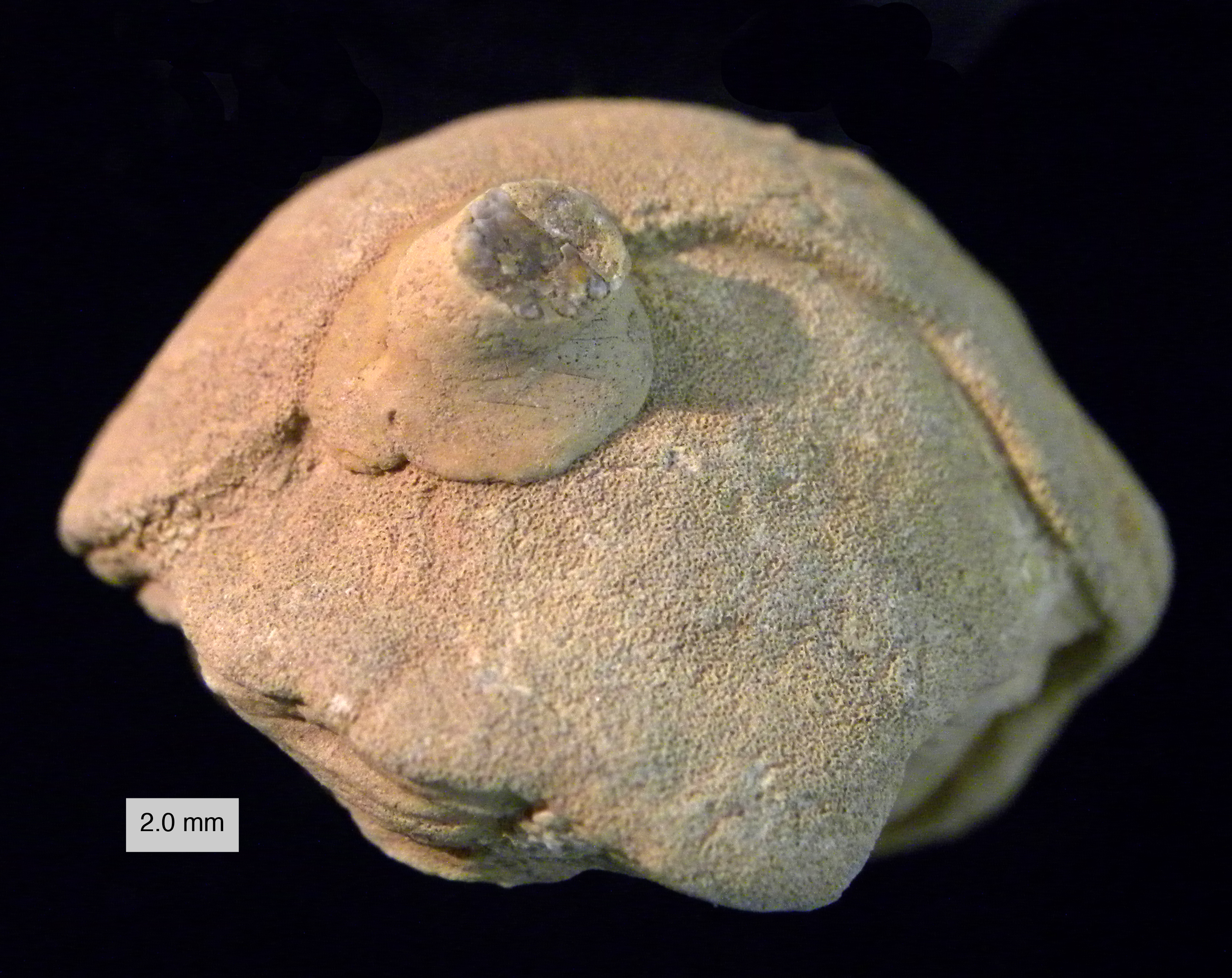
Unidentified calcarean fossil (with encrusting crinoid) from the Jurassic of Israel

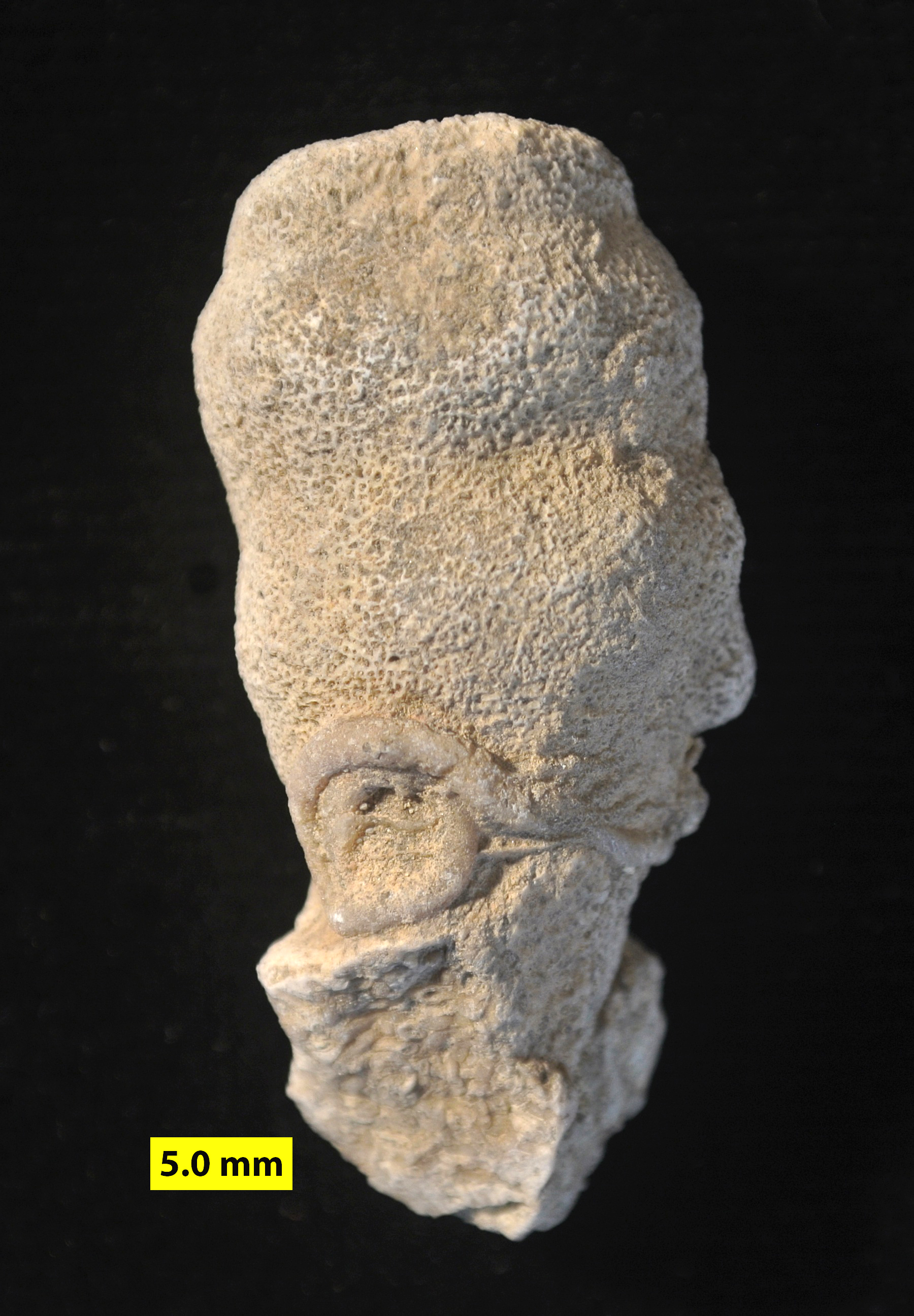
†Peronidella fossil (order †Stellispongiida) from the Jurassic of Israel

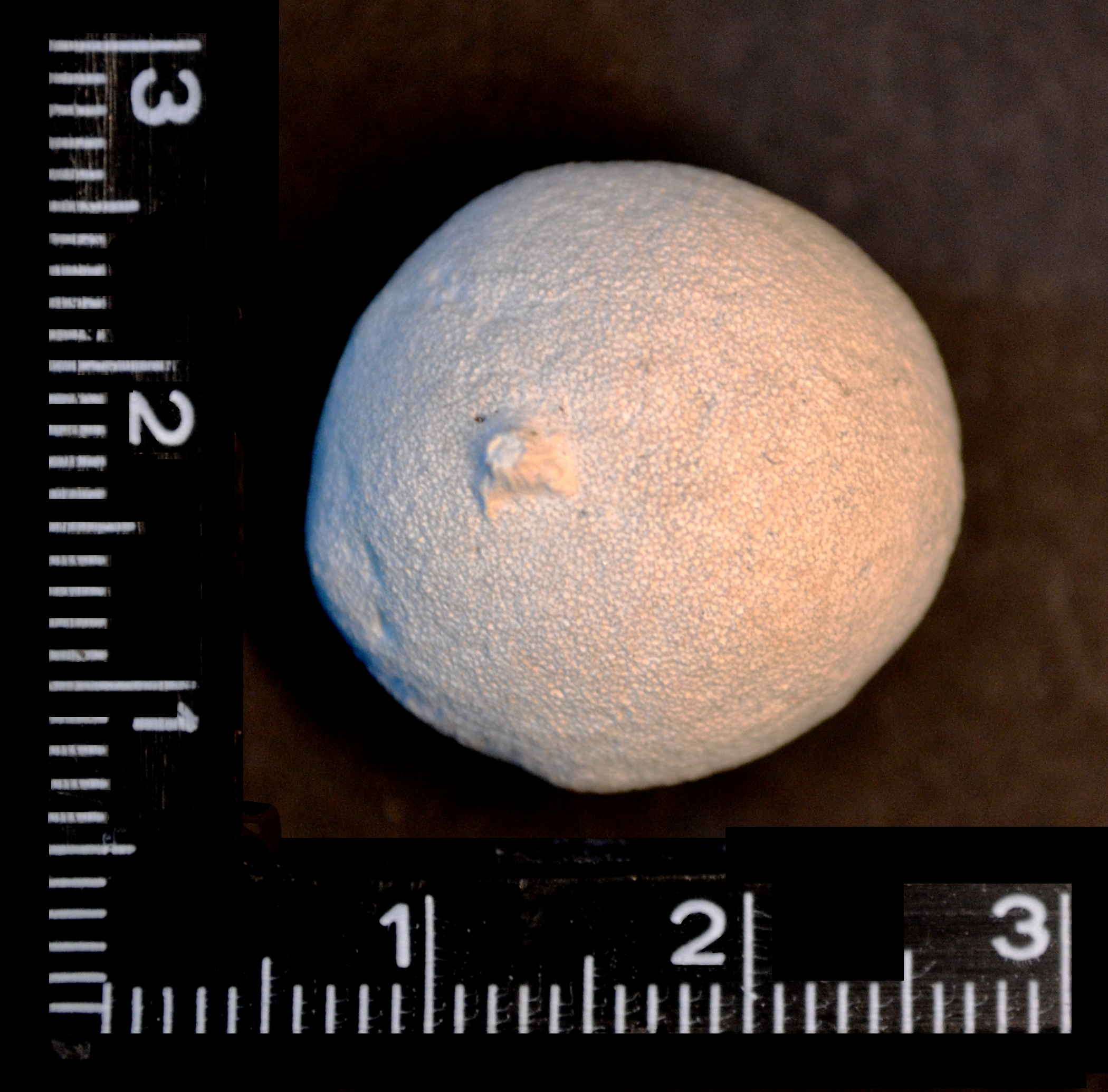
†Porosphaera globularis fossil (order Lithonida) from the Cretaceous of Germany
