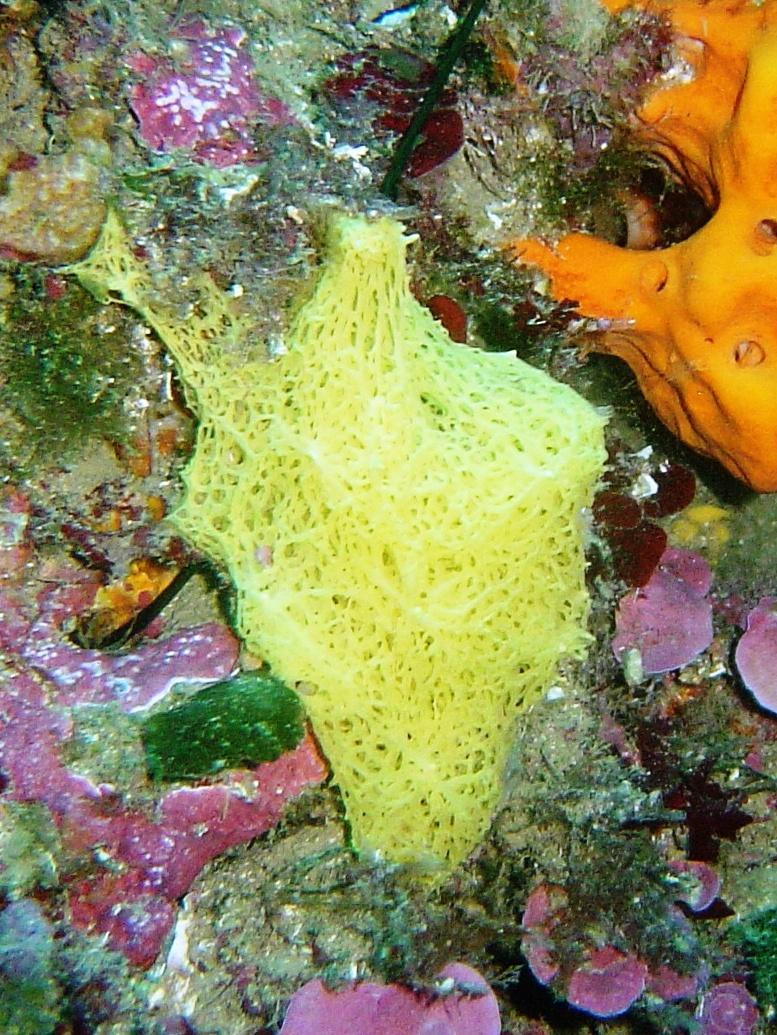
- Clathrina clathrus

Scientific classification
- Kingdom: Animalia
- Phylum: Porifera
- Class: Calcarea
- Subclass: Calcinea
- Order: Clathrinida; Hartman, 1958

Families
- Clathrinidae; Dendyidae; Lelapiellidae; Leucaltidae; Leucascidae; Leucettidae; Levinellidae; Murrayonidae; Paramurrayonidae; Rappya

Synonyms
- Leucettida; Murrayonida

= Clathrinida =

Order of sponges

The Clathrinida are an order of calcareous sponges found in marine environments. Clathrinida is a well-known non-monophyletic order under the class of calcarea, and was first named in 1958 by Willard D Hartman based on corticalization (body cortex)[5]. The fossil record of calcarea is relatively poor due to the nature of sponge – the fossil remains often don’t have the diagnostic spicules – but it’s certain that they are common in the Paleozoic and Mesozoic but rare in the Cenozoic [7].

These sponges have an asconoid structure and lack a true dermal membrane or cortex. The spongocoel is lined with choanocytes. One of the most famous species of Clathrinida is lemon sponge, featuring a bright yellow color and a slightly elongated-globular growth form [7].

== Basic Structure ==
The Clathrinida is a rich and variable tubular marine sponge with calcareous skeletons. The sponge is organized into simple tubes called the olynthus with an internal and external layer. Both layers are present in the early development stages of Clathrinida and the complex adult body still originates from the original olynthus [1]. The adults grow from the olynthus and through division the tube is separated into separate functional units called cormus. These separate units have degrees of differentiation based on their function, but have a central tube taking the function of the atrium [5]. This organism also includes spicules made of calcium carbonate and have up to four rays that radiate from a single point. Skeleton and body anastomosis are the most widely used characteristics when assigning the taxonomy for Clathrinida [1]. In general, the skeleton and body anastomosis (the connection of healthy sections of tubular structures in the body) are valid similar characteristics that define the taxonomy of the order [8]. For obvious physical characteristics, the Clathrinida comes in several colors such as white, red, yellow, or pink and are all relatively small measuring up to a few centimeters [1].

== Traits (reproduction, diet, life stages, movement) ==
All developmental stages are present and Clathrinidae use the classic steps of organization: ascon, sycon, and leucon. These steps allow Clathrinida to move from a unicellular organism to a multicellular one [8]. This organism uses a olynthus grade, a short lived stage of development where the colony attaches to a substrate of organization to grow and divide. They also use anastomosis, a cross connection or network of tubes, to form their larger functional unit. The network and organization of small and large functional tubes is obtained through median division of simple tubes. Through this process, radial organization is established with the central tube taking the job of the digestive system releasing excretory products [6]. This is also known as the cloaca. Once this is established, the organism moves from larvae stages to their adult stage. Once the adult stage is reached, the sponge becomes sessile, meaning they are immobile [8]. Due to their structure, Clathrinidae are able to filter a large mass of ocean water and therefore eat small organisms such as detritus, picoplankton, and heterotrophic bacteria. This makes them omnivores that are significant in the process of nutrient cycling in the water column [4].

Because the sponges are sedimentary, they are vulnerable to the impacts of climate change, commercial fishing, oil exploitation, and other human activities. Additionally, marine sponges are known to be long-lived and slow-growing, so they are likely to be vulnerable to human disturbance and environmental change [9]

== Distribution ==
Clathrinida is an order of calcareous sponges that can be found in all seas. They are more likely to be found in shallow, shaded habitats, often within several meters of the surface. For example, marine caves and other less-exposed, shallow, but benthic environments [4]. They are also abundant in rich temperate estuaries and Pacific coral reefs. During higher temperatures, they are more abundant because they are sexually reproductive. Sponges are more readily permeated by water than other organisms, so changes in water temperature can affect their behavior and physiology [5]. As they can survive in a broad range of conditions, their permeability does not limit the reaches of Clathrinidia, but concentrates species in their preferred habitat of warmer, shallow regions of the seas [4].

== Evolutionary History ==
The order is currently rapidly expanding and the resulting species are rich in variety. These calcareous sponges have an unknown fossilization process, however, which means that there may have been more intermediaries that we do not have records of [6]. Clathrinidia, being a diverse group, have many tracked evolutionary lines, meaning that different species of Clathrinidia may have evolved to be similar by convergence, rather than divergence.

== Taxonomy ==
Animalia (kingdom) → Porifera (phylum) → Calcarea (class) → Calcinea (subclass) → Clathrinida (order)

=== History of Classification of Clathrinida ===
In 1872, Ernst Haeckel first classified the class of calcareous sponges under porifera phylum based on the composition of spicules and the aquiferous system. His method was criticized by other taxonomists, who believed Haeckel’s taxonomic scheme is unnatural. One of the critics was Poléjaeff, who proposed a more natural taxonomy in 1883, which adopted the auriferous part of Haeckel’s proposal. Several taxonomists struggled for another 70 years, and divided calcareous sponges into two subclasses based on cytological and skeletal traits: Calcinea and Calcaronea. In 1958, Hartman proposed the order Clathrinida and Leucettida under subclass Calcinea, taking body cortex as the key character. And then in 2002, Borojevic and other taxonomists stated that the order Leucettida was extinct as corticalization and the aquiferous systems evolved in several lineages.

=== Calcarea ===
All sponges in this class are strictly marine, and, while they are distributed worldwide, most are found in shallow tropical waters. Like nearly all other sponges, they are sedentary filter feeders. Of the 15,000 or so species of Porifera that exist, only 400 of those are calcareans. Calcarean sponges first appeared during the Cambrian, and their diversity was greatest during the Cretaceous period.

=== Calcinea ===
The subclass Calcinea is monophyletic, meaning descended from a common evolutionary ancestor without sharing with any other group. There are two orders under Calcinea: Clathrinida and Murrayonida. There is debate about whether Murrayonida is at the same phylogenetical level as Clathrinida, or is within Clathrinida, since some researchers are not convinced that hyper-calcified skeleton is a valid taxonomic character.

=== Clathrinida ===
Clathrinida is a well-known non-monophyletic order. In 2013, Klautau and his team proposed that skeleton and body anastomosis are the most valid characters when assigning the taxonomy for Clathrinida. The team used DNA sequencing to confirm the biological source of 50 species within 8 genera of Clathrinida, and re-classified Clathrinida into 10 genera.

==== 10 Genera that Klautau proposed ====
===== (1) Clathrina =====
- All species in Clathrina genus are lack of tetractines in their skeleton.
- Including Clathrina clathrus, Clathrina helveola, Clathrina cylindractina, Guancha ramose, Guancha aff. blanca, etc.

===== (2) Ernstia =====
- Species in Ernstia have triactines and tetractines, and regular clathroid body quite similar to that of Clathrina.
- Including Clathrina sp.nov.1 from Brazil, Clathrina sp.nov.2 from Brazil, Clathrina sp.nov.13 from Indonesia, and Clathrina tetractina from Brazil.

===== (3) Ascandra =====
- Sister group of genus Ernstia, but species in genus Ascandra have loose free tubes in apical region of their cormus.

===== (4) Ascaltis =====
- One species of Clathrina reticulum, characterized by tightly free tubes, and a pseudo-atrium with no pinacoderm.

===== (5) Leucascus =====
- One species of Leucascus simplex with has tightly free tubes, a true atrium with pinacoerm, apical actines with spines, and a solenoid aquiferous system.

===== (6) Arthuria =====
- One species of Clathrina hirsute. C. hirsute has triactines, and tetractines.

===== (7) Borojevia =====
- Characterized by well-defined cormus with tripods on the external tubes, triactines, and tetractines with spines on the apical actines.
- Including Clathrina brasiliensis, Clathrina cerebrum, Clathrina aspina, etc.

===== (8) Leucaltis =====
- Leucaltis clathria from Australia and Caribbean. Characterized by large tubes each with distinct cortex with large spicules.

===== (9) Brattegardia =====
- One species of Clathrina nanseni with a single osculum and a cormus surrounded by a membrane. Characterized by skeleton with triactines and 2 tetractines (normal apical actine and rudimentary knob-like apical actine).

===== (10) Original Leucaltis nuda =====
- Including Leucetta floridana, Leucetta microraphis, Pericharax heteroaphis, Leucettusa nuda, Leucetta pyriformis, etc.
