= List of sponges of Ireland =

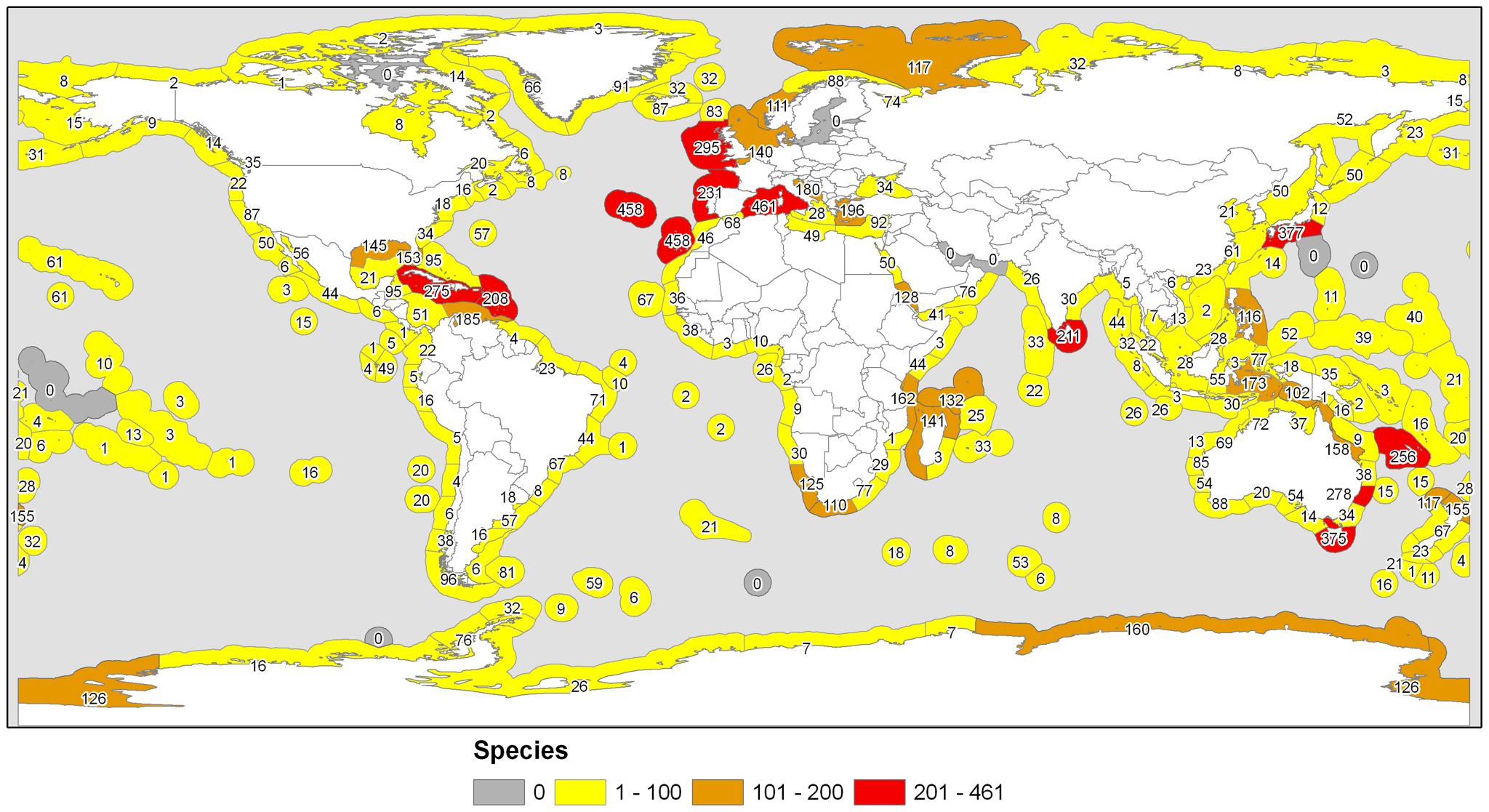
Numbers of sponge species recorded in each of 232 marine ecoregions of the world. Irish waters are shaded red, indicating the high diversity of sponge species.

There are 290 species of sponges recorded in Ireland, although the true figure is thought to be close to 500; 134 species were recorded off Rathlin Island alone.

Sponges are animals of the phylum Porifera; sessile aquatic animals without true tissues.

== Class Calcarea (calcareous sponges) ==
=== Order Clathrinida ===
==== Family Clathrinidae ====
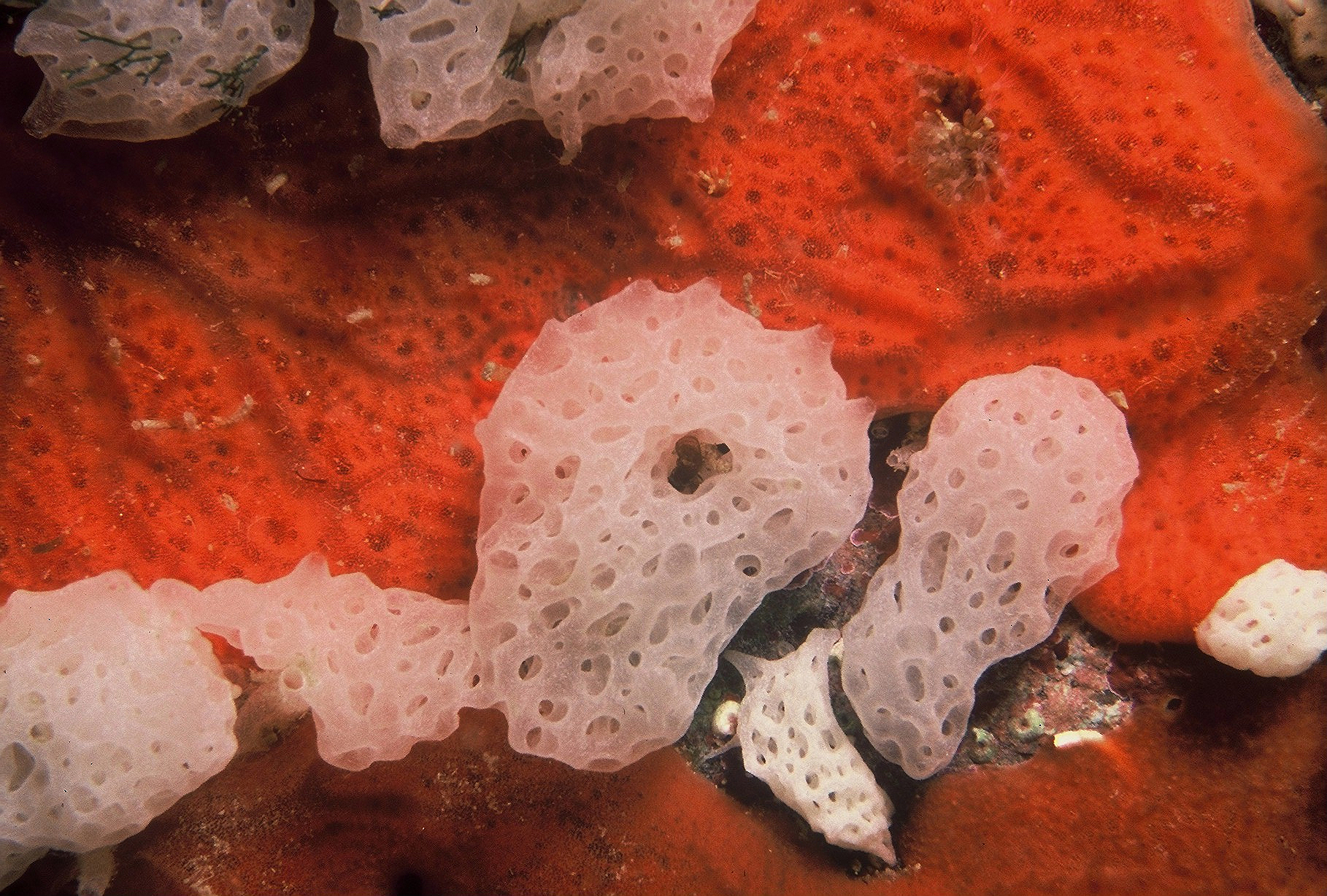
Clathrina contorta growing on Spirastrella cunctatrix

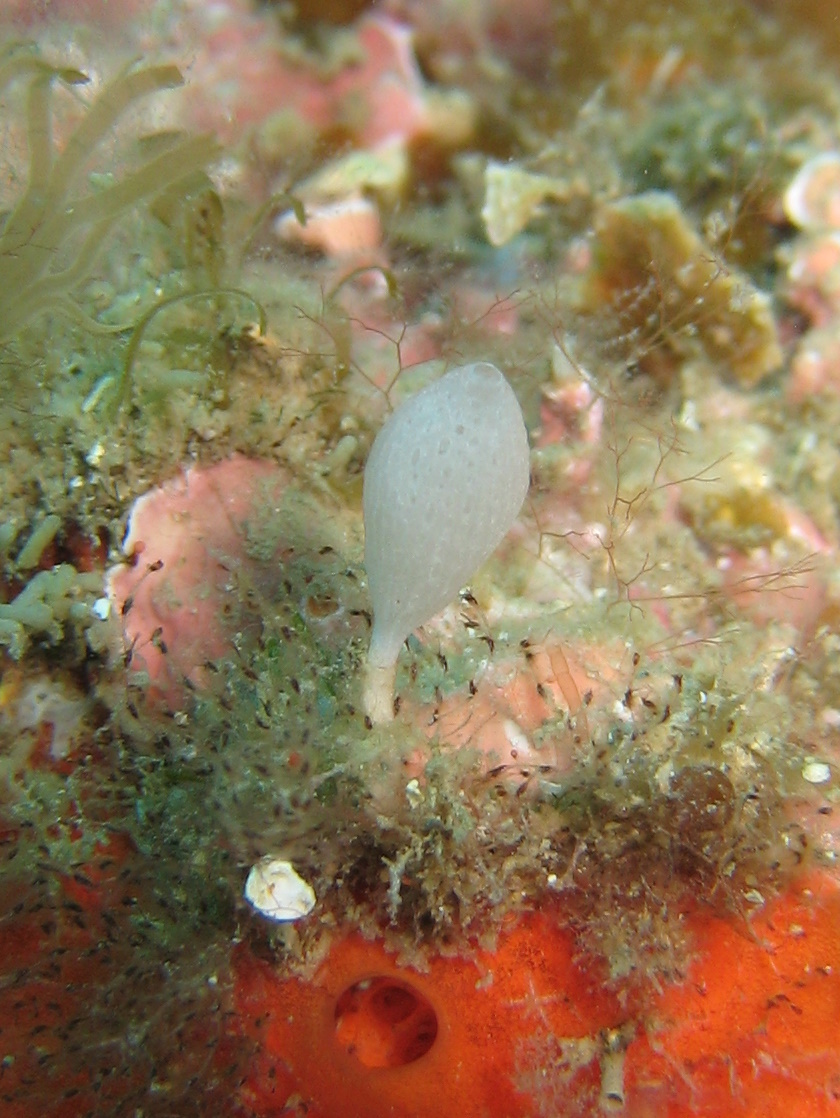
Guancha lacunosa

- Clathrina contorta (Ascandra contorta)
- Clathrina coriacea (Ascandra coriacea)
- Clathrina lacunosa

=== Order Leucosolenida ===
==== Family Grantiidae ====
- Grantia compressa (purse sponge)
- Leucandra fistulosa
- Leucandra gossei
- Leuconia johnstoni
- Leuconia nivea

==== Family Leucosoleniidae ====
- Leucosolenia botryoides
- Leucosolenia complicata
- Leucosolenia variabilis

==== Family Sycettidae ====
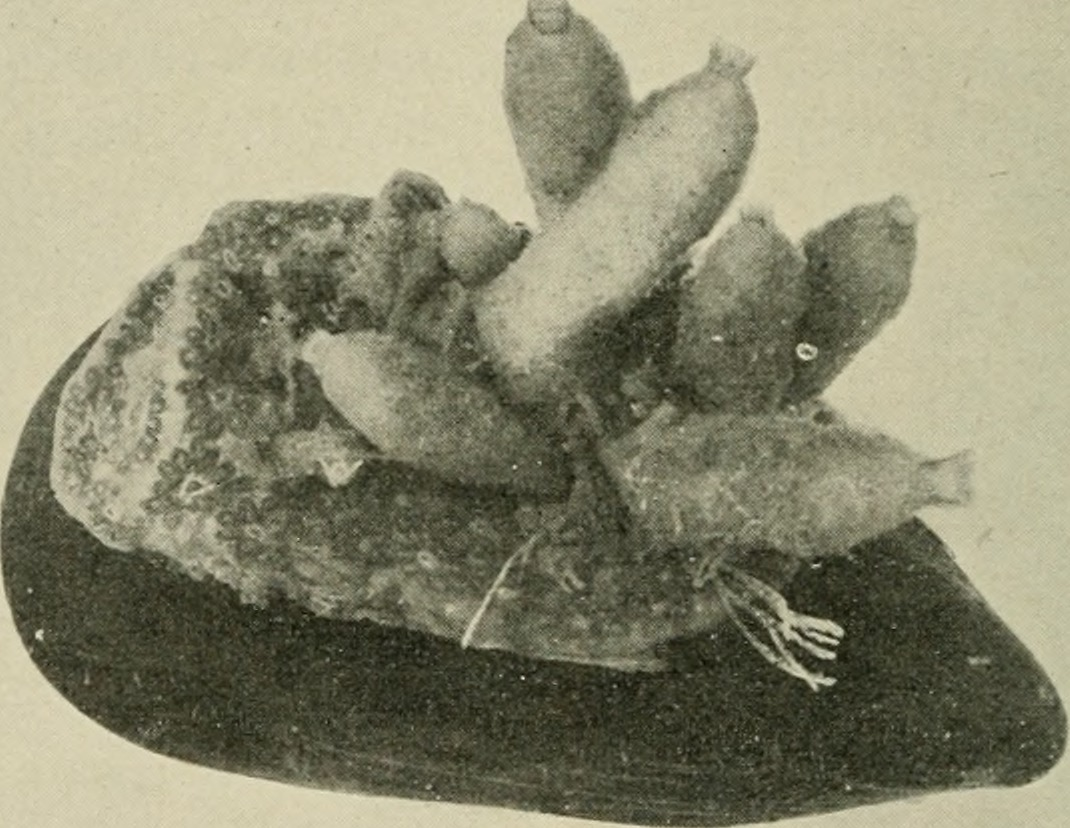
Sycon ciliatum

- Sycon ciliatum
- Sycon elegans

== Class Demospongiae (horny sponges) ==
=== Order Agelasida ===
==== Family Hymerhabdiidae ====
- Hymerhabdia typica

=== Order Astrophorida ===
==== Family Geodiidae ====
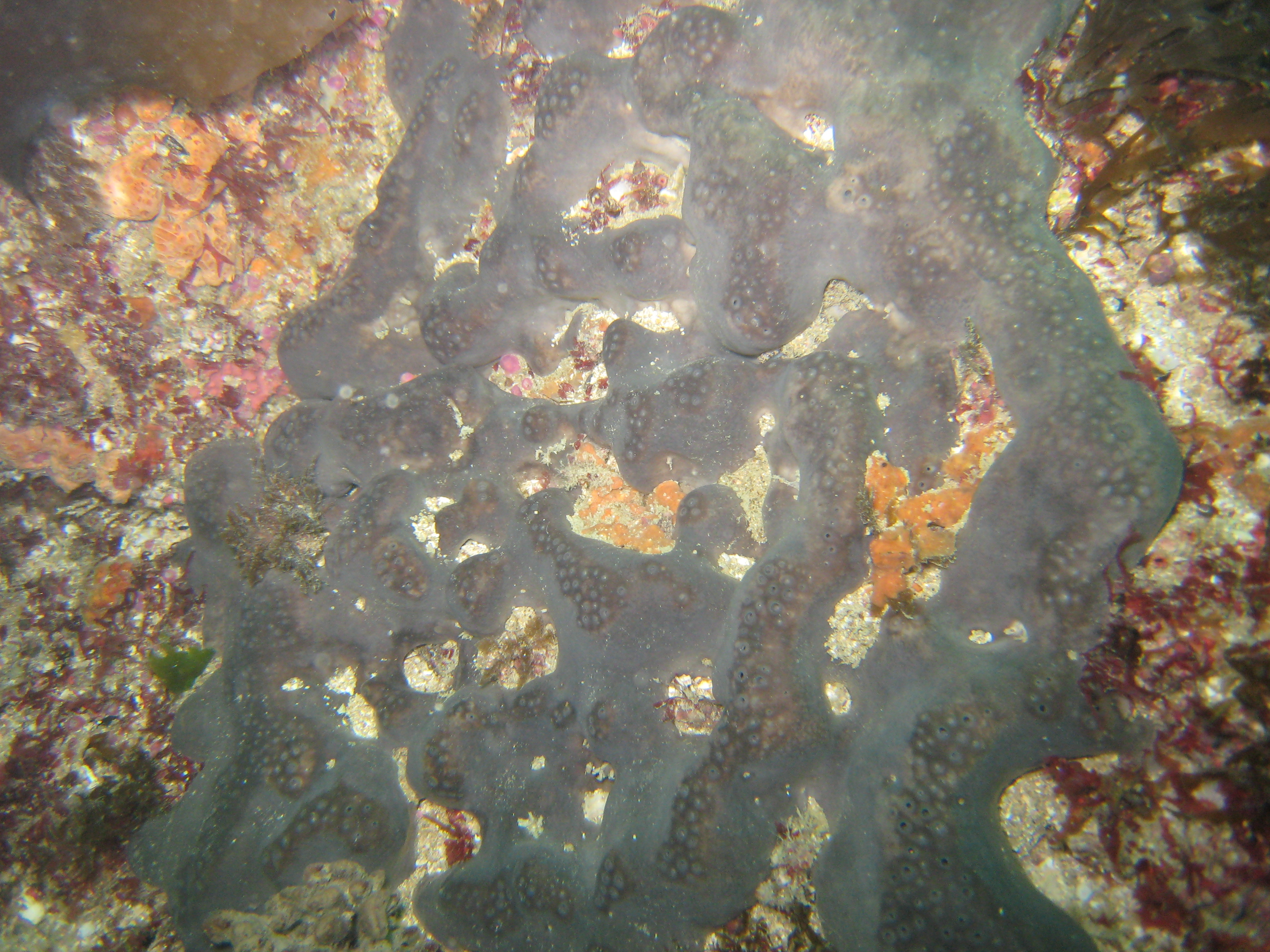
Pachymatisma johnstonia

- Pachymatisma johnstonia

=== Order Axinellida ===
==== Family Raspailiidae ====
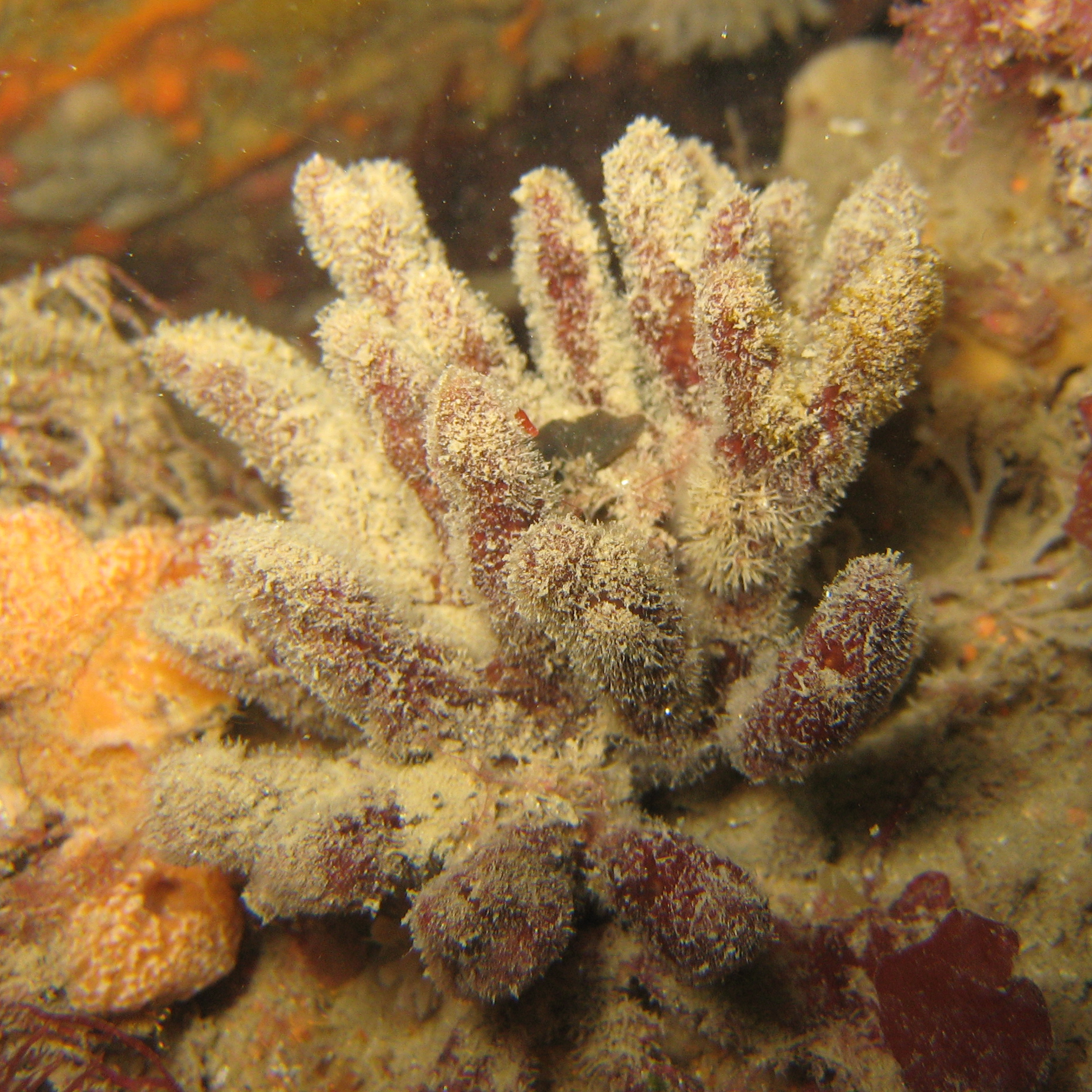
Raspailia ramosa

- Eurypon viride
- Eurypon clavatum
- Eurypon major
- Hymeraphia breeni
- Hymeraphia elongata
- Hymeraphia stellifera
- Hymeraphia verticillata
- Raspaciona aculeata
- Raspailia hispida
- Raspailia ramosa

==== Family Stelligeridae ====
- Halicnemia patera
- Stelligera rigida
- Stelligera stuposa

=== Order Bubarida ===
==== Family Bubaridae ====
- Bubaris vermiculata

==== Family Dictyonellidae ====
- Dictyonella incisa
- Spongionella pulchella
- Tethyspira spinosa

=== Order Chondrillida ===
==== Family Halisarcidae ====
- Halisarca dujardini

=== Order Chondrosida ===
==== Family Chondrillidae ====
- Thymosia guernei

=== Order Dendroceratida (keratose/horny sponges) ===
==== Family Darwinellidae ====
- Aplysilla rosea
- Aplysilla sulfurea

=== Order Dictyoceratida (keratose/horny sponges) ===
==== Family Dysideidae ====
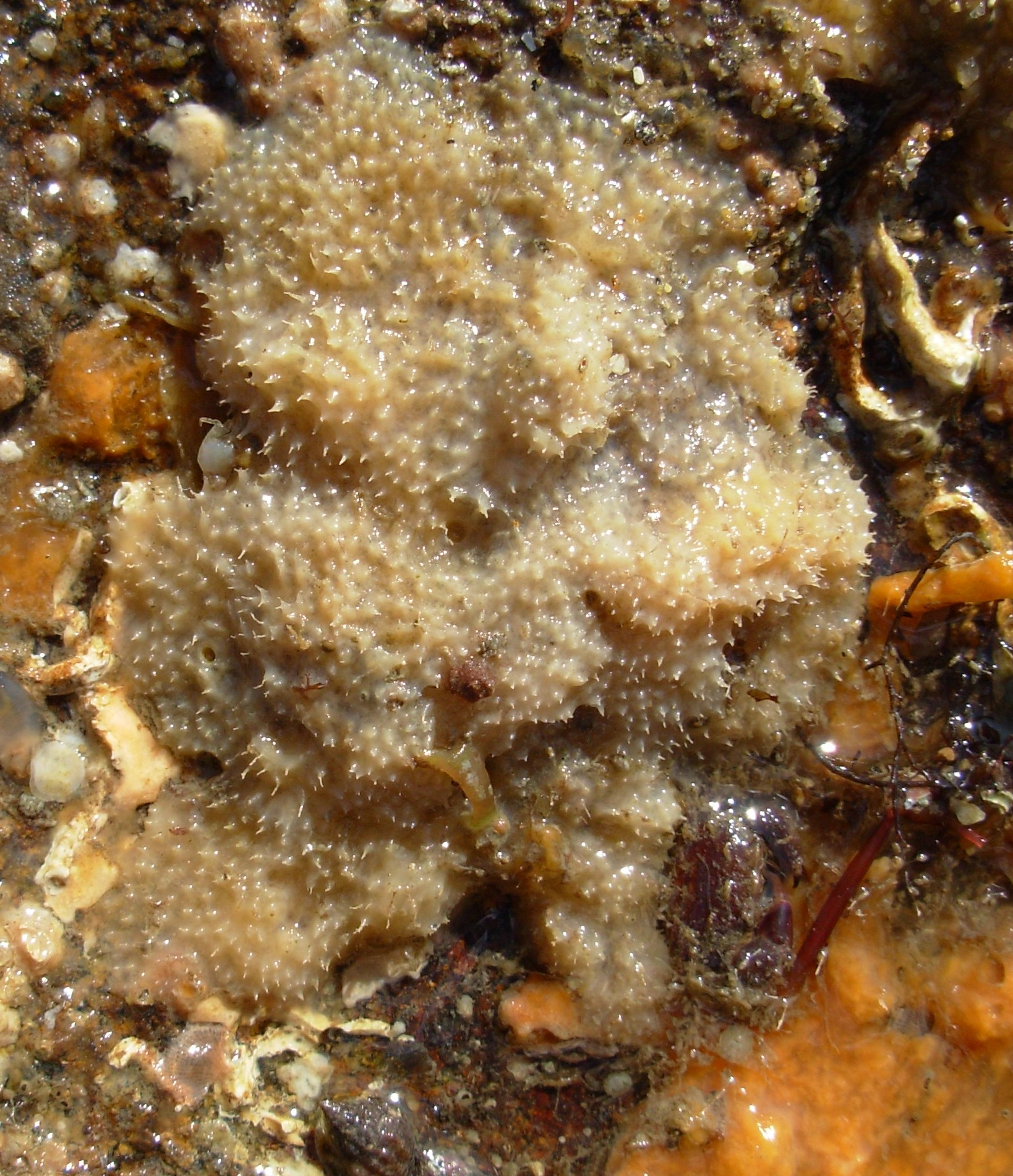
Dysidea fragilis

- Dysidea fragilis
- Dysidea pallescens

=== Order Hadromerida ===
==== Family Clionaidae ====
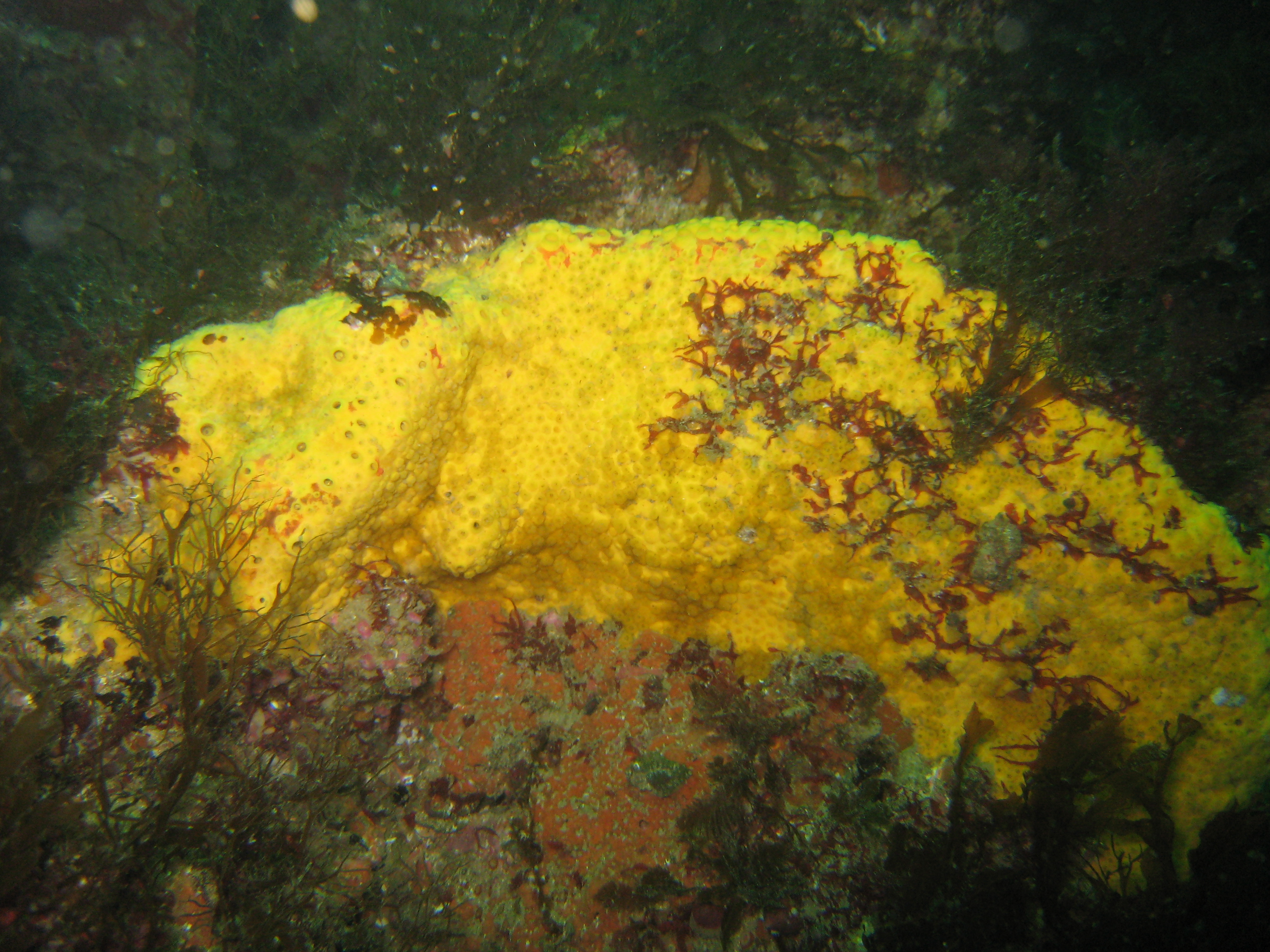
Red boring sponge

- Cliona celata (red boring sponge)
- Cliona lobata

==== Family Hemiasterellidae ====
- Paratimea constellata

==== Family Polymastiidae ====
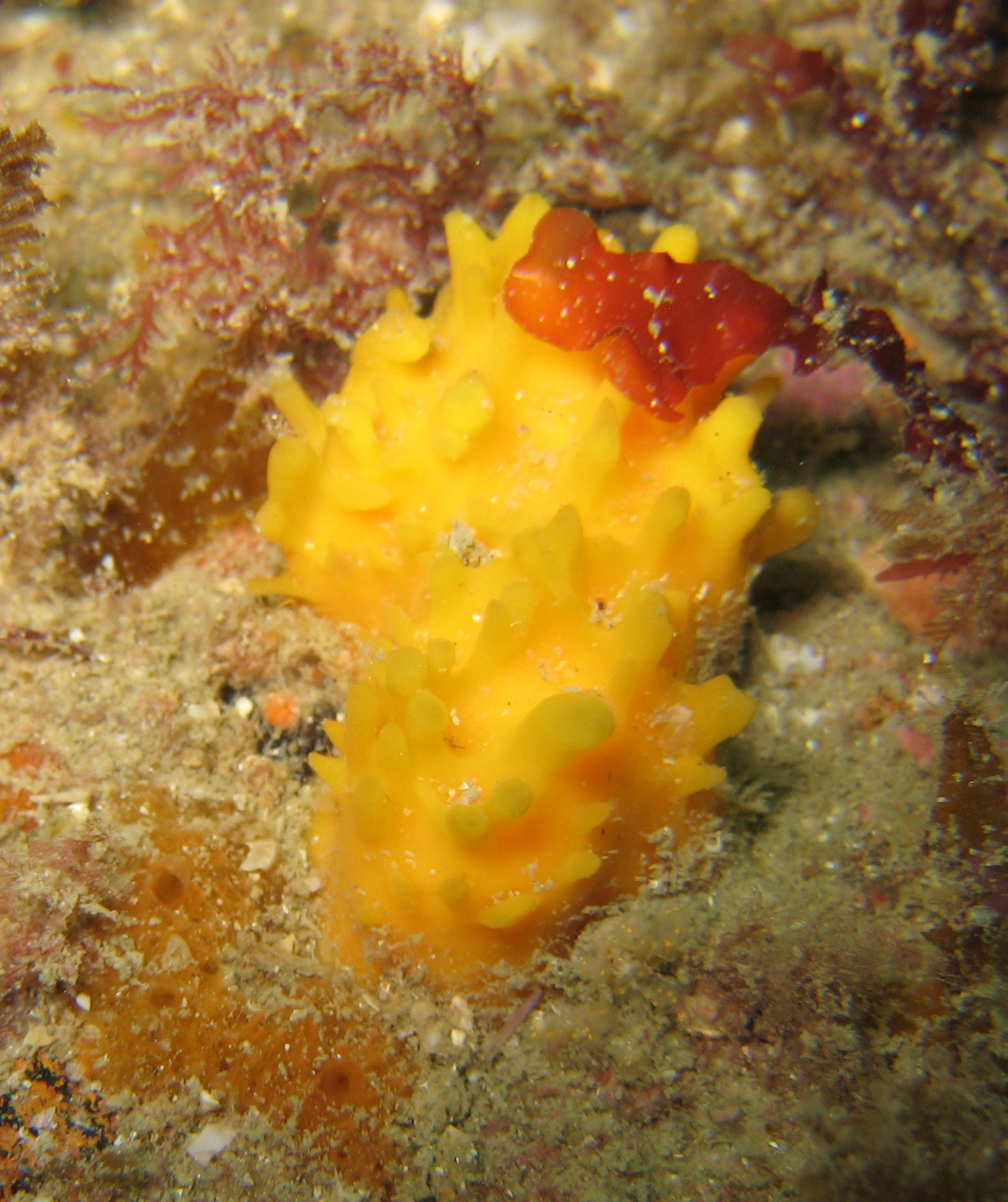
Polymastia boletiformis

- Polymastia agglutinans
- Polymastia boletiformis (yellow tit-sponge)
- Polymastia mamillaris
- Polymastia penicillus
- Polymastia spinula
- Quasillina brevis
- Sphaerotylus grey (B)
- Sphaerotylus spa

==== Family Suberitidae ====
- Terpios fugax
- Laxosuberites
- Protosuberites epiphytum
- Protosuberites incrustans
- Pseudosuberites sulphureus
- Suberites carnosus
- Suberites ficus
- Suberites pagurorum

==== Family Tethyidae ====
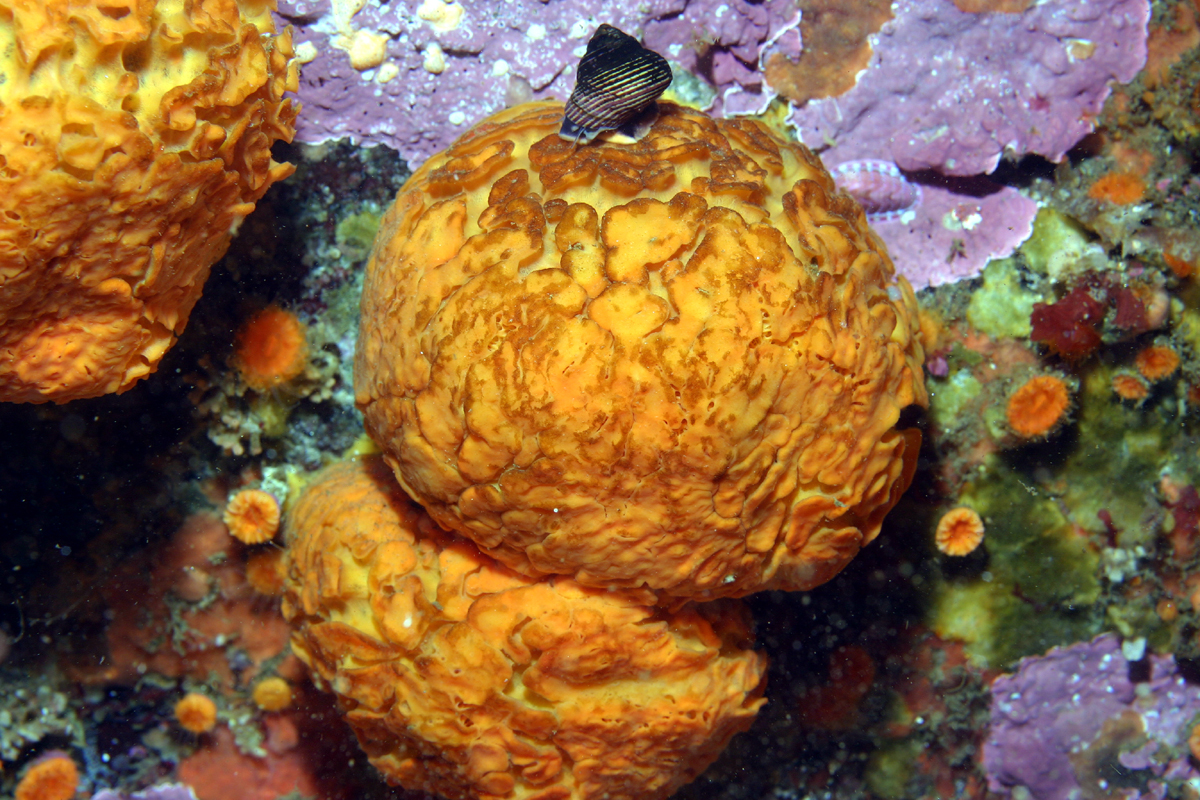
Tethya aurantium

- Tethya aurantium (golf ball sponge, orange puffball sponge)
- Tethya citrina
- Tethya hibernica
- Tethya norvegica

=== Order Halichondrida ===
==== Family Axinellidae ====
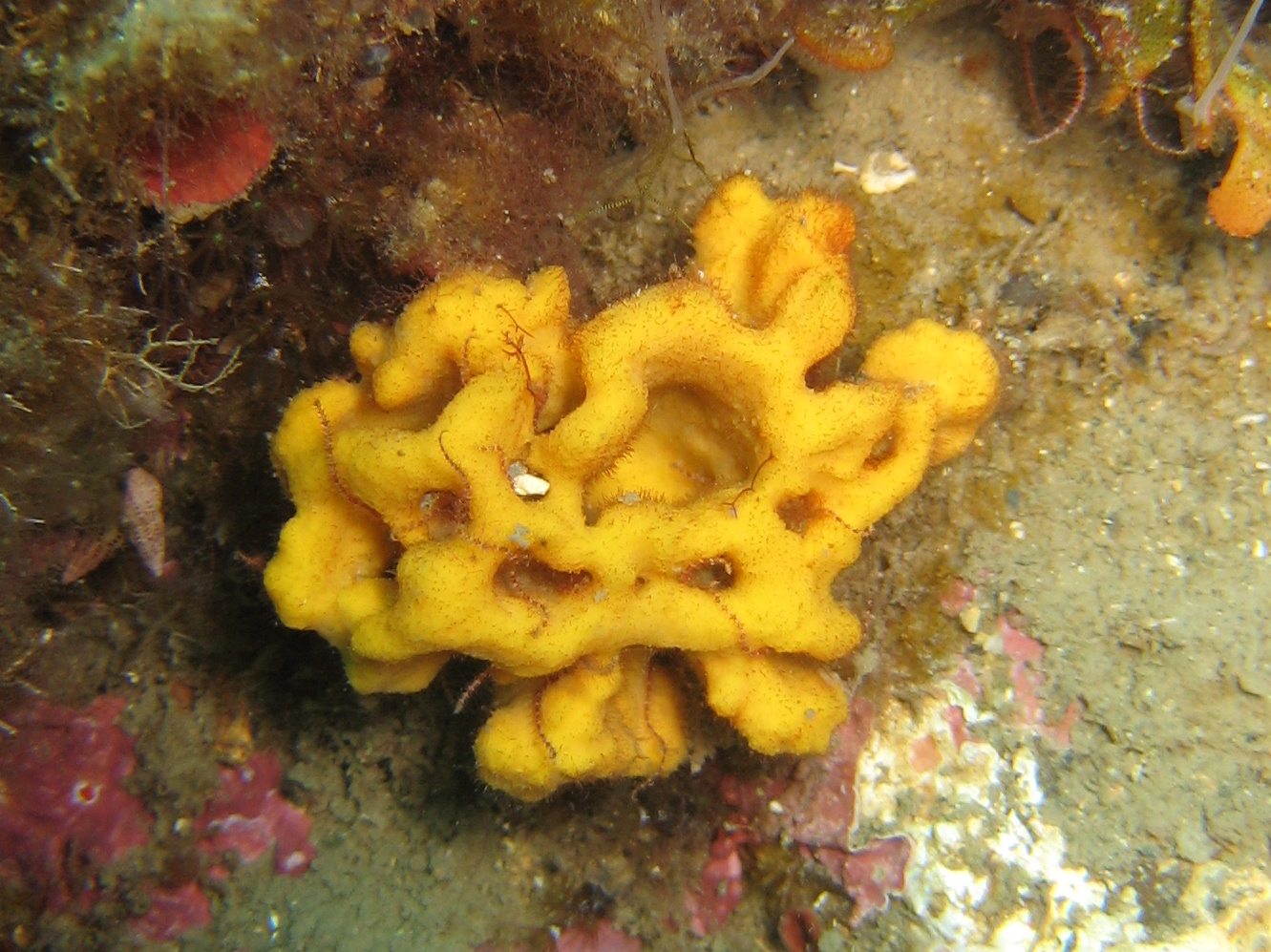
Axinella damicornis

- Axinella damicornis
- Axinella dissimilis
- Axinella flustra
- Axinella infundibuliformis
- Axinella parva
- Axinella pyramidata
- Axinella rugosa
- Phakellia ventilabrum (chalice sponge)

==== Family Halichondriidae ====
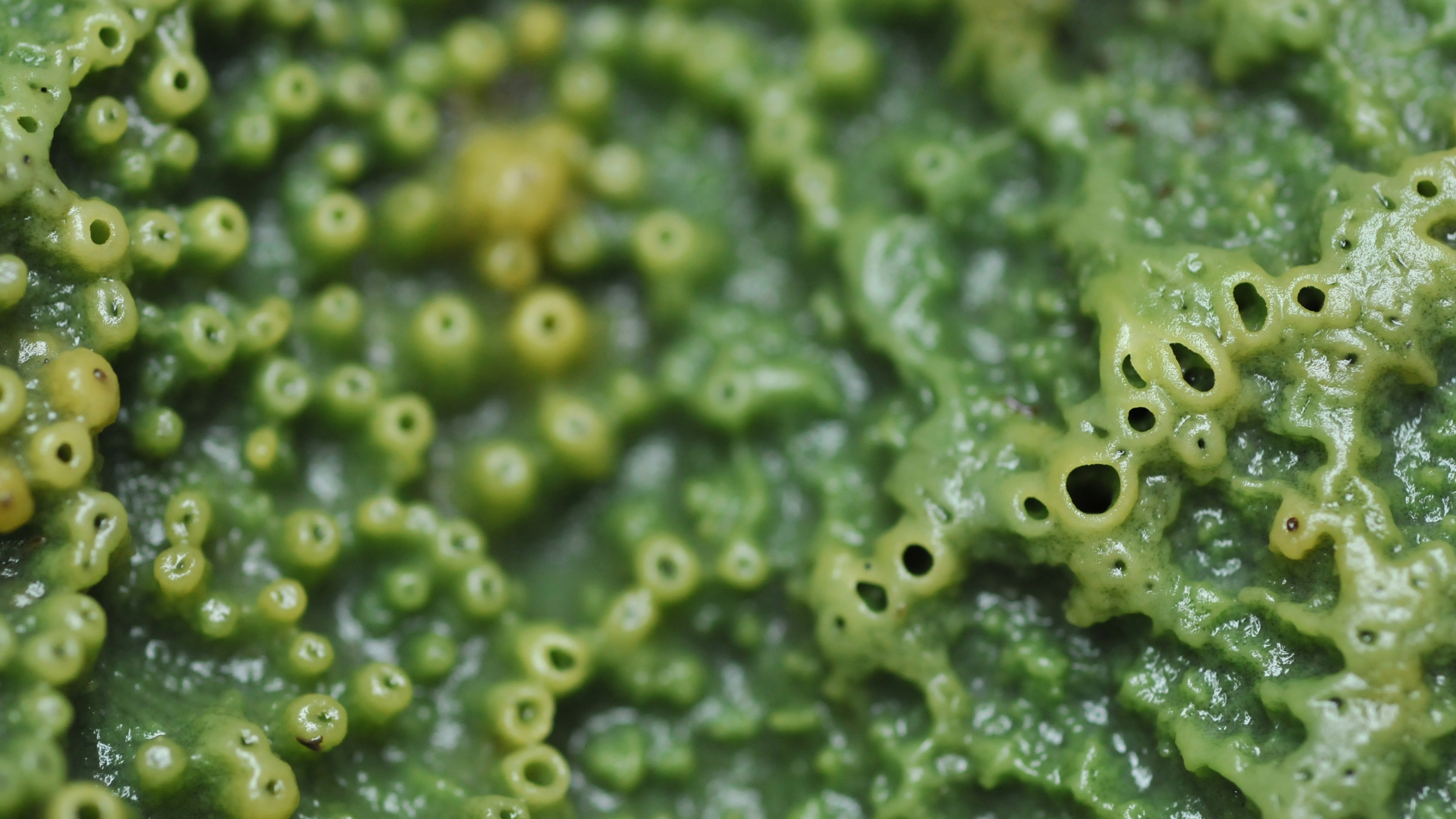
Closeup view of the breadcrumb sponge

- Halichondria bowerbanki (Bowerbank's halichondria)
- Halichondria panicea (breadcrumb sponge)
- Hymeniacidon kitchingi
- Hymeniacidon perlevis (crumb-of-bread sponge)
- Spongosorites calcicola

=== Order Haplosclerida ===
==== Family Chalinidae ====
- Chalinula limbata
- Haliclona cinerea
- Haliclona fistulosa
- Haliclona oculata (mermaid's glove)
- Haliclona simulans
- Haliclona urceolus
- Haliclona viscosa

=== Order Poecilosclerida ===
==== Family Acarnidae ====
- Iophon hyndmani
- Iophon nigricans

==== Family Coelosphaeridae ====
- Lissodendoryx jenjonesae

==== Family Crellidae ====
- Crella plana
- Crella rosea

==== Family Desmacellidae ====
- Biemna variantia
- Desmacella annexa

==== Family Esperiopsidae ====
- Amphilectus fucorum
- Amphilectus lobatus
- Esperiopsis
- Ulosa stuposa

==== Family Hymedesmiidae ====
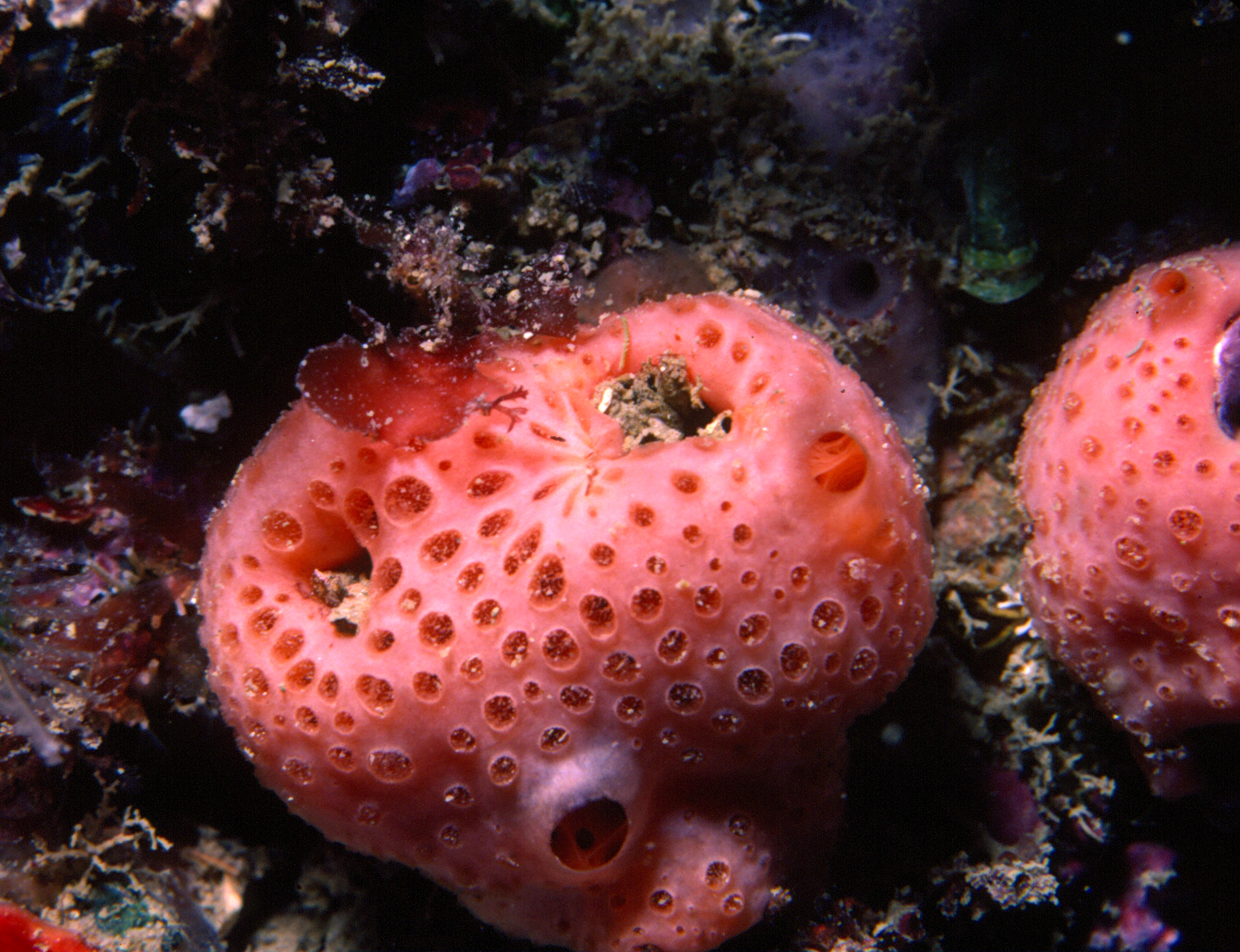
Hemimycale columella

- Hemimycale columella
- Hymedesmia cohesibacilla
- Hymedesmia coriacea
- Hymedesmia crami
- Hymedesmia cratera
- Hymedesmia hibernica
- Hymedesmia jecusculum
- Hymedesmia pansa
- Hymedesmia paupertas
- Hymedesmia peachi
- Hymedesmia primitiva
- Hymedesmia rathlinia
- Hymedesmia umbelliformis
- Phorbas fictitius
- Phorbas plumosus
- Phorbas punctatus
- Plocamiancora arndti
- Plocamionida ambigua
- Plocamionida tylotata
- Spanioplon armaturum
- Stylostichon

==== Family Microcionidae ====
- Antho brattegardi
- Antho coriacea
- Antho granditoxa
- Antho inconstans
- Antho involvens
- Clathria armata
- Clathria atrasanguinea
- Clathria barleei
- Clathria elliptichela
- Clathria fallax
- Clathria laevis
- Clathria spinarcus
- Clathria strepsitoxa
- Ophlitaspongia papilla

==== Family Mycalidae ====
- Mycale contarenii
- Mycale lingua
- Mycale macilenta
- Mycale minima
- Mycale rotalis
- Mycale subclavata

==== Family Myxillidae ====
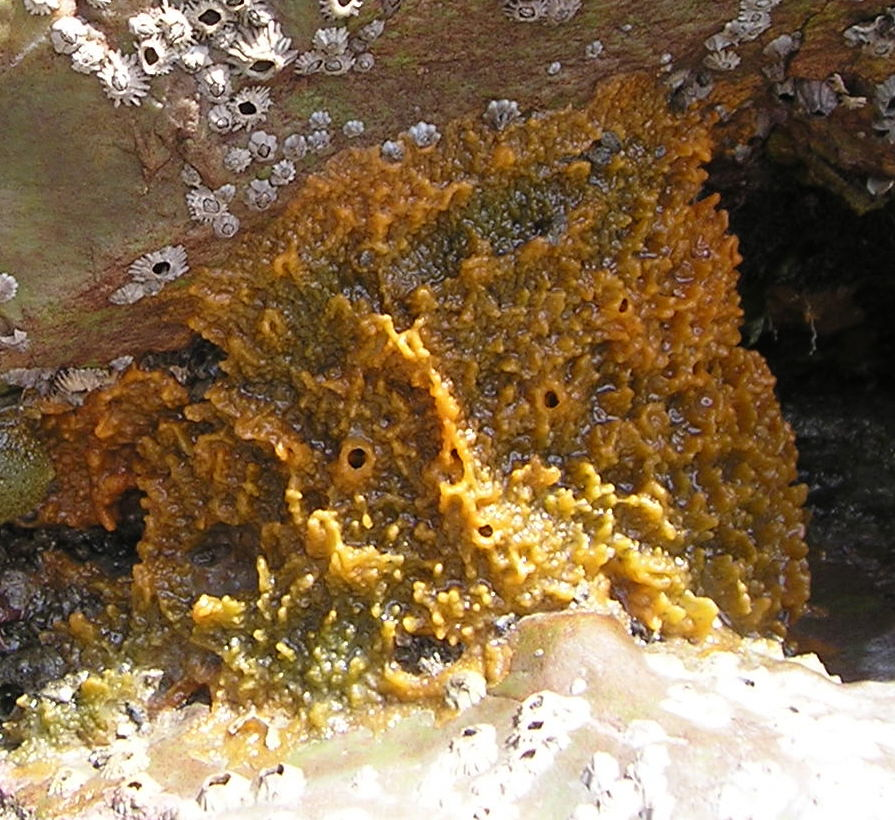
Myxilla incrustans

- Myxilla ancorata
- Myxilla fimbriata
- Myxilla incrustans
- Myxilla rosacea

=== Order Spirophorida ===
==== Family Tetillidae ====
- Craniella cranium
- Craniella zetlandica

=== Order Tetractinellida ===
==== Family Ancorinidae ====
- Dercitus bucklandi
- Stryphnus ponderosus
- Stelletta grubii

=== Order Verongiida ===
==== Family Ianthellidae ====
- Hexadella racovitzai

== Class Homoscleromorpha ==
=== Order Homosclerophorida ===
==== Family Oscarellidae ====
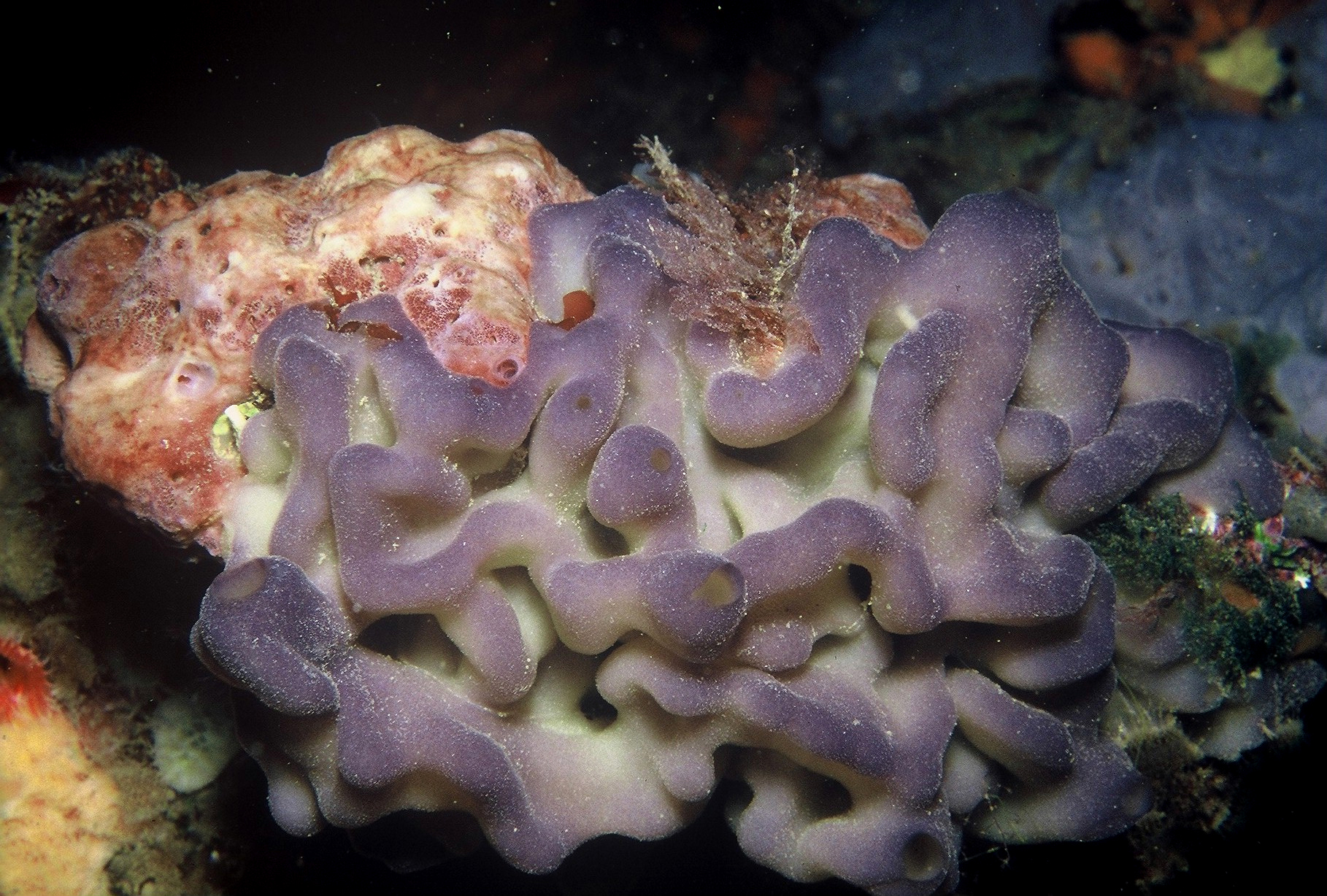
Oscarella lobularis

- Oscarella lobularis
- Oscarella rubra

==== Family Plakinidae ====
- Plakortis simplex
