= Sycyssa =

Scientific classification
- Kingdom: Animalia
- Phylum: Porifera
- Class: Calcarea
- Order: Leucosolenida
- Family: Lelapiidae
- Genus: Sycyssa; Haeckel, 1872
- Species: S. huxleyi

Binomial name
- Sycyssa huxleyi Haeckel, 1870

Genus of sponges

Sycyssa is a genus of calcareous sponges belonging to the family Lelapiidae. It is monotypic, containing a single species, Sycyssa huxley.
