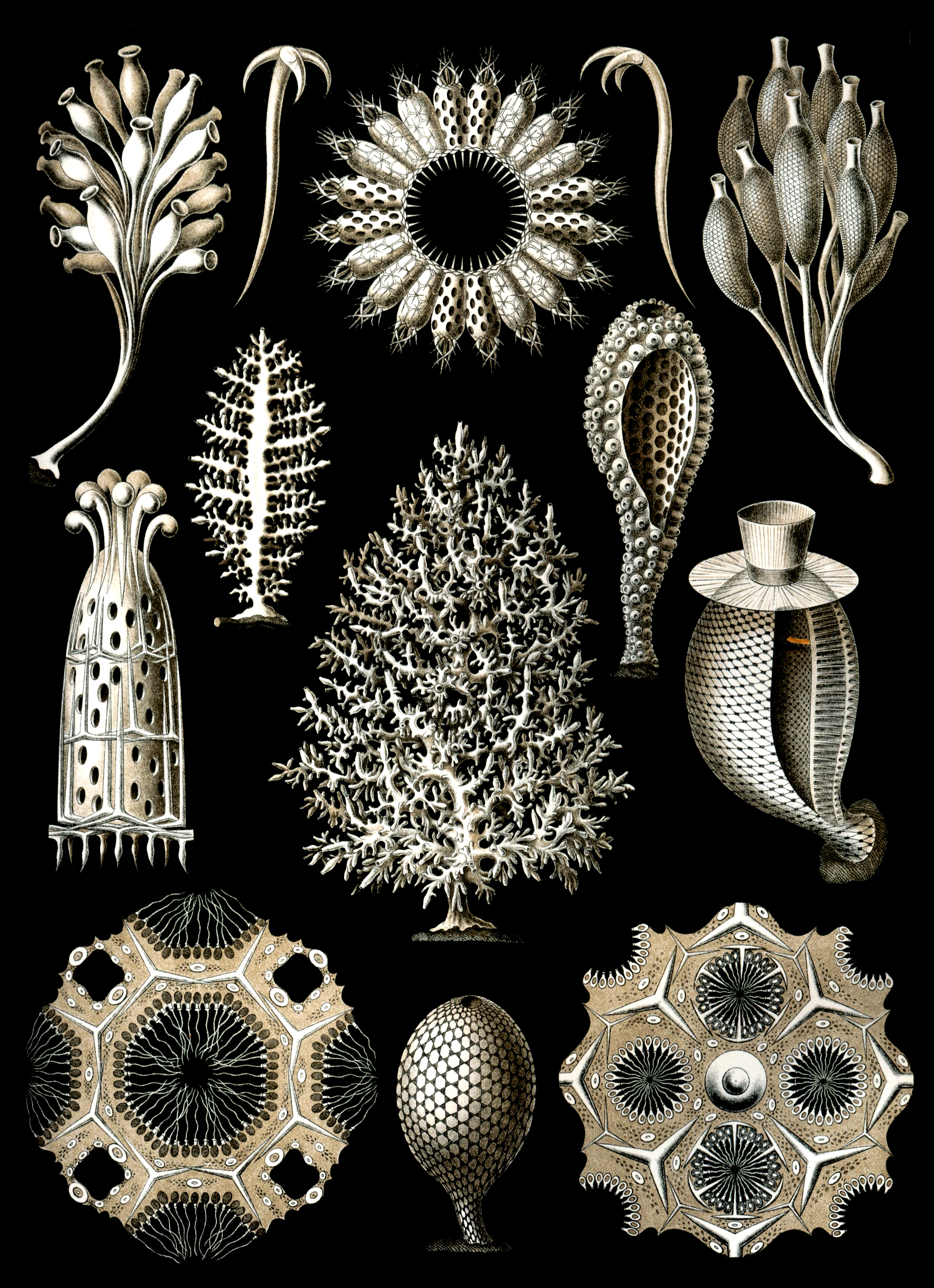
- bottom left of the picture: Sycarium elegans (Haeckel) = Sycon elegans (Bowerbank, 1845), lengthwise section of body wall

Scientific classification
- Kingdom: Animalia
- Phylum: Porifera
- Class: Calcarea
- Order: Leucosolenida
- Family: Sycettidae
- Genus: Sycon
- Species: S. elegans

Binomial name
- Sycon elegans (Bowerbank, 1845)

Synonyms
- Dunstervillia elegans Bowerbank, 1845; Dunstervillia lanzarotae Haeckel, 1870; Grantia tesselata Bowerbank, 1864; Scypha elegans (Bowerbank, 1845); Sycandra elegans (Bowerbank, 1845); Sycandra tabulatum Haeckel, 1872

= Sycon elegans =

Sycon elegans Temporal range: 357|0 Carboniferus-Recent

Species of sponge

Sycon elegans is a species of calcareous sponges belonging to the family Sycettidae.

== See also ==
- List of sponges of Ireland
