= Sycon faulkneri =

Scientific classification
- Kingdom: Animalia
- Phylum: Porifera
- Class: Calcarea
- Order: Leucosolenida
- Family: Sycettidae
- Genus: Sycon
- Species: S. faulkneri

Binomial name
- Sycon faulkneri Ilan, Gugel, Galil, Janussen, 2003

Species of sponge

Sycon faulkneri is a species of calcareous sponge belonging to the family Sycettidae.

This is a small tubular sponge (less than 1 cm) found on soft substrates in deep waters in the Eastern Mediterranean Sea. Despite its recent discovery, this appears to be a common species, distinctive from other Mediterranean Sycon by its small size and habitat.
