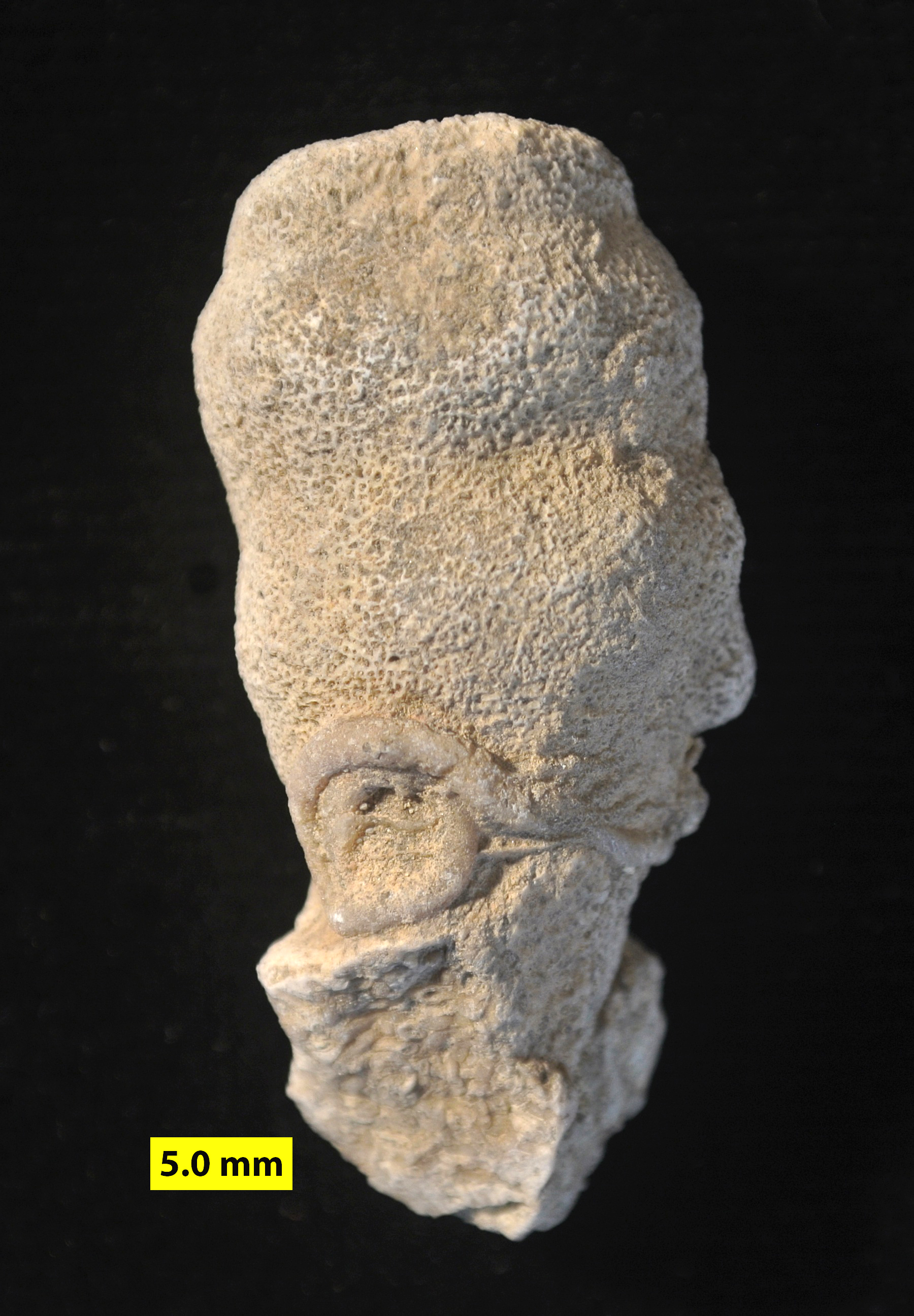
- Peronidella sp. (family Stellispongiidae) from the Middle Jurassic of Israel

Scientific classification
- Kingdom: Animalia
- Phylum: Porifera
- Class: Calcarea
- Subclass: Calcaronea
- Order: †Stellispongiida; Finks & Rigby, 2004

Subgroups
- see text.

= Stellispongiida =

Stellispongiida Temporal range: Permian–Miocene

Order of sponges

Stellispongiida is an order of calcareous sponges, most or all of which are extinct. Stellispongiids are one of several unrelated sponge groups described as "inozoans", a name referring to sponges with a hypermineralized calcitic skeleton independent from their spicules. Stellispongiids have a solid skeleton (without chambers) encasing calcite spicules arranged in trabeculae (column-like structures). "Inozoans" and the similar "sphinctozoans" were historically grouped together in the polyphyletic order Pharetronida.

Stellispongiids survived from the Permian to the Cenozoic, at least up to the Miocene Epoch. They comprised the majority of "inozoan" diversity in the Cretaceous Period, though their distribution was mostly restricted to Europe. The Treatise on Invertebrate Paleontology (2004) places the living sponge family Lelapiidae within Stellispongiida, though Systema Porifera (2002) places Lelapiidae within the order Leucosolenida.

== Subgroups ==
- Family †Endostomatidae Finks & Rigby, 2004 [Lower Triassic?–Eocene]
- Family Lelapiidae? Dendy & Row, 1913 [Holocene]
- Family †Stellispongiidae Laubenfels, 1955 [Permian–Miocene]
