= Sycon huinayense =

Scientific classification
- Kingdom: Animalia
- Phylum: Porifera
- Class: Calcarea
- Order: Leucosolenida
- Family: Sycettidae
- Genus: Sycon
- Species: S. huinayense

Binomial name
- Sycon huinayense Azevedo, Hajdu, Willenz & Klautau, 2009

Species of sponge

Sycon huinayense is a species of sponge found on light-exposed vertical substrates at depths of 6–10 m (20–33 ft). They are associated with the mussel species Mytilus chilensis. Members of the class Calcarea are hermaphroditic.

The type locality is Comau Fjord, Chile. It was named after Fundación San Ignácio del Huinay.

The zygote develops into either coeloblastula or amphiblastula larva (free-swimming) before settling down on a substrate where it grows into a young sponge. It is harmless to humans.
