= Ascute uteoides =

Scientific classification
- Domain: Eukaryota
- Kingdom: Animalia
- Phylum: Porifera
- Class: Calcarea
- Order: Leucosolenida
- Family: Leucosoleniidae
- Genus: Ascute
- Species: A. uteoides

Binomial name
- Ascute uteoides (Dendy, 1893)

Synonyms
- Leucosolenia uteoides Dendy, 1893

Species of sponge

Ascute uteoides is a species of calcareous sponge found in Australia.
