= Sycon yatsui =

Scientific classification
- Kingdom: Animalia
- Phylum: Porifera
- Class: Calcarea
- Order: Leucosolenida
- Family: Sycettidae
- Genus: Sycon
- Species: S. yatsui

Binomial name
- Sycon yatsui Hozawa, 1929

Species of sponge

Sycon yatsui is a species of calcareous sponge belonging to the family Sycettidae. The scientific name of the species was first published in 1929.
