= Ascute asconoides =

Scientific classification
- Kingdom: Animalia
- Phylum: Porifera
- Class: Calcarea
- Order: Leucosolenida
- Family: Leucosoleniidae
- Genus: Ascute
- Species: A. asconoides

Binomial name
- Ascute asconoides ( Carter, 1886)

Synonyms
- Aphroceras asconoides Carter, 1886; Leucosolenia asconoides (Carter, 1886)

Species of sponge

Ascute asconoides is a species of calcareous sponge found in Australia.
