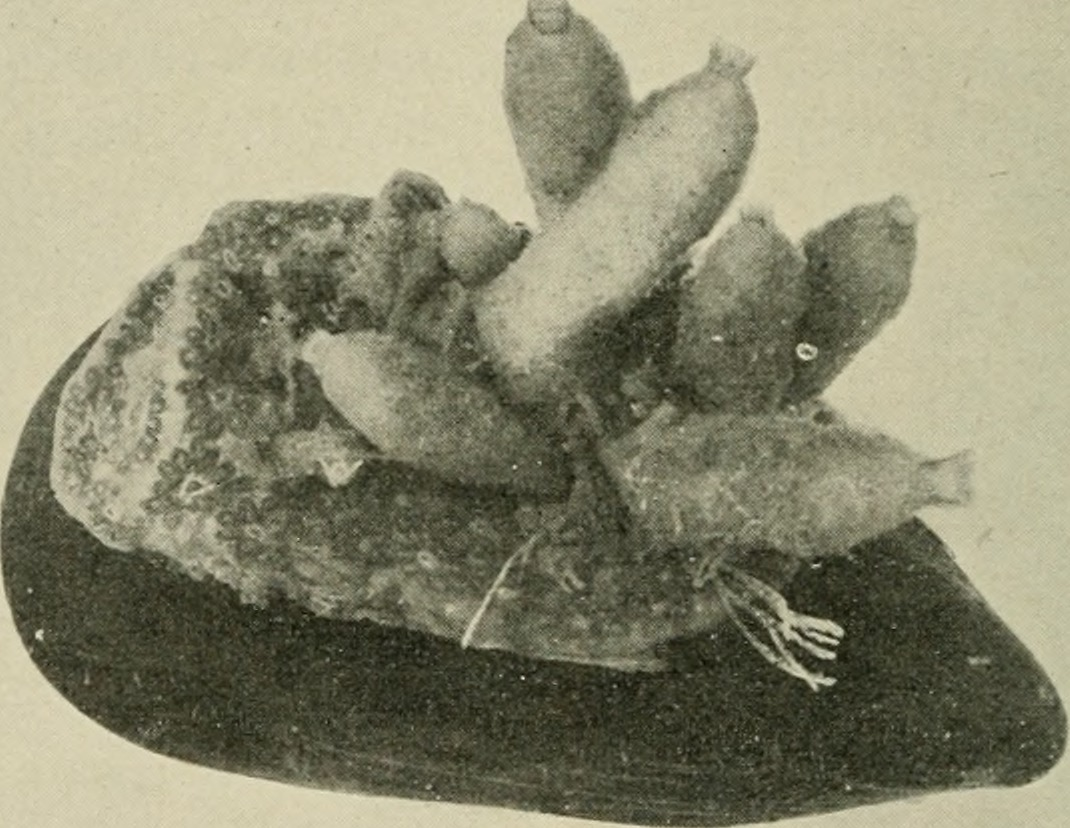
- Growing on a mussel shell

Scientific classification
- Kingdom: Animalia
- Phylum: Porifera
- Class: Calcarea
- Order: Leucosolenida
- Family: Sycettidae
- Genus: Sycon
- Species: S. ciliatum

Binomial name
- Sycon ciliatum (Fabricius, 1780)

Synonyms
- List: Grantia ciliatum (Fabricius, 1870); Scypha ciliata (Fabricius, 1780); Scypha coronata (Ellis & Solander, 1786); Spongia ciliata Fabricius, 1780; Spongia coronata Ellis & Solander, 1786; Spongia paniceum Esper, 1794; Sycandra ciliata (Fabricius, 1780); Sycandra ciliata var. lanceolata (Haeckel, 1872); Sycandra ciliata var. ovata (Haeckel, 1872)); Sycandra commutatum Haeckel, 1872; Sycandra coronata (Ellis & Solander, 1786); Sycocystis oviformis Haeckel, 1870; Sycodendrum ramosum Haeckel, 1870; Sycon coronatum (Ellis & Solander, 1786); Syconella tubulosum Haeckel, 1870; Sycum giganteum Haeckel, 1870; Sycum lanceolatum Haeckel, 1870; Sycum ovatum Haeckel, 1870

= Sycon ciliatum =

Species of sponge

Sycon ciliatum, the purse sponge, is a species of calcareous sponge belonging to the family Sycettidae.

== Description ==
This small purse sponge grows singly or in small groups from a single holdfast. It is up to five centimetres long, fairly stiff, greyish-white and spindle-shaped. The osculum at the tip is fringed with fine spicules. The surface of the sponge appears furry from its covering of fine papillae. The skeleton consists of a tangential layer of triactines and another of tetractines. This species can be distinguished from the rather similar Sycon raphanus by the fact that the choanocyte chambers are not fused but are free from each other.

== Distribution and habitat ==
Sycon ciliatum is common along the coasts of Europe and occurs on the eastern fringes of the Atlantic Ocean from Scandinavia south to Portugal. It is found low down on the shore and in the neritic zone, amongst seaweed, under stones or in rock pools in areas without strong wave action.
