= Polejaevia =

Scientific classification
- Kingdom: Animalia
- Phylum: Porifera
- Class: Calcarea
- Order: Leucosolenida
- Family: Jenkinidae
- Genus: Polejaevia; Borojevic, Boury-Esnault & Vacelet, 2000
- Species: P. telum

Binomial name
- Polejaevia telum (Lendenfeld, 1891)

Genus of sponges

Polejaevia is a genus of sponges belonging to the family Jenkinidae. The only species in this genus is Polejaevia telum (Lendenfeld, 1891).
