= Jenkina =

Scientific classification
- Domain: Eukaryota
- Kingdom: Animalia
- Phylum: Porifera
- Class: Calcarea
- Order: Leucosolenida
- Family: Jenkinidae
- Genus: Jenkina; Brøndsted, 1931

Genus of sponges

Jenkina is a genus of sponges belonging to the family Jenkinidae.

The species of this genus are found in Antarctica.

Species:

- Jenkina articulata Brøndsted, 1931
- Jenkina glabra Brøndsted, 1931
- Jenkina hiberna (Jenkin, 1908)
