= Grantiopsis =

Scientific classification
- Domain: Eukaryota
- Kingdom: Animalia
- Phylum: Porifera
- Class: Calcarea
- Order: Leucosolenida
- Family: Lelapiidae
- Genus: Grantiopsis; Dendy, 1893

Genus of sponges

Grantiopsis is a genus of calcareous sponges belonging to the family Lelapiidae.

Species:

- Grantiopsis cylindrica Dendy, 1893
- Grantiopsis fruticosa Dendy & Frederick, 1924
- Grantiopsis heroni Wörheide & Hooper, 2003
