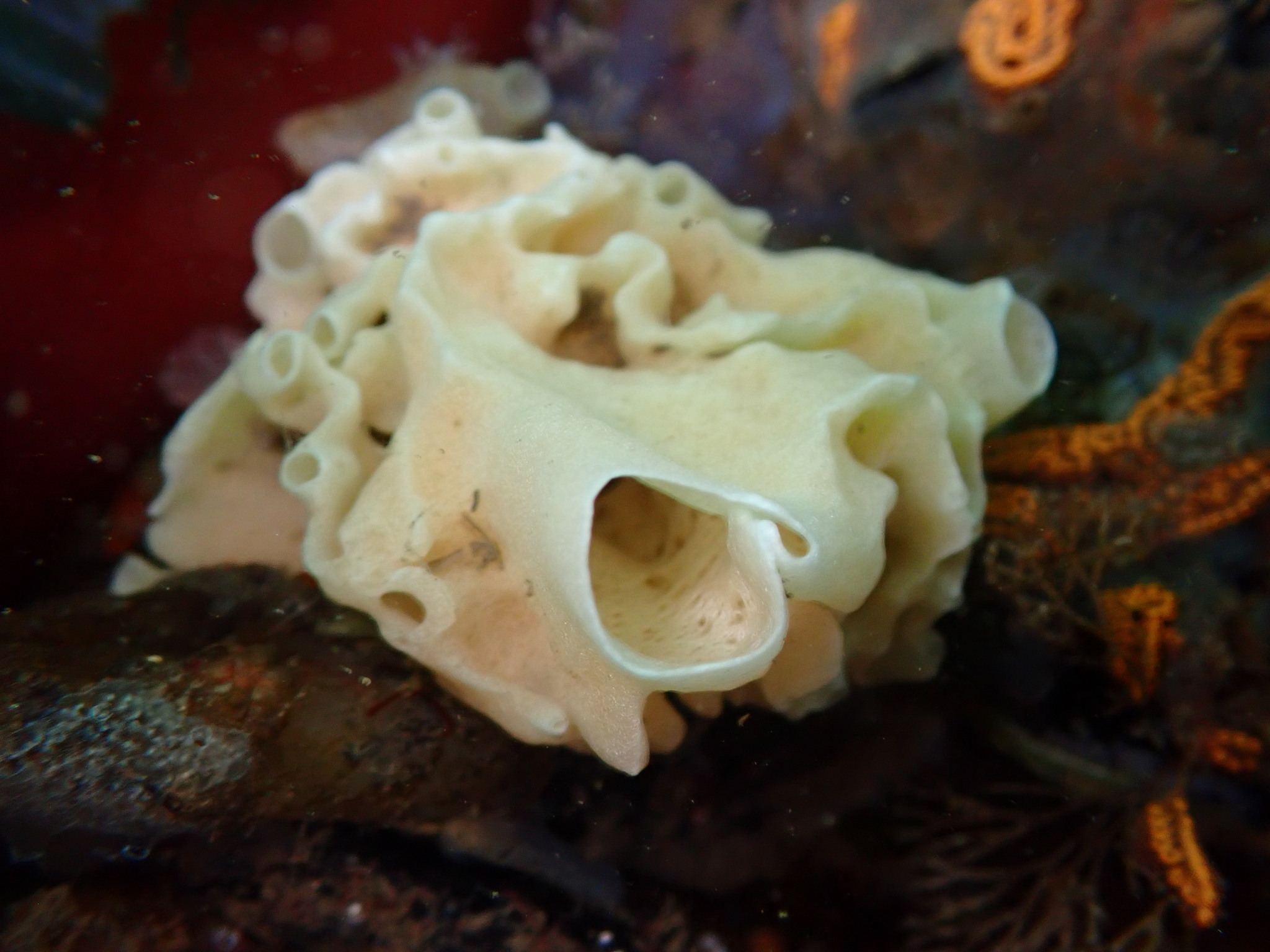
- Leucandra losangelensis (order Leucosolenida, family Grantiidae)

Scientific classification
- Kingdom: Animalia
- Phylum: Porifera
- Class: Calcarea
- Subclass: Calcaronea

Orders
- Baerida; Leucosolenida; Lithonida; †Sphaerocoeliida?; †Stellispongiida?

= Calcaronea =

Subclass of calcareous sponges

Calcaronea is a subclass of sea sponges in the class Calcarea, generally characterized by asymmetrical three-rayed (triactine) spicules, although some unusual specimens do have evenly-arranged rays. The nucleus of the choanocyte sits at the top of the cell (apinucleate) with the flagellum connected to it. Its larval form is a hollow ball of cells with an opening at one end, or stomoblastula, which eventually turns inside-out and forms a free-swimming, flagellated amphiblastula. Two-rayed (diactine) spicules are the first skeletal structures to develop as the sponge grows.
