= Paralelapia =

Scientific classification
- Domain: Eukaryota
- Kingdom: Animalia
- Phylum: Porifera
- Class: Calcarea
- Order: Leucosolenida
- Family: Lelapiidae
- Genus: Paralelapia; Hôzawa, 1923

Genus of sponges

Paralelapia is a genus of sponges belonging to the family Lelapiidae. The only species in this genus is Paralelapia nipponica (Hara, 1894).
