= Anamixilla =

Scientific classification
- Domain: Eukaryota
- Kingdom: Animalia
- Phylum: Porifera
- Class: Calcarea
- Order: Leucosolenida
- Family: Jenkinidae
- Genus: Anamixilla; Poléjaeff, 1883

Genus of sponges

Anamixilla is a genus of sponges belonging to the family Jenkinidae.

There are two species recognized in this genus:

- Anamixilla singaporensis Van Soest & De Voogd, 2015
- Anamixilla torresi Poléjaeff, 1883
