= Ascute =

Scientific classification
- Kingdom: Animalia
- Phylum: Porifera
- Class: Calcarea
- Order: Leucosolenida
- Family: Leucosoleniidae
- Genus: Ascute; Dendy & Row, 1913

Species
- See text

Genus of sponges

Ascute is a genus of calcareous sponges. It contains two species, both found in Australia:

- Ascute asconoides (Carter, 1886)
- Ascute uteoides (Dendy, 1893)
