= Leucascandra =

Scientific classification
- Kingdom: Animalia
- Phylum: Porifera
- Class: Calcarea
- Order: Leucosolenida
- Family: Jenkinidae
- Genus: Leucascandra; Borojevic & Klautau, 2000
- Species: L. caveolata

Binomial name
- Leucascandra caveolata Borojevic & Klautau, 2000

Genus of sponges

Leucascandra is a monotypic genus of sponges belonging to the family Jenkinidae. The only species in this genus is Leucascandra caveolata.
