= Lelapia =

Scientific classification
- Kingdom: Animalia
- Phylum: Porifera
- Class: Calcarea
- Order: Leucosolenida
- Family: Lelapiidae
- Genus: Lelapia; Gray, 1867

Genus of sponges

Lelapia is a genus of sponges belonging to the family Lelapiidae.

The species of this genus are found in Australia.

Species:

- Lelapia antiqua Dendy & Frederick, 1924
- Lelapia australis Gray, 1867
- Lelapia uteoides
