= Kebira =

Kebira may refer to:

- Kebira (sponge), a calcareous sponge genus
- Kebira Crater, in the Sahara desert
