= Uteopsis =

Scientific classification
- Kingdom: Animalia
- Phylum: Porifera
- Class: Calcarea
- Order: Leucosolenida
- Family: Jenkinidae
- Genus: Uteopsis; Dendy & Row, 1913
- Species: U. argentea

Binomial name
- Uteopsis argentea (Poléjaeff, 1883)

Genus of sponges

Uteopsis is a genus of sponges belonging to the family Jenkinidae. The only species in this genus is Uteopsis argentea.
