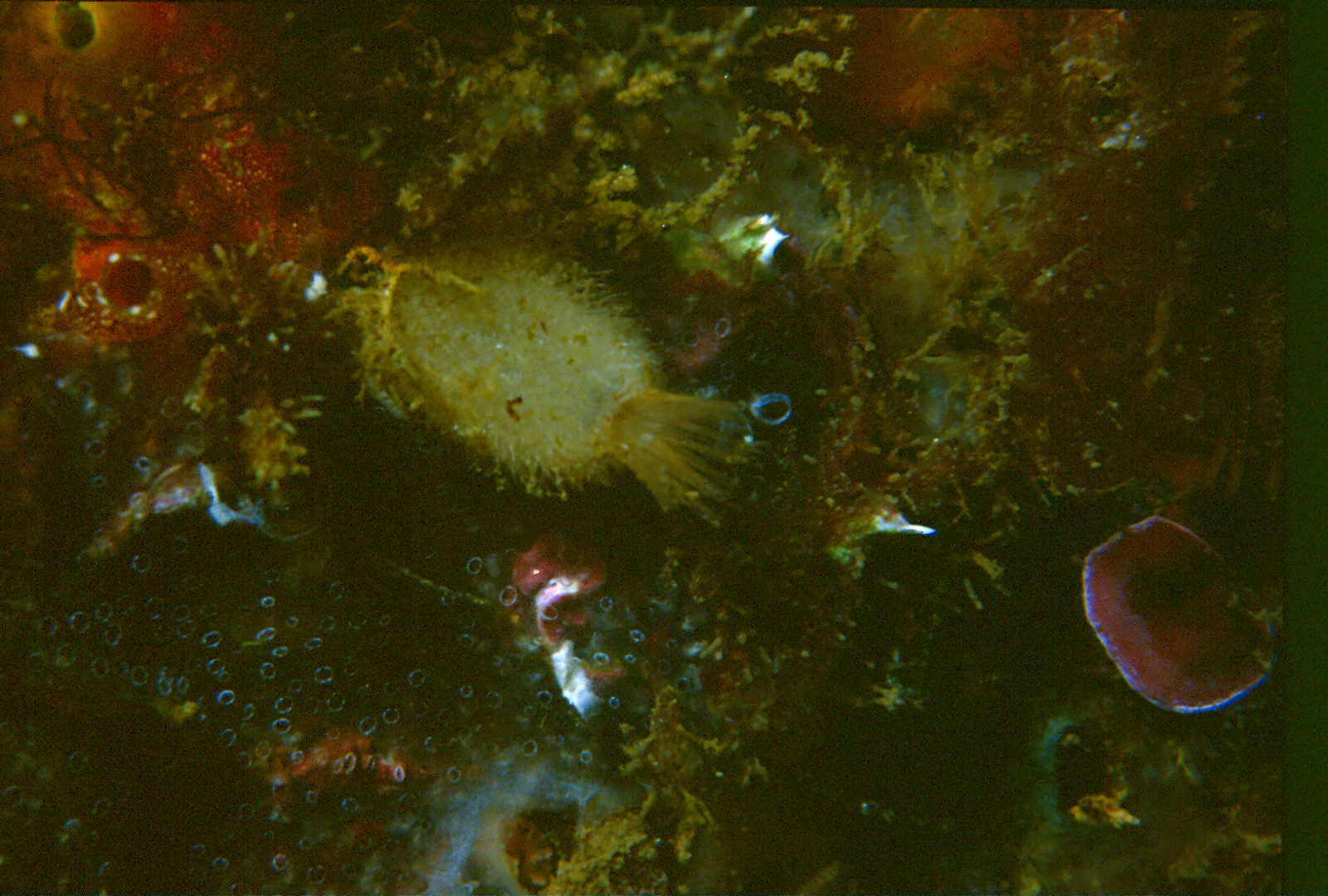

Scientific classification
- Kingdom: Animalia
- Phylum: Porifera
- Class: Calcarea
- Order: Leucosolenida
- Family: Sycettidae
- Genus: Sycon
- Species: S. raphanus

Binomial name
- Sycon raphanus Schmidt, 1862

Synonyms
- List: Scypha raphanus (Schmidt, 1862); Spongia inflata Della Chiaje, 1828; Sycandra raphanus (Schmidt, 1862); Sycandra tergestina Haeckel, 1872; Sycarium vesica Haeckel, 1870; Sycodendron procumbens Haeckel, 1870; Sycon raphanus var. aquariense Bidder, 1895; Sycum raphanus (Schmidt, 1862; Sycum raphanus var. tergestina Haeckel, 1872

= Sycon raphanus =

Species of sponge

Sycon raphanus is a species of marine invertebrate, a calcareous sponge belonging to the family Sycettidae. The name derives from the Greek, "raphanus", meaning radish, and presumably refers to the sponge's shape.

Sponges are composed of a jellylike mesohyl sandwiched between two layers of cells. They have a fragile skeleton composed of stiff spicules. They are filter feeders, maintaining a flow of water through their structure which passes out through large openings called oscula.

== Description ==
This small purse sponge grows singly and is globular in shape, sometimes with a short stalk. It is up to eight centimetres long and may be grey, yellowish or white. At the tip is an osculum fringed with long, upright spicules. The surface of the sponge is hairy and the consistency soft. The skeleton consists of both triactines and tetractines. This species closely resembles Sycon ciliatum but can be distinguished by the fact that the choanocyte chambers are fused.

== Distribution and habitat ==
Sycon raphanus is found along the western fringes of Europe including Norway, the Faroe Islands, western Ireland, France, Spain and the Mediterranean Sea. It is found low down on the shore and in the neritic zone down to about seventy metres, in caves, amongst seaweed, under stones, in rock pools and on vertical rockfaces.
