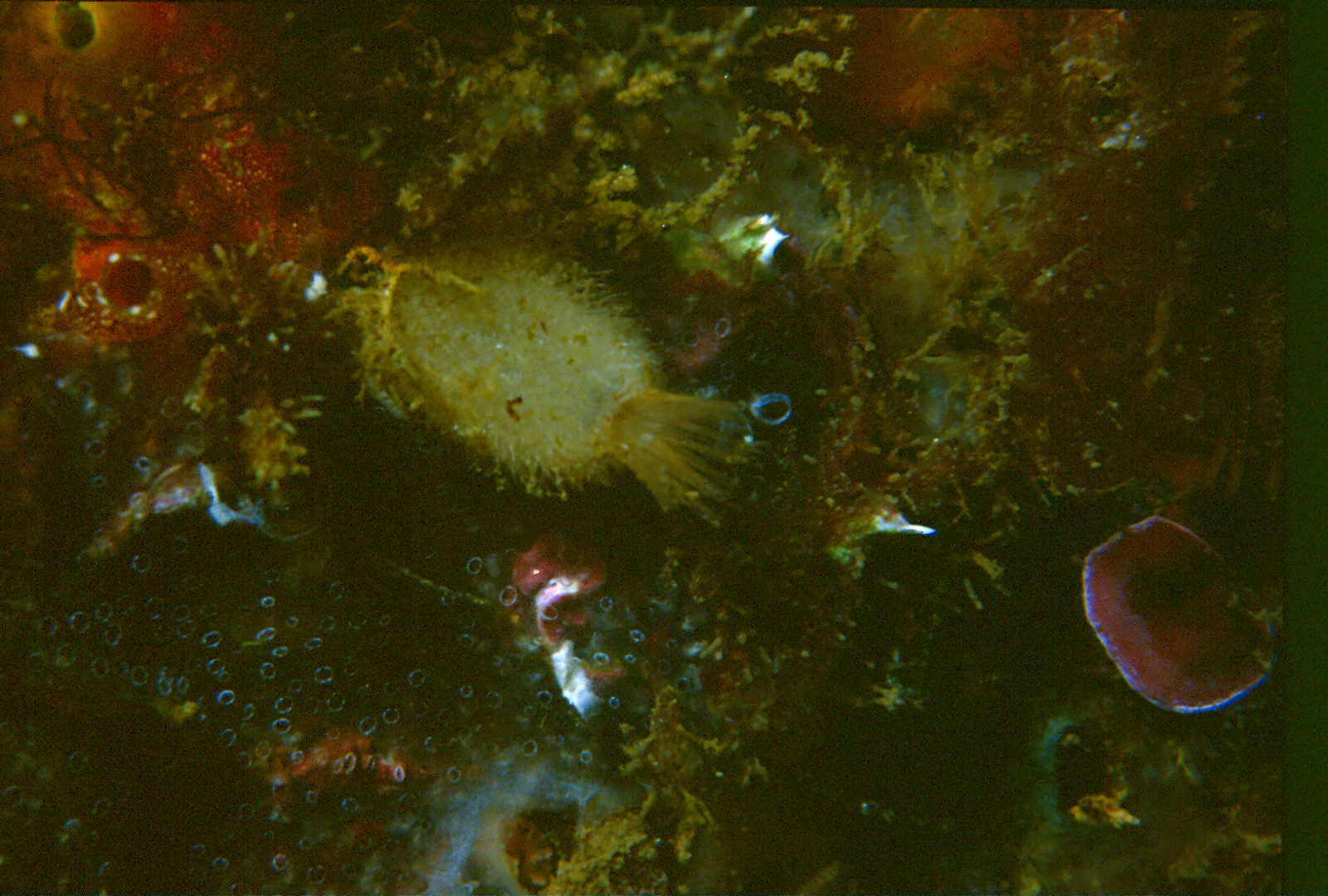
- Sycon raphanus

Scientific classification
- Domain: Eukaryota
- Kingdom: Animalia
- Phylum: Porifera
- Class: Calcarea
- Order: Leucosolenida
- Family: Sycettidae
- Genus: Sycon; Risso, 1826

Species
- See text

Synonyms
- List: Dunstervillia Bowerbank, 1845; Homoderma Lendenfeld, 1885; Leuckartea Haeckel, 1872; Scypha Gray, 1821; Streptoconus Jenkin, 1908; Sycarium Haeckel, 1869; Sycocystis Haeckel, 1870; Sycodendron Haeckel, 1870; Sycodendrum Haeckel, 1869; Syconella Schmidt, 1868; Sycortis Haeckel, 1872; Sycum Agassiz, 1846; Tenthrenodes Jenkin, 1908

= Sycon =

Genus of calcareous sponges in the family Sycettidae

Sycon is a genus of calcareous sponges belonging to the family Sycettidae. These sponges are small, growing up to 7.5 cm with a length from 2.5 to 7.5 cm, and are tube-shaped and often white to cream in colour. They are known to aquarium hobbyists as "Pineapple" or "Q-Tip" sponges, and are frequent "hitchhikers" accidentally brought in.

== Species ==
The following species are recognised in the genus Sycon:

- Sycon abyssale Borojevic & raat-Kleeton, 1965
- Sycon acanthoxea (Little, 1963)
- Sycon album Tanita, 1942
- Sycon ampulla (Haeckel, 1870)
- Sycon antarcticum (Jenkin, 1908)
- Sycon arcticum (Haeckel, 1870)
- Sycon australe (Jenkin, 1908)
- Sycon avus Chagas & Cavalcanti, 2017
- Sycon barbadense (Schuffner, 1877)
- Sycon bellum Chagas & Cavalcanti, 2017
- Sycon boreale (Schuffner, 1877)
- Sycon brasiliense Borojevic, 1971
- Sycon calcaravis Hozawa, 1929
- Sycon caminatum Thacker, 1908
- Sycon capricorn Wörheide & Hooper, 2003
- Sycon carteri Dendy, 1893
- Sycon ciliatum (Fabricius, 1780)
- Sycon coactum (Urban, 1906)
- Sycon compactum Lambe, 1893
- Sycon conulosum Cóndor-Luján, Louzada, Hajdu & Klautau, 2018
- Sycon cylindricum Tanita, 1942
- Sycon defendens Borojevic, 1967
- Sycon digitiforme Hozawa, 1929
- Sycon dunstervillia (Haeckel, 1872)
- Sycon eglintonense Lambe, 1900
- Sycon elegans (Bowerbank, 1845)
- Sycon ensiferum Dendy, 1893
- Sycon escanabense Duplessis & Reiswig, 2000
- Sycon faulkneri Ilan, Gugel, Galil & Janussen, 2003
- Sycon formosum (Haeckel, 1870)
- Sycon frustulosum Borojevic & Peixinho, 1976
- Sycon gelatinosum (Blainville, 1834)
- Sycon giganteum Dendy, 1893
- Sycon globulatum Hozawa, 1929
- Sycon grantioides Dendy, 1916
- Sycon helleri (Lendenfeld, 1891)
- Sycon hozawai Breitfuss, 1932
- Sycon huinayense Azevedo, Hajdu, Willenz & Klautau, 2009
- Sycon humboldti Risso, 1826 type species
- Sycon inconspicuum (Lendenfeld, 1885)
- Sycon incrustans Breitfuss, 1898
- Sycon karajakense Breitfuss, 1897
- Sycon kerguelense Urban, 1908
- Sycon lambei Dendy & Row, 1913
- Sycon lendenfeldi Row & Hozawa, 1932
- Sycon lingua (Haeckel, 1870)
- Sycon lunulatum (Haeckel, 1872)
- Sycon luteolum Tanita, 1942
- Sycon magnapicale Cóndor-Luján, Louzada, Hajdu & Klautau, 2018
- Sycon matsushimense Tanita, 1940
- Sycon mexico Hozawa, 1940
- Sycon minutum Dendy, 1893
- Sycon misakiense Hozawa, 1929
- Sycon mundulum Lambe, 1900
- Sycon munitum Jenkin, 1908
- Sycon natalense Borojevic, 1967
- Sycon okadai Hozawa, 1929
- Sycon ornatum Kirk, 1898
- Sycon oscari Van Soest & De Voogd, 2018
- Sycon parvulum (Preiwisch, 1904)
- Sycon pedicellatum Kirk, 1911
- Sycon pentactinalis Rossi, Farina, Borojevic & Klautau, 2006
- Sycon plumosum Tanita, 1943
- Sycon proboscideum Breitfuss, 1898
- Sycon proboscideum (Haeckel, 1870)
- Sycon protectum Lambe, 1896
- Sycon pulchrum Tanita, 1943
- Sycon quadrangulatum (Schmidt, 1868)
- Sycon ramsayi (Lendenfeld, 1885)
- Sycon raphanus Schmidt, 1862
- Sycon rotundum Tanita, 1941
- Sycon satsumense Hozawa, 1929
- Sycon scaldiense (Van Koolwijk, 1982)
- Sycon schmidti (Haeckel, 1872)
- Sycon schuffneri Dendy & Row, 1913
- Sycon setosum Schmidt, 1862
- Sycon simushirense Hozawa, 1918
- Sycon stauriferum (Preiwisch, 1904)
- Sycon subhispidum (Carter, 1886)
- Sycon sycandra (Lendenfeld, 1895)
- Sycon tuba Lendenfeld, 1891
- Sycon urugamii Tanita, 1940
- Sycon verum Row & Hozawa, 1931
- Sycon vigilans Sarà & Gaino, 1971
- Sycon villosum (Haeckel, 1870)
- Sycon yatsui Hozawa, 1929
