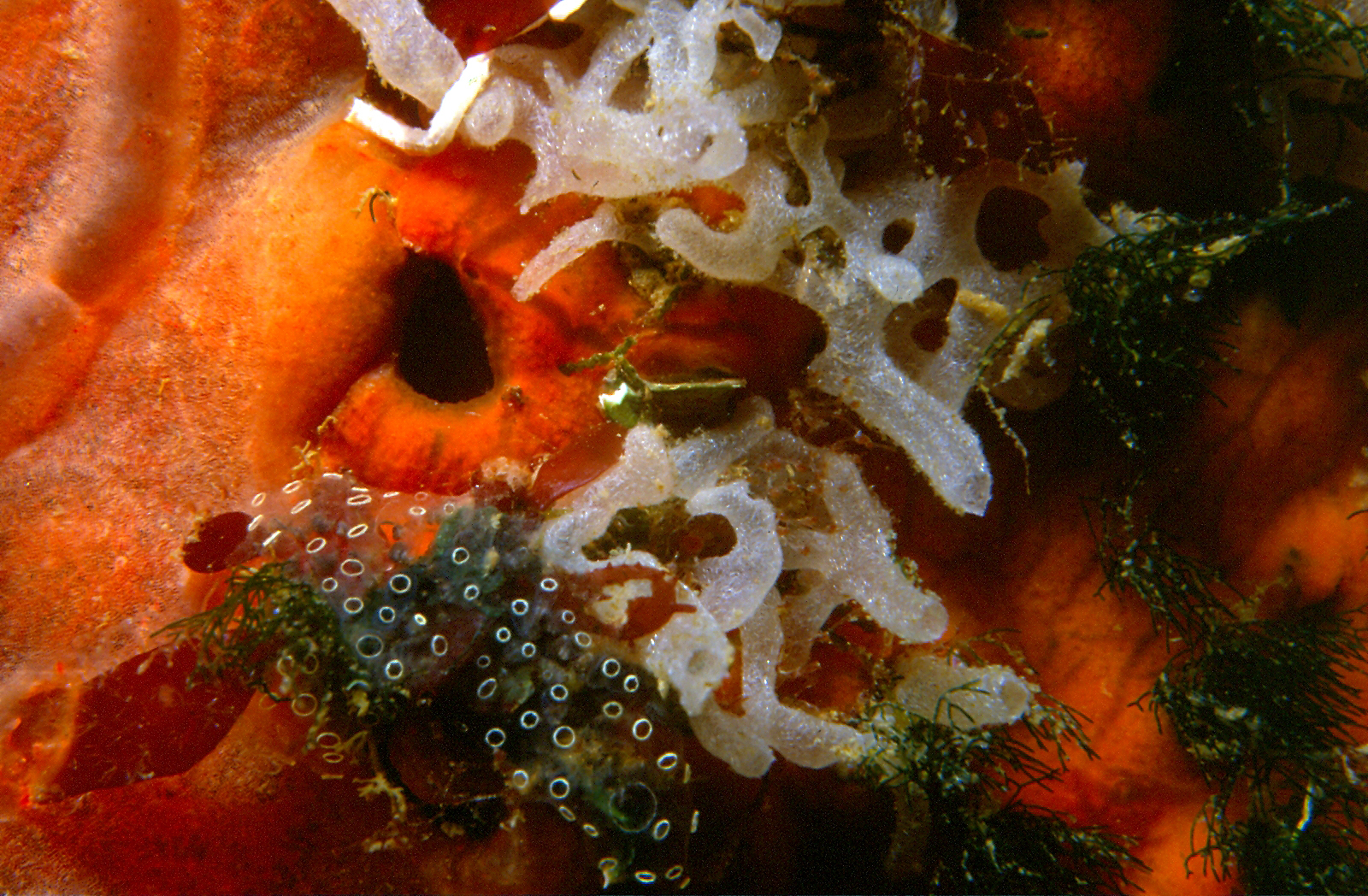
- Leucosolenia variabilis

Scientific classification
- Domain: Eukaryota
- Kingdom: Animalia
- Phylum: Porifera
- Class: Calcarea
- Order: Leucosolenida
- Family: Leucosoleniidae
- Genus: Leucosolenia; Bowerbank, 1861

Species
- See text

Synonyms
- Ascortis Haeckel, 1872; Asculmis Haeckel, 1872; Ascuris Haeckel, 1872; Clistolynthus Haeckel, 1870; Nardopsis Haeckel, 1870; Olynthus Haeckel, 1869; Tarrus Haeckel, 1869

= Leucosolenia =

Genus of calcareous sponges in the family Leucosoleniidae

Leucosolenia is a genus of calcareous sponges belonging to the family Leucosoleniidae. Species of this genus usually appear as groups of curved vases, up to 2 cm long, each ending in an osculum. The overall shape is sometimes likened to a tiny bunch of bananas. They are most often observed in tide pools, clustered around the base of seaweeds or on rocks, and occur in a variety of colours, usually rather pale. Its canal system is of asconoid type. The colony consists of few simple vase-like, cylindrical individuals each terminating in an osculum and united at their bases by irregular horizontal tubes. Leucosolenia reproduces both asexually and sexually. asexual reproduction by budding and sexual reproduction takes place by formation of gametes, i.e., ova and sperms. Lecosolenia is hermaphrodite, because both the gametes are formed in the body of same individual. Sponges are mostly asymmetrical, but Leucosolenia is symmetrical.

== Species ==
The following species are recognised in the genus Leucosolenia:

- Leucosolenia aboralis Brøndsted, 1931
- Leucosolenia albatrossi Hôzawa, 1918
- Leucosolenia arachnoides (Haeckel, 1872)
- Leucosolenia australis Brøndsted, 1931
- Leucosolenia botryoides (Ellis & Solander, 1786)
- Leucosolenia brondstedi Van Soest & Hooper, 2020
- Leucosolenia cervicornis (Haeckel, 1872)
- Leucosolenia clarkii (Verrill, 1873)
- Leucosolenia complicata (Montagu, 1814)
- Leucosolenia corallorrhiza (Haeckel, 1872)
- Leucosolenia cyathus (Haeckel, 1870)
- Leucosolenia discoveryi Jenkin, 1908
- Leucosolenia echinata Kirk, 1893
- Leucosolenia eleanor Urban, 1906
- Leucosolenia eustephana Haeckel, 1872
- Leucosolenia falklandica Breitfuss, 1898
- Leucosolenia feuerlandica Tanita, 1942
- Leucosolenia fragilis (Haeckel, 1870)
- Leucosolenia gegenbauri (Haeckel, 1870)
- Leucosolenia goethei (Haeckel, 1870)
- Leucosolenia hispidissima (Haeckel, 1872)
- Leucosolenia horrida (Schmidt in Haeckel, 1872)
- Leucosolenia incerta Urban, 1908
- Leucosolenia kagoshimensis (Hozawa, 1929)
- Leucosolenia lucasi Dendy, 1891
- Leucosolenia macquariensis Dendy, 1918
- Leucosolenia microspinata Longo, 2009
- Leucosolenia minchini Jenkin, 1908
- Leucosolenia minuta Tanita, 1943
- Leucosolenia mollis Tanita, 1941
- Leucosolenia nautilia de Laubenfels, 1930
- Leucosolenia parthenopea Sarà, 1953
- Leucosolenia pilosella Brøndsted, 1931
- Leucosolenia pyriformis Tanita, 1943
- Leucosolenia rosea Kirk, 1896
- Leucosolenia salpinx Van Soest, 2017
- Leucosolenia serica Tanita, 1942
- Leucosolenia somesii (Bowerbank, 1874)
- Leucosolenia tenera Tanita, 1940
- Leucosolenia variabilis Haeckel, 1870
- Leucosolenia ventosa Hôzawa, 1940
- Leucosolenia vesicula (Haeckel, 1870)
