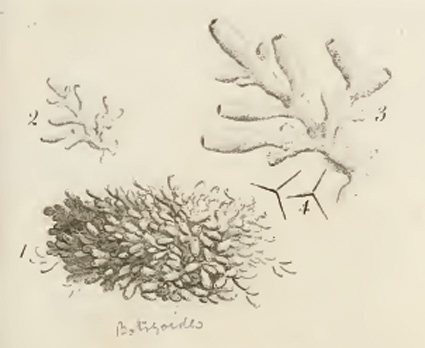

Conservation status
- Secure (NatureServe)

Scientific classification
- Kingdom: Animalia
- Phylum: Porifera
- Class: Calcarea
- Order: Leucosolenida
- Family: Leucosoleniidae
- Genus: Leucosolenia
- Species: L. botryoides

Binomial name
- Leucosolenia botryoides (Ellis & Solander, 1786)

= Orange pipe sponge =

Species of sponge

The orange pipe sponge, sometimes referred to as the orange pipe calcerous sponge or Leucosolenia botryoides, is a soft, white sponge with a tubular branching structure. The name is derived from the Greek word, "botrys", which means "cluster of grapes", relating to the branched structure of the sponge. It was originally found and named Spongia botryoides and given the common name "grape sponge" by researchers John Ellis and Daniel Charles Solander in 1786 before it was discovered to be a part of the genus Leucosolenia and changed to the orange pipe sponge. In Ellis and Solander's discovery, they described the sponge as "tender and branched as in bunches" where the "bunches are hollow." It is considered an asconoid sponge because it has no definitive shape.

== Distribution ==
Leucosolenia botryoides is found within the North Atlantic Ocean, more commonly on the coasts of Britain and Ireland. It also can be found from the North of Norway to the Mediterranean Coast. It is generally found within the Northern Atlantic Ocean on shady rocky areas and caves in tidepools and shallow sub-intertidal waters. It has been found at latitudes as high as 60.85 degrees and as low as 32.41 degrees and at longitudes as high as 7.01 degrees and as low as -79.83 degrees. In some instances, L. botryoides is found living with various species of algae and hydroids such as fucus, corallina, and polysiphonia. It prefers very shallow water depths, anywhere between the range of 3 to 43 meters and flourishes best in ocean salinity levels ranging between 34 and 36 PSU (practical salinity units).

== Habitat and ecology ==
The orange pipe sponge is a benthic organism, meaning it typically dwells at the bottom of the body of water it is occupying. As stated above, it's been found to occupy depths ranging anywhere from 3 to 43 meters and prefers temperatures of 2 °C to 23 °C, which is why it is mostly found in shallow waters not far off the coast of colder countries, like Canada and Ireland. When it comes to water oxygen saturation, the Orange Pipe Sponge has been found to live in waters between 97.339% oxygen saturation and 105.854% oxygen saturation. In terms of salinity for the Orange Pipe Sponge, the minimum PSU, or practical salinity units, it has been found out has been 34.219 and the maximum has been 36.080. When it comes to feeding, the Orange Pipe Sponge is a suspension feeder that typically preys on phytoplankton suspended in the water column. The inner ciliated layer of this sponge is found to be monoflagellate, with a mouth at its base.

=== Locomotion and contraction ===
In a 2013 study, it was noted that the sponge appears to use spicules as a way to anchor down as well as propel itself. These sponges are also known to contract to initiate changes in internal flow, which is why debris clouds are observed coming from the osculum during contraction. It also has been noted that slower contractions could be used to deter potential predators and parasites from crawling on the sponge.

== Morphology ==
Leucosolenia botryoides is a soft, white calcareous sponge that has a base which grows proximal branching tube-like structures approximately 2 centimeters tall and 2 centimeters wide. The branched morphology is comparable to the Leucosolenia variabilis, but the L. variabilis is larger in proportion to length and are clustered less densely. The tops of the tube structures of the sponge open to an osculum, where the waste products of the sponge get pumped through. The body of the L. botryoides is composed of three and four pointed calcareous spicules as means of structure and protection from predators and the exterior of the sponge has micro-hairs.

=== Reproduction ===
Leucosolenia botryoides is a protogynous hermaphrodite, much like other sponges in the Calcarea class. They typically reproduce during summer and fall.
