= Sycanthidae =

Scientific classification
- Kingdom: Animalia
- Phylum: Porifera
- Class: Calcarea
- Order: Leucosolenida
- Family: Sycanthidae; Lendenfeld, 1891

Genera
- Dermatetron Jenkin, 1908; Sycantha Lendenfeld, 1891

Family of sponges

Sycanthidae is a family of calcareous sponges in the order Leucosolenida.
