= Achramorphidae =

Scientific classification
- Kingdom: Animalia
- Phylum: Porifera
- Class: Calcarea
- Order: Leucosolenida
- Family: Achramorphidae; Borojevic, Boury-Esnault, Manuel & Vacelet, 2002

Genera
- Achramorpha Jenkin, 1908; Megapogon Jenkin, 1908

Synonyms
- Staurorrhaphidae Jenkin, 1908

Family of sponges

Achramorphidae is a family of calcareous sponges in the order Leucosolenida.
