= Jenkinidae =

Scientific classification
- Kingdom: Animalia
- Phylum: Porifera
- Class: Calcarea
- Order: Leucosolenida
- Family: Jenkinidae; Borojevic, Boury-Esnault & Vacelet, 2000

Genera
- Anamixilla Poléjaeff, 1883; Jenkina Brøndsted, 1931; Leucascandra Borojevic & Klautau, 2000; Polejaevia Borojevic, Boury-Esnault & Vacelet, 2000; Uteopsis Dendy & Row, 1913

Family of sponges

Jenkinidae is a family of sea sponges in the order Leucosolenida.
