= Kebira (sponge) =

Scientific classification
- Kingdom: Animalia
- Phylum: Porifera
- Class: Calcarea
- Order: Leucosolenida
- Family: Lelapiidae
- Genus: Kebira; Row, 1909

Genus of sponges

Kebira is a genus of sponges belonging to the family Lelapiidae.

The species of this genus are found in Southern Africa.

Species:

- Kebira tetractinifera Van Soest & De Voogd, 2018
- Kebira uteoides Row, 1909
