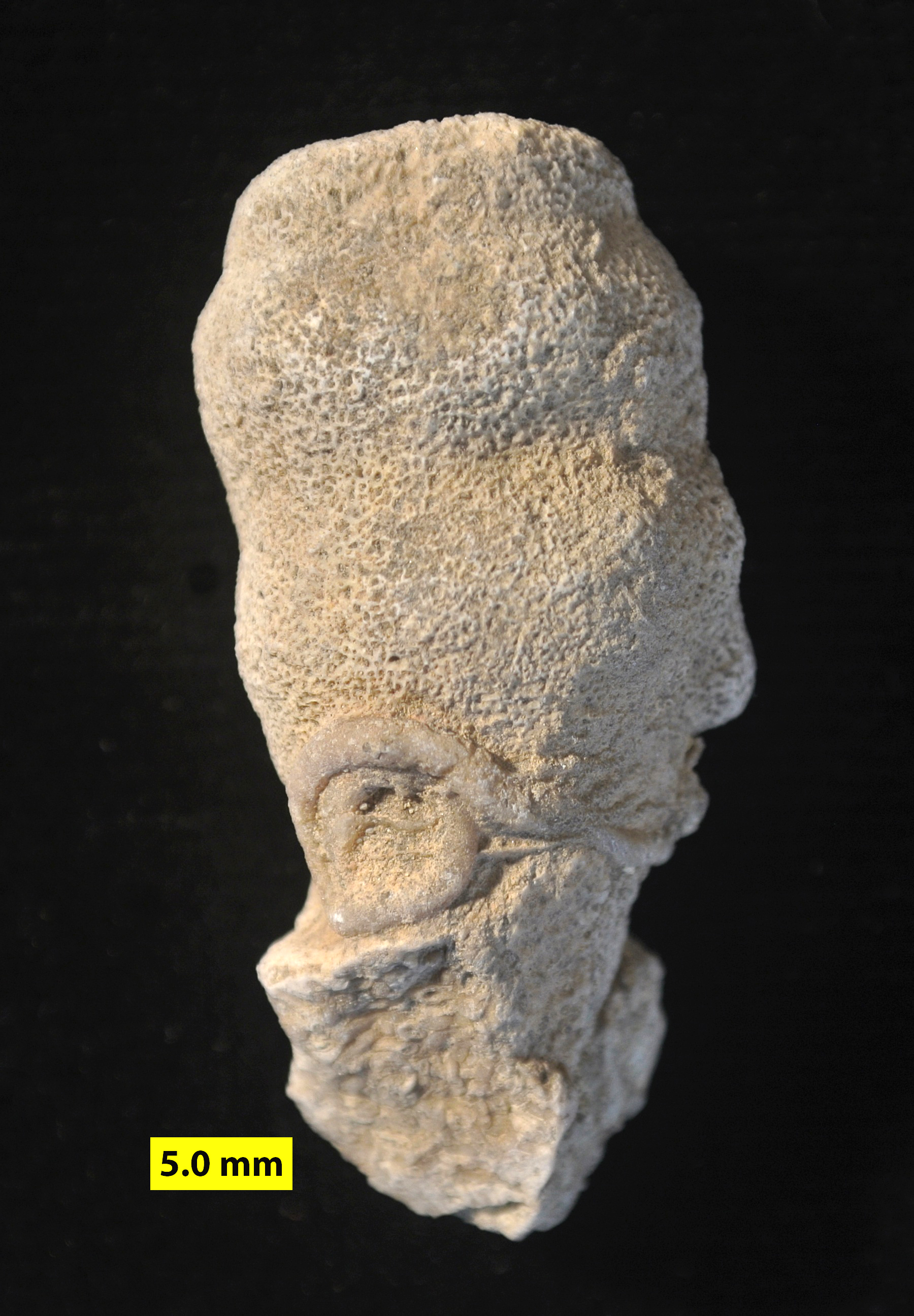
- Peronidella sp. from the Middle Jurassic of Israel.

Scientific classification
- Kingdom: Animalia
- Phylum: Porifera
- Class: Calcarea
- Order: †Stellispongiida
- Family: †Stellispongiidae
- Genus: †Peronidella; Hinde, 1893

Synonyms
- †Peronella

= Peronidella =

Extinct genus of sponges

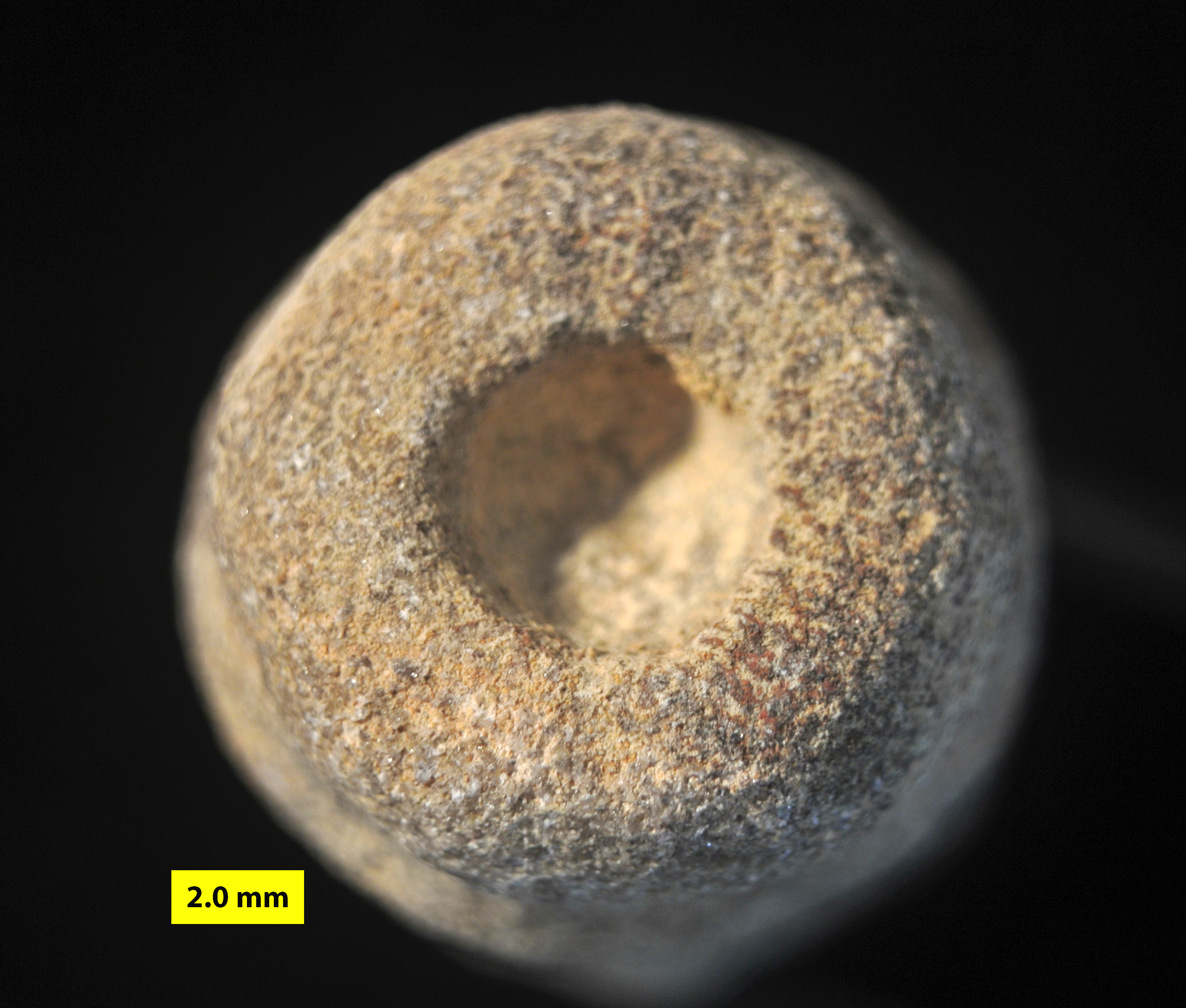
Peronidella from the Matmor Formation (Callovian) of southern Israel; osculum view.

Peronidella is an extinct genus of Calcareous sponges found in marine sedimentary rocks dated between the Devonian and the Cretaceous periods.

These sponges had cylindrically shaped walls, with a typical diameter of 2 cm, with a small platform at the top, showing the position of the Osculum. Many species, such as Peronidella furcata, were colonial; however, several solitary species are known.

These sponges are relatively abundant in European chalks
