= Sphaerocoeliidae =

Sphaerocoeliidae Temporal range: Permian–Cenomanian

Scientific classification
- Domain: Eukaryota
- Kingdom: Animalia
- Phylum: Porifera
- Class: Calcarea
- Order: †Sphaerocoeliida; Vacelet, 1979
- Family: †Sphaerocoeliidae; Steinmann, 1882

Genera
- see text.

Order of sponges

Sphaerocoeliidae is an extinct family of calcareous sponges, the only family in the monotypic order Sphaerocoeliida. Sphaerocoeliids are one of several unrelated sponge groups described as "sphinctozoans", with a distinctive multi-chambered body structure. Sphaerocoeliids persisted from the Permian to the Cenomanian stage of the Cretaceous, a longer period of time than most other "sphinctozoans". Sphaerocoeliids make up the majority of calcareous "sphinctozoans", as well as a large portion of post-Triassic "sphinctozoan" diversity. "Sphinctozoans" and the similar "inozoans" were historically grouped together in the polyphyletic order Pharetronida.

In general form, sphaerocoeliids are cylindrical, as a chain of dome-shaped chambers stacked up on each other. Each layer is pierced by a central osculum (outflow vent), which has the form of a simple hole. Sphaerocoeliids are hypermineralized, with a skeleton of loose calcareous spicules cemented together in calcite walls.

== Genera ==
- †Barroisia Munier-Chalmas, 1882 [Jurassic–Cretaceous (Aptian–Cenomanian)]
- †Sphaerocoelia Steinmann, 1882 [Permian–Cretaceous (Cenomanian)]
- †Sphinctonella Hurcewicz, 1975 [Jurassic (Oxfordian)]
- †Thalamopora Roemer, 1840 [Jurassic–Cretaceous (Cenomanian)]
- †Tremacystia Hinde, 1884 [Cretaceous (Albian–Cenomanian)]
