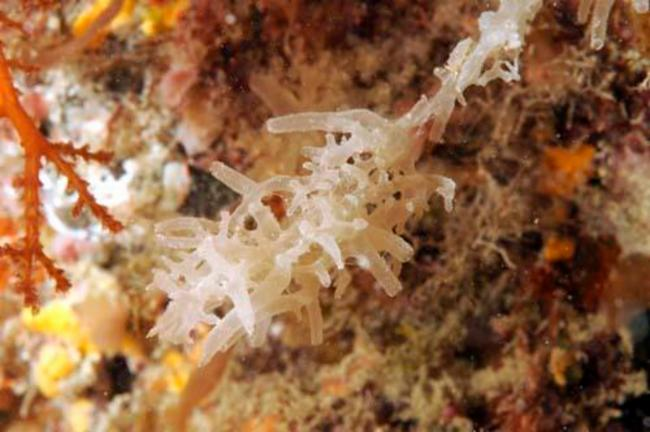

Scientific classification
- Kingdom: Animalia
- Phylum: Porifera
- Class: Calcarea
- Order: Clathrinida
- Family: Dendyidae
- Genus: Ascandra
- Species: A. contorta

Binomial name
- Ascandra contorta (Bowerbank, 1866)

Synonyms
- Ascaltis contorta (Bowerbank, 1866); Ascetta spinosa Lendenfeld, 1891; Clathrina contorta (Bowerbank, 1866); Clathrina spinosa von Lendenfeld, 1891; Clathrina spongiosa (Kölliker, 1864); Leucosolenia contorta Bowerbank, 1866; Nardoa spongiosa Kölliker, 1864

= Ascandra contorta =

Species of sponge

Ascandra contorta is a species of calcareous sponge belonging to the family Clathrinidae.

This is a whitish sponge which appears as a mass of irregular, convoluted tubes. It is very similar to Clathrina clathrus but usually differs in colour (C. clathrus is usually yellow) and by the presence of terminal oscula on vertical tubes (absent in C. clathrus). When viewed microscopically, the spicule structure of the two species is very different, A. contorta possessing two-pointed diactines and four-pointed tetractines as well as the three-pointed triactines which C. clathrus is exclusively made up of triactines.

This sponge is found on north-eastern Atlantic coasts from the Arctic to the Mediterranean, usually on rocks at depths of 10–30 m, but occasionally in shallower water.
