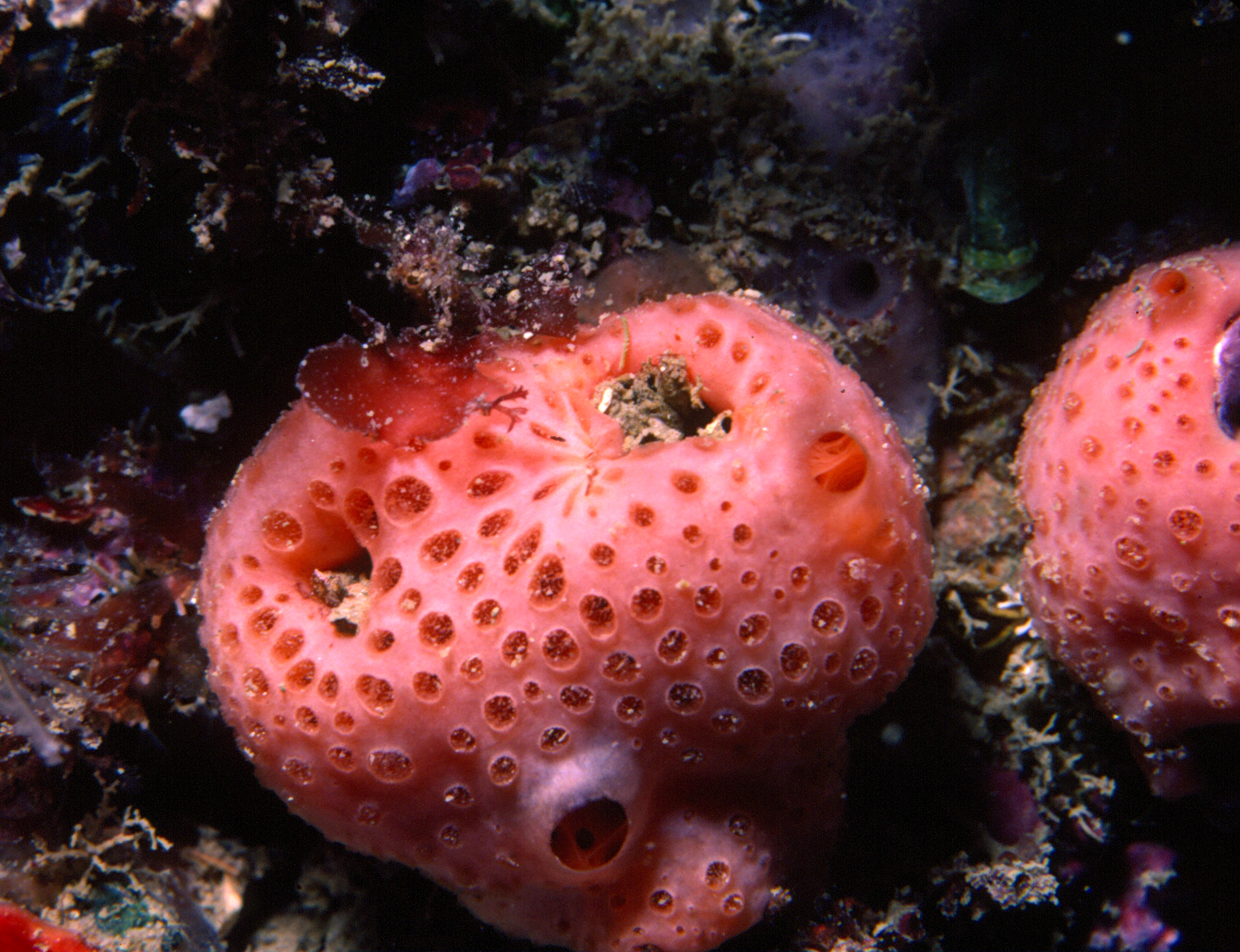

Scientific classification
- Kingdom: Animalia
- Phylum: Porifera
- Class: Demospongiae
- Order: Poecilosclerida
- Family: Hymedesmiidae
- Genus: Hemimycale
- Species: H. columella

Binomial name
- Hemimycale columella Bowerbank, 1874

Synonyms
- Desmacidon columella Bowerbank, 1874; Stylinos columella Topsent, 1894; Stylotella columella Lendenfield, 1895; Prianus columella de Laubenfels, 1932

= Hemimycale columella =

Species of demosponge

Hemimycale columella, the crater sponge, is a species of marine demosponge in the family Hymedesmiidae. It is the type species of the genus Hemimycale and is widely distributed across the Atlanto-Mediterranean region.

== Description ==
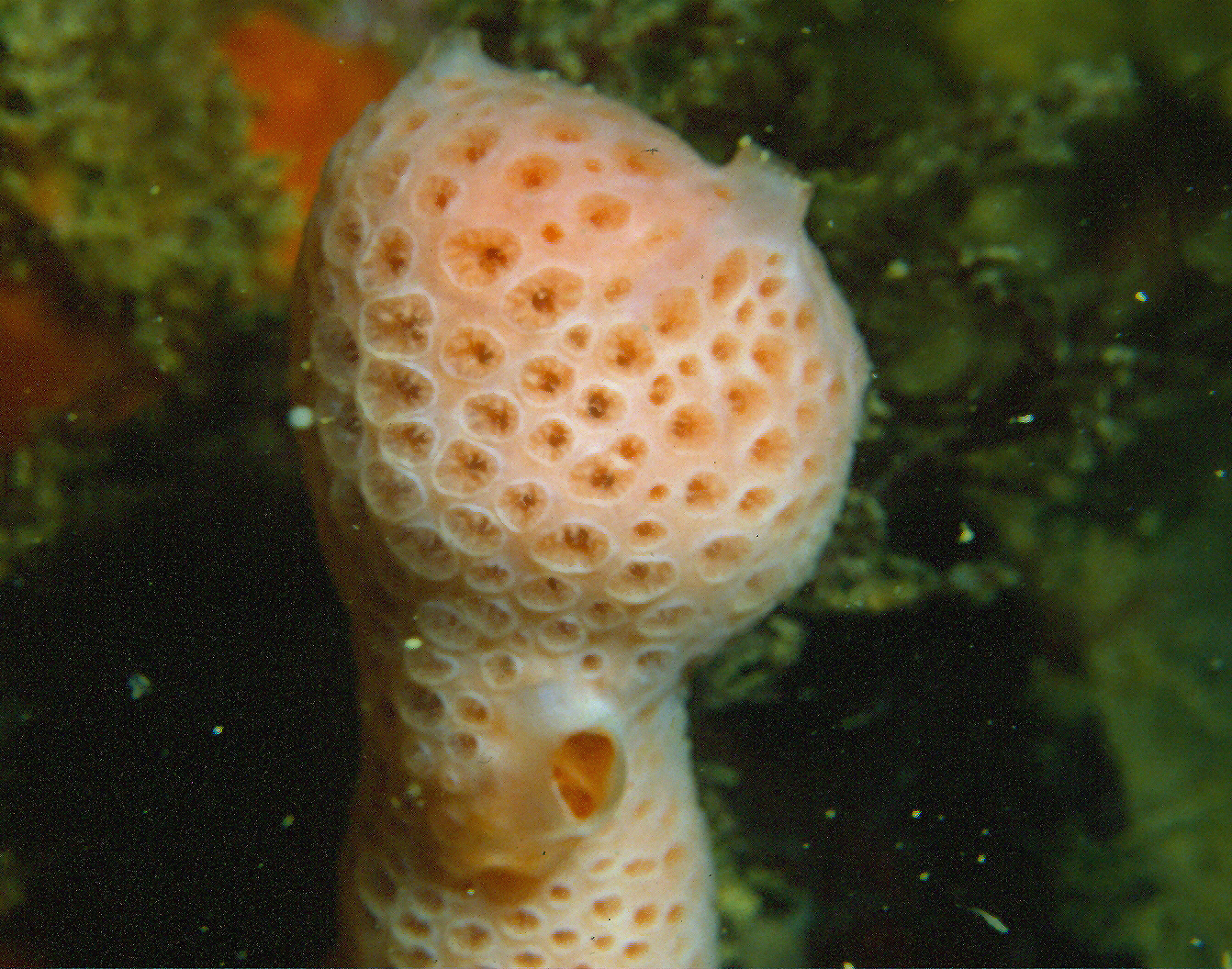
A white and orange colored specimen of Hemimycale columella

Hemimycale columella is an encrusting sponge that grows in a cushion with a diameter of 10–30 cm and a thickness of more than 1 cm. It is usually pale orange or pink but can also be a brighter red color. Its surface is covered in shallow, circular pits of varying sizes, the rims of which are usually a lighter color than the rest of the organism. Inside the pits are pores which are covered by a fine mesh.

The unrelated species Phorbus fictitus and Hymedesmia pauperatus have characteristics similar to these. However, their color is slightly different, and the pits of P. fititus are more regular than those of H. columella.

== Taxonomy ==
=== History ===
Because of its complex morphology, the taxonomical placement of Hemimycale columella has changed often since its original description. James Scott Bowerbank first described the species as Desmacidon columella in 1874, taking particular note of its "exceedingly abundant" gemmules. Émile Topsent then moved the species to Stylinos in 1891. He argued that the strongyles were sufficiently similar to warrant inclusion. However, in specimens from other localities from the ones he studied these similarities were not present. Thus, Desmacidon columella required its own genus. The situation was complicated further in the 1890s, as the composition and identity of Stylinos were brought into question. It was variously rejected entirely, synonymized with Stylotella, or retained as it was. At this point, the species was called Stylinos columella or Stylotella columella, but in 1932 the genus Prianos was resurrected by Max Walker de Laubenfels to house the newly segregated Prianos columella. This new name was not valid either, as the species had little in common with sponges previously placed in Prianos.

Finally, in 1934, Maurice Burton proposed the novel name Hemimycale as the generic for Bowerbank's originally published Desmacidon columella, creating the new combination Hemimycale columella. The new construction referenced the similarities in larvae between the species and members of Mycale, as well as the clear differences between H. columella and all related sponges. However, even twenty years after the introduction of the new name, acceptance was not universal, with biologists in the 1950s still referring to the species as belonging to its previous genera.

=== Phylogenetics ===
Some sponges have an affinity for convergent evolution when they occupy similar ecological niches, creating the possibility for cryptic species that are not closely related but are nearly morphologically identical. Often, the most effective way to find these cryptic species is to analyze the molecular phylogenetics of different populations of the same species which may be separated physically, behaviorally, or environmentally. Two distinct populations of Hemimycale columella exist which have been studied this way: one found in shallow water and one in deeper water. The results of these phylogenetic analyses suggested that H. columella as it is currently described may actually encompass two species. A 2017 paper argued that the shallow water Mediterranean populations actually represent a separate species: Hemimycale mediterranea. This new species has very few visible differences from H. columella, but does appear to lack styles entirely and is typically more brownish in color.

== Ecology ==
The species is found attached to bedrock and boulders in silt-free littoral areas around the British Isles and in the Mediterranean Sea.

=== Defense ===
Sea urchins are the main predators of Hemimycale columella. There are numerous defensive mechanisms that H. columella used to avoid or discourage this predation. The two primary methods are secondary metabolites (organic compounds which are excreted) and calcibacteria (endosymbiotes which form a shield-like structure). While sea urchin species like Paracentrotus lividus regularly consume sponges with only calcibacterial defenses, it has not been observed to prey upon H. columella due to the combination of chemicals and calcibacteria. The presence of the calcibacteria in the flesh of the sponge also decreases its nutritional content, possibly causing some herbivorous fishes to choose other prey.

=== Reproduction ===
Hemimycale columella is hermaphroditic and gives birth to live offspring. The development of new generations typically begins with the increase in water temperature over the summer, with embryo development lasting from around September to October. These embryos develop at different rates over this period, and varying stages of embryos can be found in a single parent organism. Once they develop into larvae, the young are dispersed with the rapid decrease in water temperature in late October.
