= Lelapiidae =

Scientific classification
- Kingdom: Animalia
- Phylum: Porifera
- Class: Calcarea
- Order: Leucosolenida
- Family: Lelapiidae; Dendy & Row, 1913

Genera
- Grantiopsis Dendy, 1893; Kebira Row, 1909; Lelapia Gray, 1867; Paralelapia Hôzawa, 1923

Family of sponges

Lelapiidae is a family of calcareous sponges in the order Leucosolenida.
