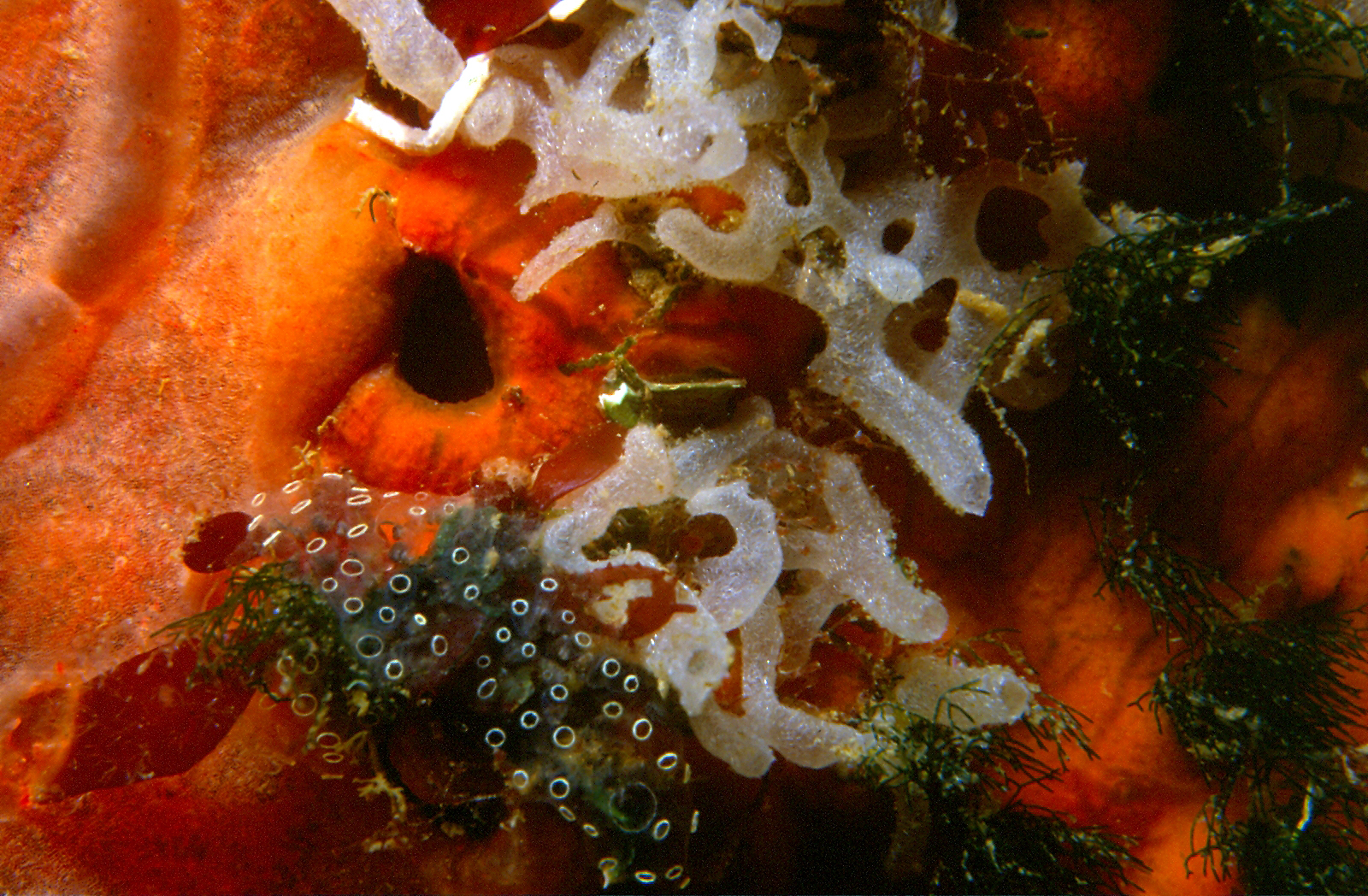
- Leucosolenia variabilis

Scientific classification
- Kingdom: Animalia
- Phylum: Porifera
- Class: Calcarea
- Order: Leucosolenida
- Family: Leucosoleniidae; Minchin, 1898

Genera
- Ascute Dendy & Row, 1913; Ascyssa Haeckel, 1872; Leucosolenia Bowerbank, 1864

= Leucosoleniidae =

Family of calcareous sponges of the order Leucosolenida

Leucosoleniidae is a family of calcareous sponges in the order Leucosolenida.
