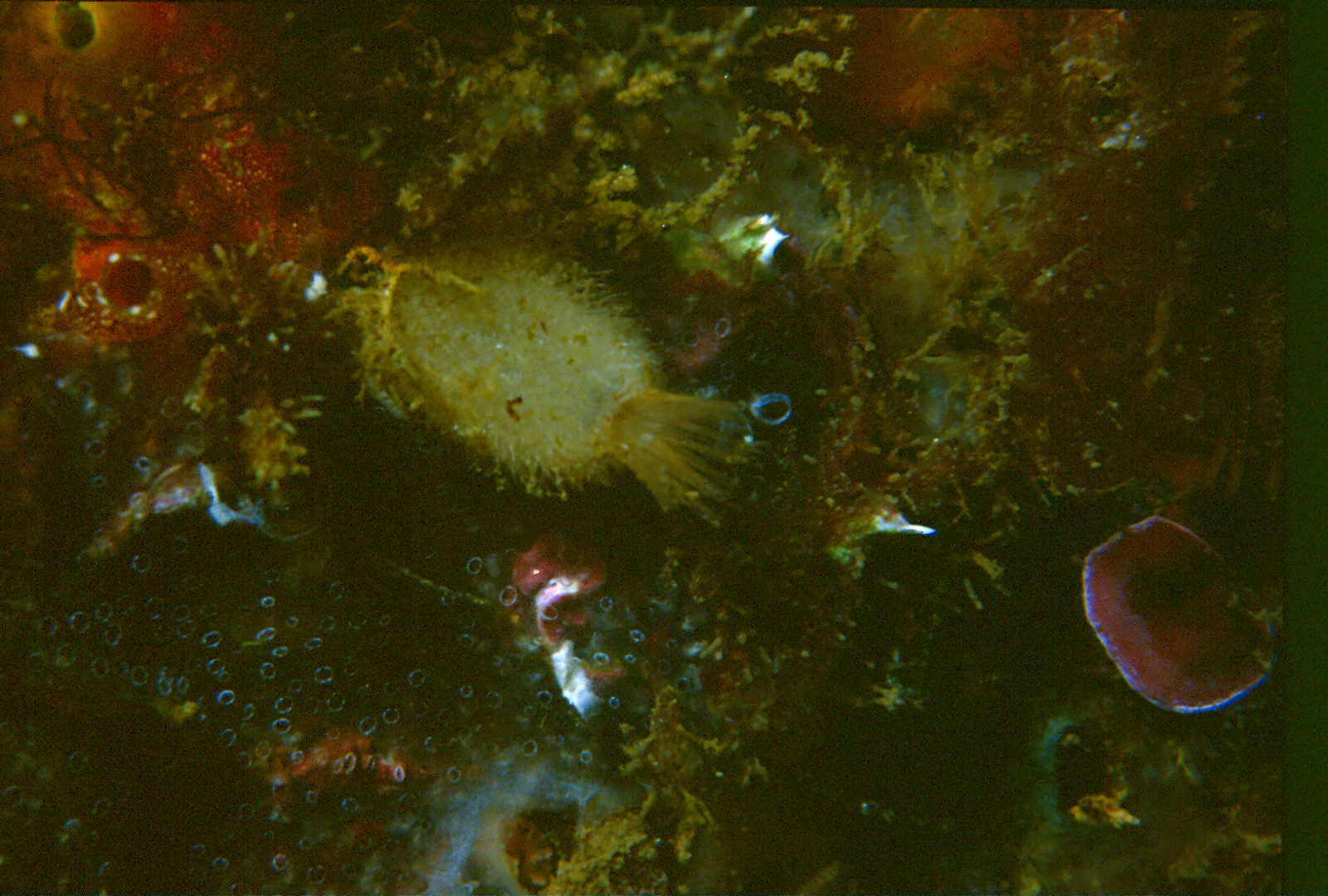
- Sycon raphanus

Scientific classification
- Kingdom: Animalia
- Phylum: Porifera
- Class: Calcarea
- Order: Leucosolenida
- Family: Sycettidae

Genera
- Sycetta Haeckel, 1872; Sycon Risso, 1827

= Sycettidae =

Family of calcareous sponges in the order Leucosolenida

Sycettidae is a family of calcareous sponges in the order Leucosolenida.
