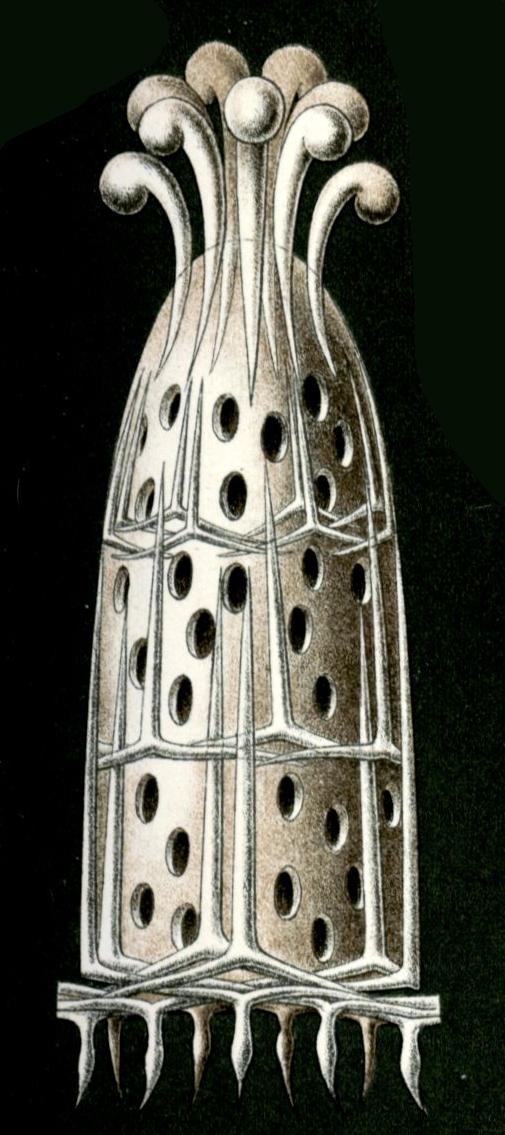
- Grantia compressa (Grantiidae)

Scientific classification
- Kingdom: Animalia
- Phylum: Porifera
- Class: Calcarea
- Subclass: Calcaronea
- Order: Leucosolenida; Hartman, 1958

Families
- See text.

= Leucosolenida =

Order of calcareous sponges

Leucosolenida is an order of sponges in the class Calcarea and the subclass Calcaronea. Species in Leucosolenida are calcareous, with a skeleton composed exclusively of free spicules without calcified non-spicular reinforcements.

According to Systema Porifera (2002), Lucosolenida contains 9 families, ranging from fully asconoid forms (Leucosoleniidae) to fully leuconoid forms. These body plans are on a continuum based on an increasingly complex skeletal system and compartmentalized choanocytes. A few sources (such as the Treatise on Invertebrate Paleontology, 2004) place non-asconoid families into a separate order, Sycettida. Leucosolenids have a poor fossil record, with only a few ambiguous grantiid fossils reported from the Jurassic and Carboniferous.

== Families ==
- Achramorphidae Borojevic et al., 2002 (formerly known as Staurorrhaphidae)
- Amphoriscidae Dendy, 1892
- Grantiidae Dendy, 1892
- Heteropiidae Dendy, 1892
- Jenkinidae Borojevic et al., 2000
- Lelapiidae? Dendy & Row, 1913
- Leucosoleniidae Minchin, 1900
- Sycanthidae Lendenfeld, 1891
- Sycettidae Dendy, 1892 (sometimes known as Syconidae)
