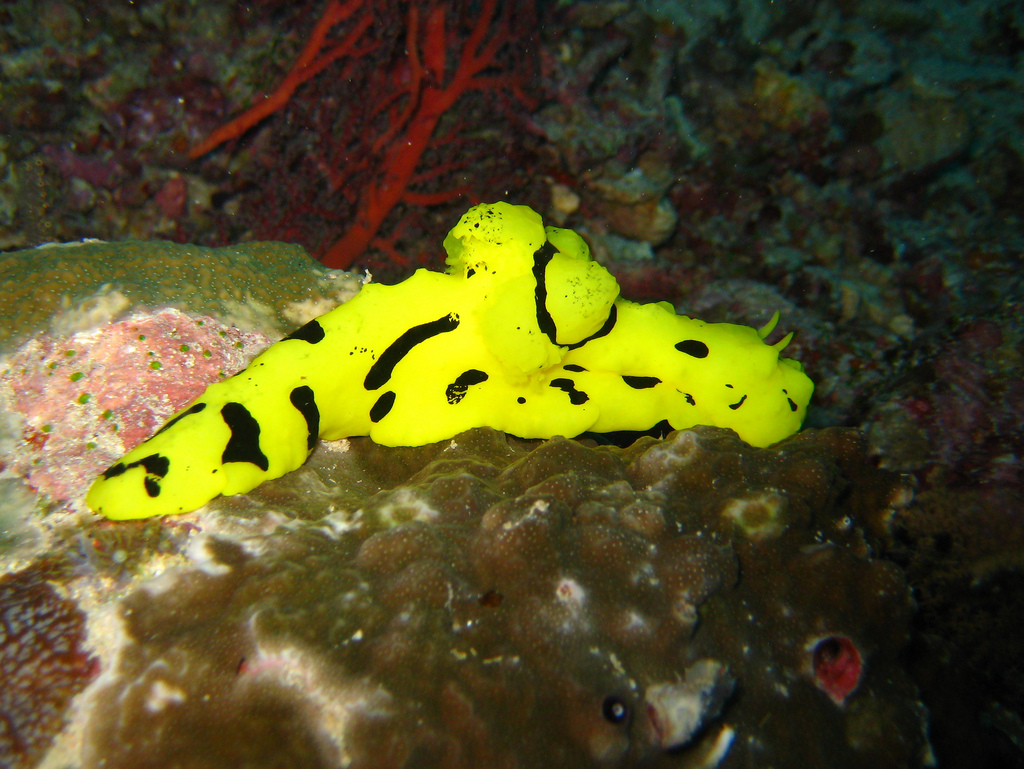

Scientific classification
- Kingdom: Animalia
- Phylum: Mollusca
- Class: Gastropoda
- Order: Nudibranchia
- Family: Aegiridae
- Genus: Notodoris
- Species: N. gardineri

Binomial name
- Notodoris gardineri Eliot, 1906

Synonyms
- Aegires gardineri (Eliot, 1906); Notodoris gardineri var. nigerrima Yonow, 1994; Notodoris megastigmata Allan, 1932

= Notodoris gardineri =

Species of gastropod

Notodoris gardineri is a sea slug, which is a species of nudibranch, a shell-less marine gastropod mollusc in the family Aegiridae.

== Description ==
Notodoris gardineri can reach more than 10 cm long. In different geographical regions the background color of the animal can vary. In the archipelagoes of the Maldives and Laccadives, the body is black with yellow spots while in the rest of the distribution range the body is yellow with black spots. The size and numbers of spots vary from one individual to another. The gills are situated in the center of the dorsal side, they are yellow and protected by three round lobes. The body is stiff and protected by small spicules. The rhinophores are smooth, simple, yellow and retractable. Notodoris gardineri can be mistaken for Notodoris minor, whose body colour is also yellow with black markings except that in the latter the black forms lines on the body and not spots.

== Distribution ==
This species occurs in the tropical Indo-West Pacific.

== Habitat ==
This nudibranch lives on the external slope or top of coral reefs, commonly at 7 to 15 m depth.

== Feeding ==
Notodoris gardineri feeds mainly, according to the actual observations, on sponges of the family of Leucettidae as Pericharax heterographis or Leucetta primigenia.

== Behaviour ==
This Notodoris is benthic and diurnal, moves at sight without fear of being taken for a prey.

== Bibliographical references ==
- P.L. Beesley, G.J.B. Ross & A. Wells, "Mollusca - The Southern Synthesis", vol.5, CSIRO, 1998, ISBN 0-643-05756-0
- David Behrens,"Nudibranch behaviour", Newworld Publication INC., 2005, ISBN 978-1878348418
- Gary Cobb & Richard Willan,"Undersea jewels- a colour guide to nudibranchs", Australian Biological Resources Study, 2006, ISBN 0642568472
- Neville Coleman, "Marine life of Maldives", Atoll editions, 2004, ISBN 187-6410-361
- Andrea & Antonnella Ferrrari,"Macrolife", Nautilus publishing, 2003, ISBN 983-2731-00-3
