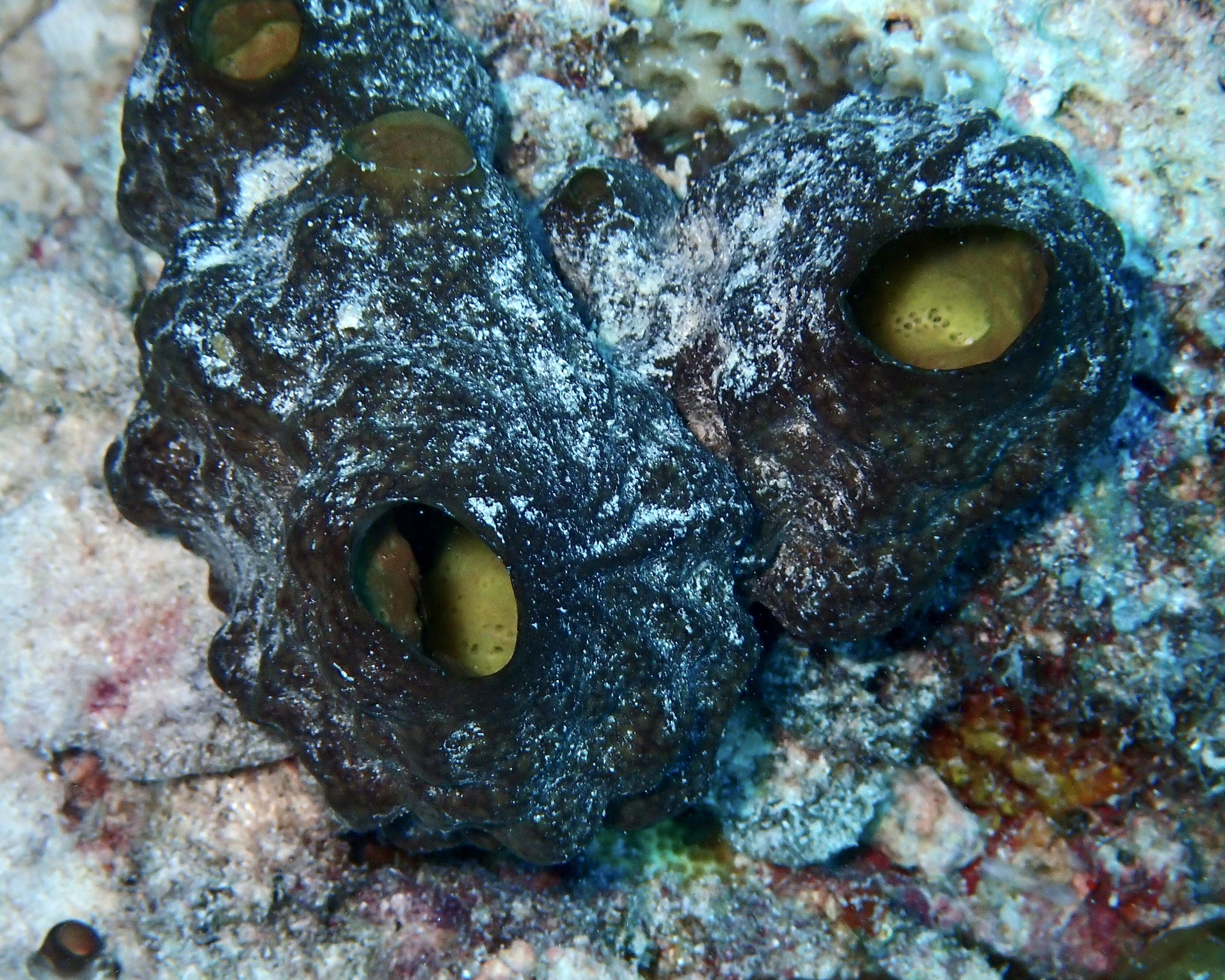

Scientific classification
- Kingdom: Animalia
- Phylum: Porifera
- Class: Calcarea
- Order: Clathrinida
- Family: Leucettidae
- Genus: Leucetta
- Species: L. avocada

Binomial name
- Leucetta avocada Laubenfels, 1954

= Leucetta avocada =

Species of sponge

Leucetta avocada is a species of calcareous sponge in the family Leucettidae, and was first described in 1954 by Laubenfels.
