= Aegires absalaoi =

Scientific classification
- Domain: Eukaryota
- Kingdom: Animalia
- Phylum: Mollusca
- Class: Gastropoda
- Order: Nudibranchia
- Superfamily: Polyceroidea
- Family: Aegiridae
- Genus: Aegires
- Species: A. absalaoi

Binomial name
- Aegires absalaoi Garcia, Troncoso & Dominguez, 2002

Species of gastropod

Aegires absalaoi is a species of sea slug, a nudibranch, a marine, opisthobranch gastropod mollusc in the family Aegiridae.

== Distribution ==
This species was described from Fernando de Noronha, Brazil.
