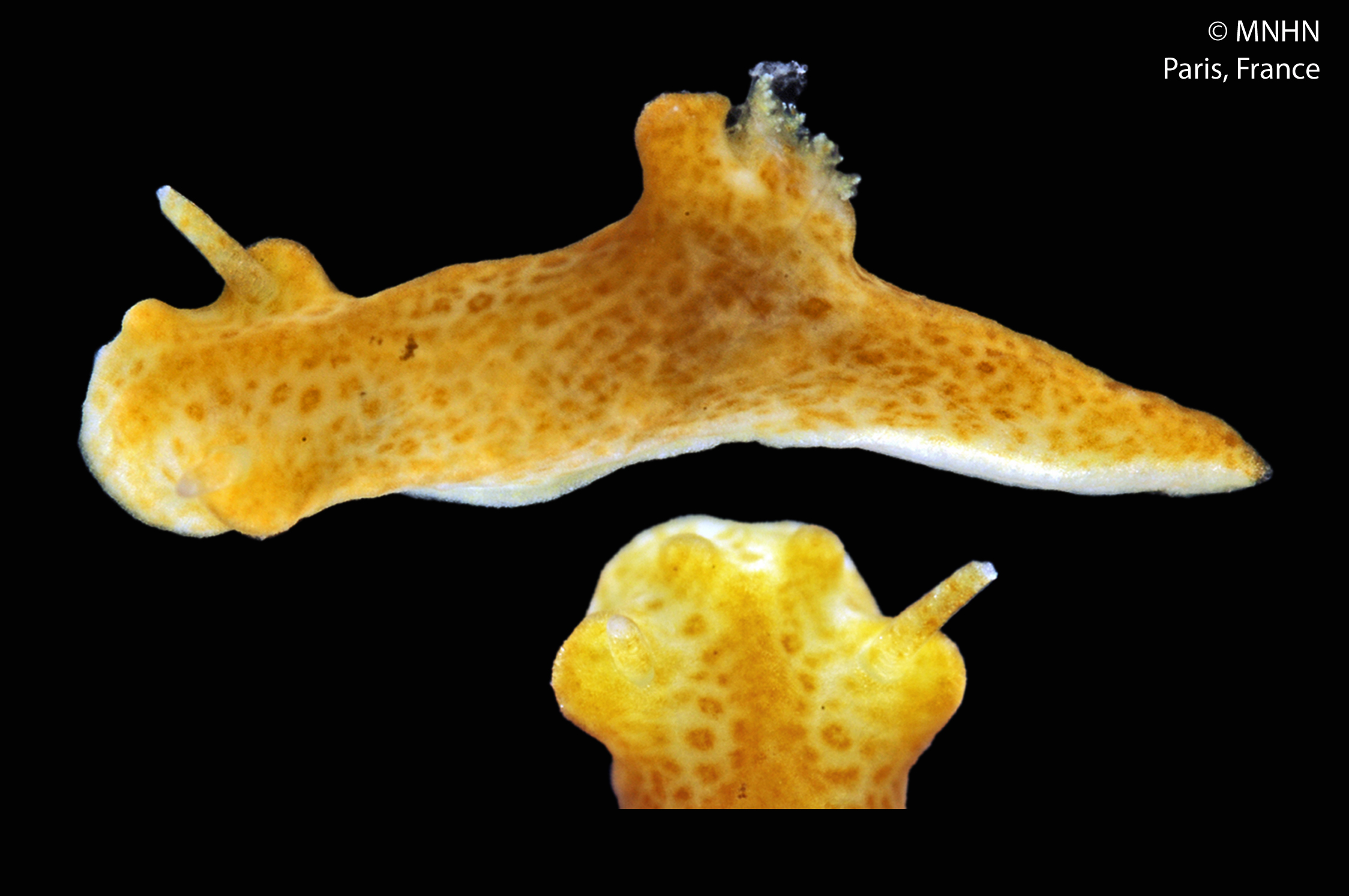

Scientific classification
- Domain: Eukaryota
- Kingdom: Animalia
- Phylum: Mollusca
- Class: Gastropoda
- Order: Nudibranchia
- Superfamily: Polyceroidea
- Family: Aegiridae
- Genus: Aegires
- Species: A. ochum

Binomial name
- Aegires ochum Ortea, Espinosa & Caballer, 2013

= Aegires ochum =

Species of gastropod

Aegires ochum is a species of sea slug, a nudibranch, a marine, opisthobranch gastropod mollusk in the family Aegiridae.

== Distribution ==
This species was described from Pointe de La Fontaine (type locality: 16°27.74′N 61°31.84′W), GR30, Anse Bertrand, Guadeloupe.
