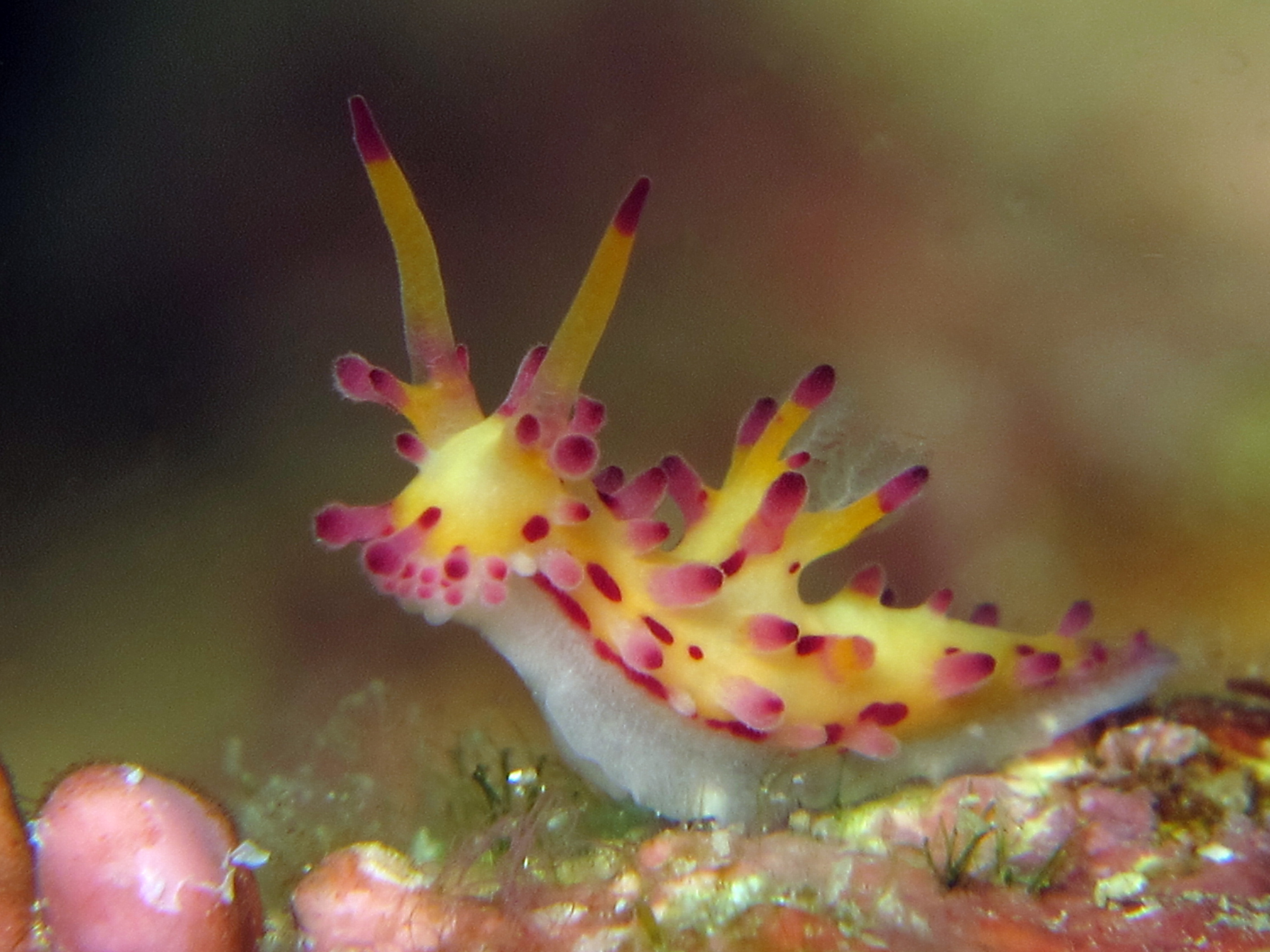
- Aegires villosus in the Philippines

Scientific classification
- Domain: Eukaryota
- Kingdom: Animalia
- Phylum: Mollusca
- Class: Gastropoda
- Order: Nudibranchia
- Superfamily: Polyceroidea
- Family: Aegiridae
- Genus: Aegires
- Species: A. villosus

Binomial name
- Aegires villosus Farran, 1905

= Aegires villosus =

Species of gastropod

Aegires villosus is a species of sea slug. It is a dorid nudibranch, a shell-less marine gastropod mollusc in the family Aegiridae.

== Distribution ==
Widespread Indo-West Pacific species.

== Diet ==
Aegires villosus feeds on calcareous sponges.
