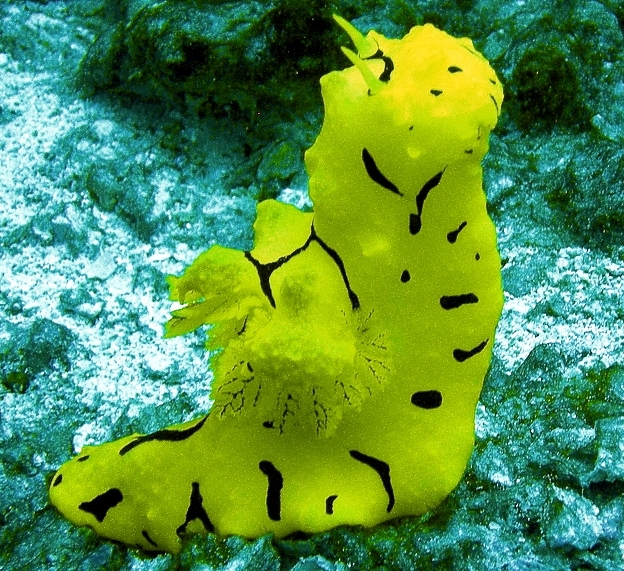
- An individual of N. minor rearing up

Scientific classification
- Kingdom: Animalia
- Phylum: Mollusca
- Class: Gastropoda
- Order: Nudibranchia
- Family: Aegiridae
- Genus: Notodoris
- Species: N. minor

Binomial name
- Notodoris minor Eliot, 1904

Synonyms
- Aegires minor (Eliot, 1904)

= Notodoris minor =

Species of gastropod

Notodoris minor is a species of sea slug. It is a dorid nudibranch, a shell-less marine gastropod mollusc in the family Aegiridae.

== Taxonomy ==
This species was known as Notodoris minor, but a 2004 paper considered Notodoris to be a junior synonym of the genus Aegires. This decision was reversed in 2015.

== Description ==
Notodoris minor can grow to 14 cm in length. The skin is toughened with tiny spicules. The upper surfaces have a few irregular pustules, while the small rhinophores are smooth and simple. The branched gills are located midway along the body and are partially hidden by three large lobes. The Notodoris minor has a yellow background colour and a pattern of diagonal and transverse black lines arranged in a network covering the entire body. The gills and rhinophores are yellow, but in younger specimens and with some adults, there may be some black pigmentation.

== Distribution ==
Notodoris minor lives in the Indo-west Pacific area. It has been found in the Philippines, Vanuatu, Solomon Islands, Mauritius, Tanzania, Oman, Indonesia, Okinawa, Papua New Guinea, and the Great Barrier Reef.

== Diet ==
Notodoris minor feeds on calcareous sponges belonging to the family Leucettidae. In the Indo-West Pacific, specimens have been recorded eating Leucetta primigenia.

== Gallery ==
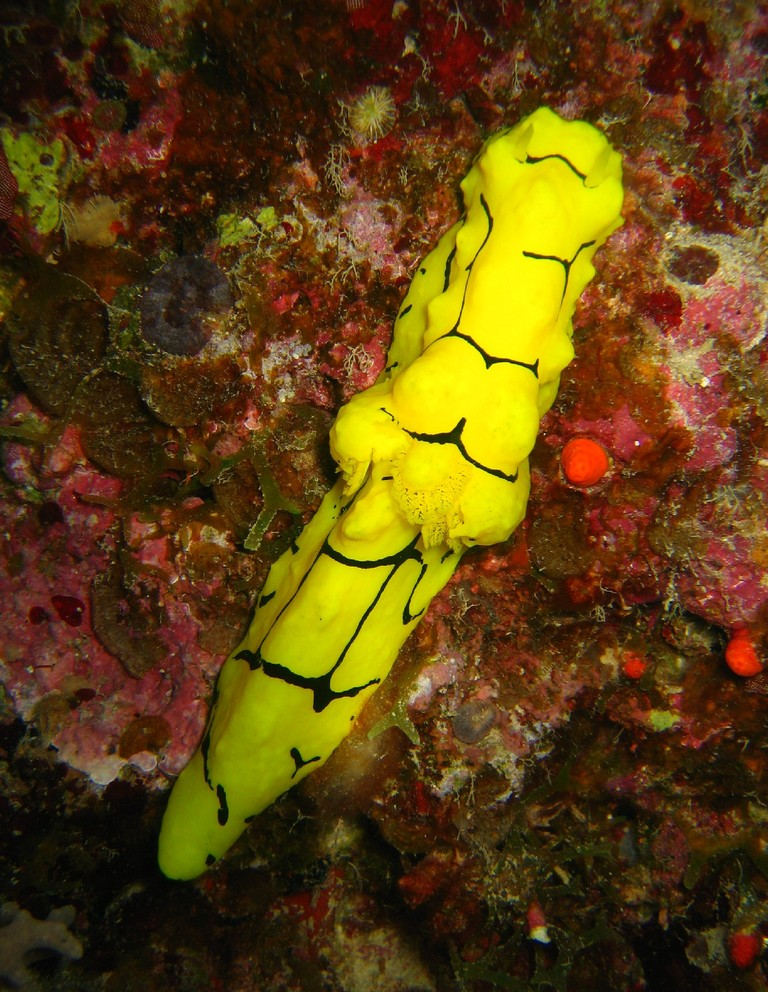
An individual of Notodoris minor crawling

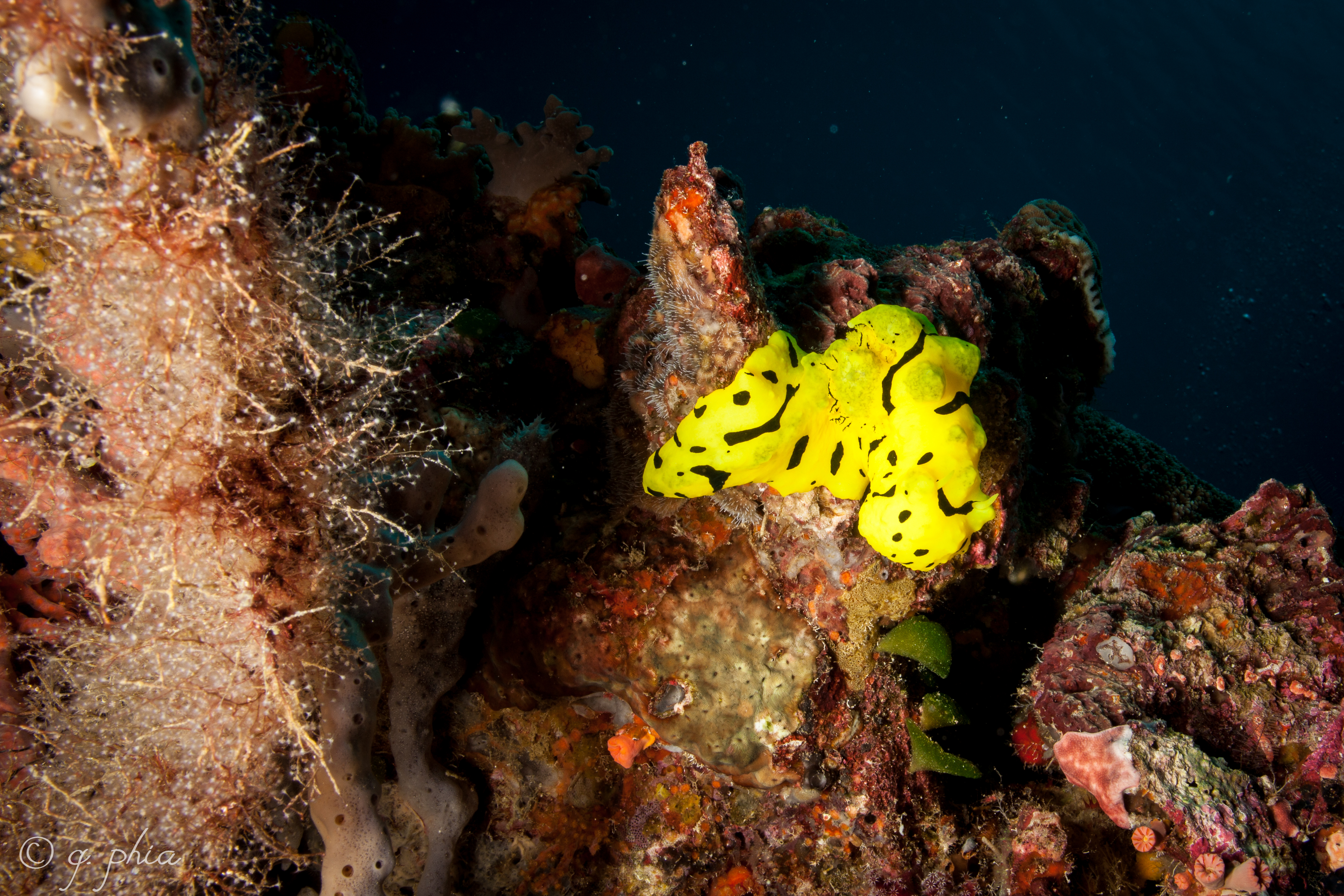
Notodoris minor in Wakatobi National Park, 2018
