= Aegires gracilis =

Scientific classification
- Domain: Eukaryota
- Kingdom: Animalia
- Phylum: Mollusca
- Class: Gastropoda
- Order: Nudibranchia
- Superfamily: Polyceroidea
- Family: Aegiridae
- Genus: Aegires
- Species: A. gracilis

Binomial name
- Aegires gracilis Ortea, Moro & Espinosa 2015

Species of gastropod

Aegires gracilis is a species of sea slug, a nudibranch, a marine, opisthobranch gastropod mollusc in the family Aegiridae.

== Distribution ==
This species was described from the Caribbean Sea coast of Costa Rica.
