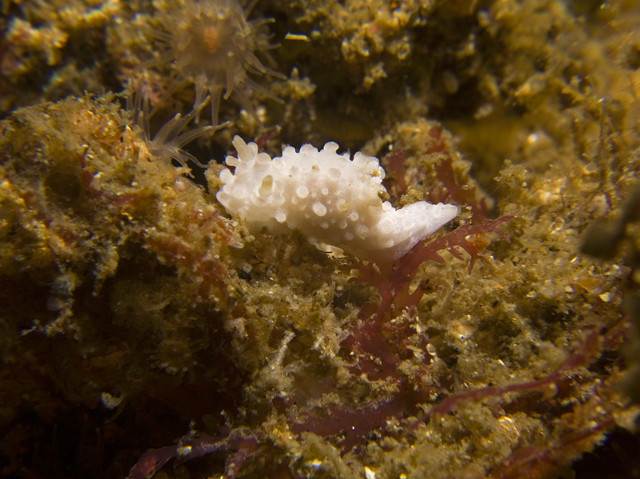
- A live individual of the knobbly nudibranch, Aegires ninguis

Scientific classification
- Kingdom: Animalia
- Phylum: Mollusca
- Class: Gastropoda
- Order: Nudibranchia
- Family: Aegiridae
- Genus: Aegires; Lovén, 1844

Synonyms
- Aegires (Anaegires) Odhner, 1934; Aegirus Agassiz, 1846 (unjustified emendation, introduced in synonymy); Anaegires Odhner, 1934; Serigea F. Nordsieck, 1972; Triopella G.O. Sars, 1878

= Aegires =

Genus of gastropods

Aegires is a genus of sea slugs, dorid nudibranchs, marine gastropod mollusks in the family Aegiridae. Species within this genus feed exclusively on calcareous sponges.

Aegires is the type genus of the family Aegiridae.

== Species ==
Species in the genus Aegires include:

- Aegires absalaoi Garcia, Troncoso & Dominguez, 2002
- Aegires acauda Ortea, Moro & Espinosa, 2015
- Aegires albopunctatus MacFarland, 1905
- Aegires albus Thiele, 1912
- Aegires citrinus Pruvot-Fol, 1930
- Aegires corrugatus Ortea, Moro & Espinosa, 2015
- Aegires evorae Moro & Ortea, 2015
- Aegires exeches Fahey & Gosliner, 2004
- Aegires flores Fahey & Gosliner, 2004
- Aegires gomezi Ortea, Luque & Templado, 1990
- Aegires gracilis Ortea, Moro & Espinosa, 2015
- Aegires hapsis Fahey & Gosliner, 2004
- Aegires incisus (G.O. Sars, 1872)
- Aegires incusus Fahey & Gosliner, 2004
- Aegires lagrifaensis Ortea, Moro & Espinosa, 2015
- Aegires lemoncello Fahey & Gosliner, 2004
- Aegires leuckartii Vérany, 1853
- Aegires malinus Fahey & Gosliner, 2004
- Aegires ninguis Fahey & Gosliner, 2004
- Aegires ochum Ortea, Espinosa & Caballer, 2013
- Aegires ortizi Templado, Luque & Ortea, 1987
- Aegires palensis Ortea, Luque & Templado, 1990
- Aegires petalis Fahey & Gosliner, 2004
- Aegires punctilucens (d'Orbigny, 1837) - type species of Aegires
- Aegires sublaevis Odhner, 1932
- Aegires villosus Farran, 1905

Species brought into synonymy

- Aegires citrinus (Bergh, 1875): synonym of Notodoris citrina Bergh, 1875
- Aegires gardineri (Eliot, 1906): synonym of Notodoris gardineri Eliot, 1906
- Aegires hispidus Hesse, 1872: synonym of Aegires punctilucens (d'Orbigny, 1837)
- Aegires leuckarti [sic]: synonym of Aegires leuckartii Vérany, 1853
- Aegires minor (Eliot, 1904): synonym of Notodoris minor Eliot, 1904
- Aegires protectus Odhner, 1934: synonym of Aegires albus Thiele, 1912
- Aegires pruvotfolae Fahey & Gosliner, 2004: synonym of Aegires citrinus Pruvot-Fol, 1930
- Aegires serenae (Gosliner & Behrens, 1997): synonym of Notodoris serenae Gosliner & Behrens, 1997
