= Aegires evorae =

Scientific classification
- Domain: Eukaryota
- Kingdom: Animalia
- Phylum: Mollusca
- Class: Gastropoda
- Order: Nudibranchia
- Superfamily: Polyceroidea
- Family: Aegiridae
- Genus: Aegires
- Species: A. evorae

Binomial name
- Aegires evorae Moro & Ortea, 2015

Species of gastropod

Aegires evorae is a species of sea slug, a nudibranch, a marine, opisthobranch gastropod mollusc in the family Aegiridae.

The specific name evorae is in honour of Cesária Évora, a Cape Verdean popular singer.

== Distribution ==
This species was described from Calhetinha, in the northeast of the island of Sal, Cape Verde Islands.

== Description ==
Aegires evorae has a cream-white body with a patchy brown overlay which is broken by regularly spaced, circular patches of darker brown dots. The rhinophores have a distinctive narrow band of brown below the tip.

== Ecology ==
This nudibranch probably feeds on the calcareous sponge, Clathrina coriacea.
