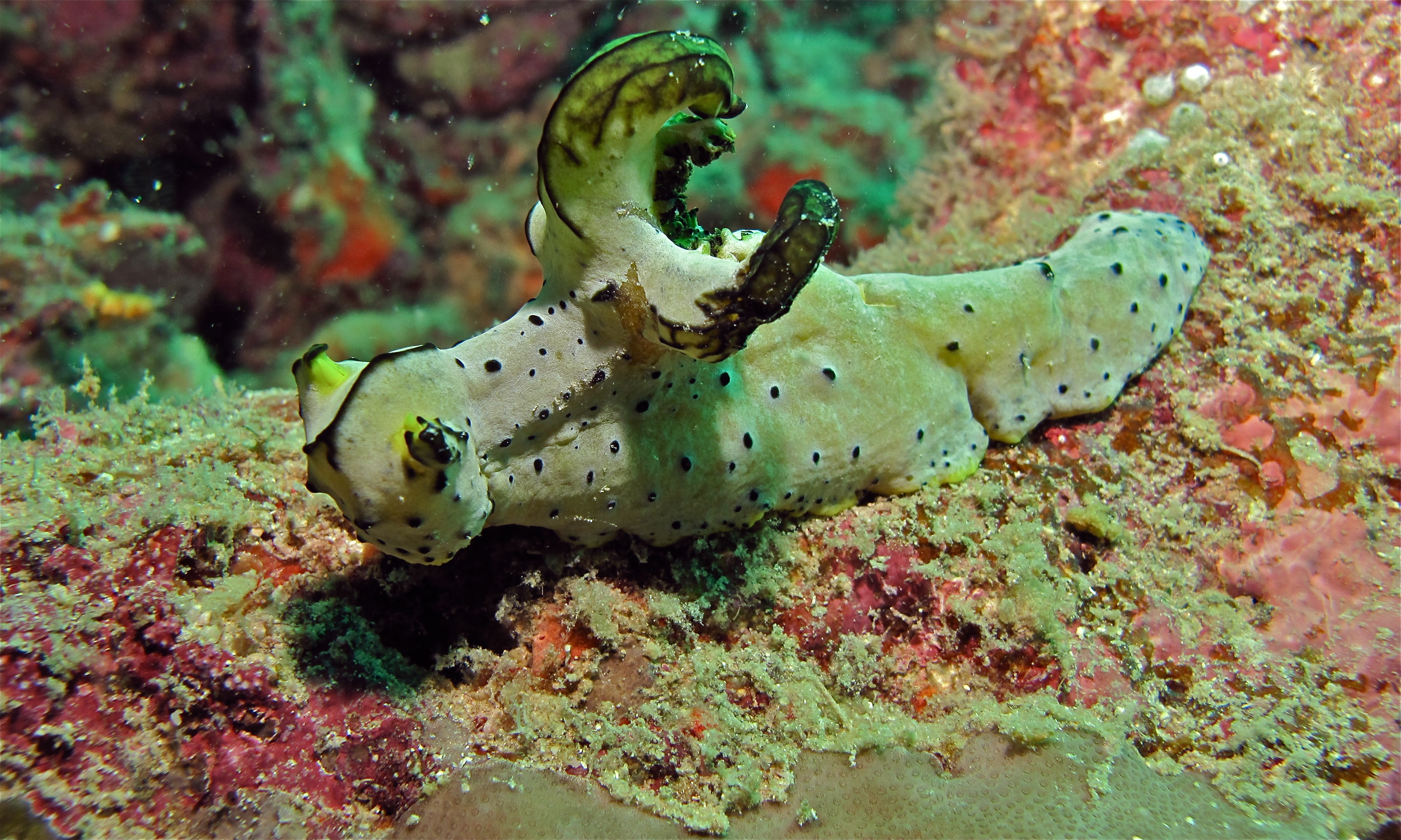
- The nudibranch Notodoris serenae, Lobster Reef, Pulau Mabul, Sabah, Malaysia.

Scientific classification
- Kingdom: Animalia
- Phylum: Mollusca
- Class: Gastropoda
- Order: Nudibranchia
- Family: Aegiridae
- Genus: Notodoris
- Species: N. serenae

Binomial name
- Notodoris serenae Gosliner & Behrens, 1997

Synonyms
- Aegires serenae (Gosliner & Behrens, 1997)

= Notodoris serenae =

Species of gastropod

Notodoris serenae is a species of sea slug. It is a dorid nudibranch, a shell-less marine gastropod mollusc in the family Aegiridae.

== Distribution ==
This species was described from Papua New Guinea. It lives in the Indo-west Pacific area, where it has been found in the Philippines, Indonesia, Malaysia, Palau, Pohnpei, the Solomon Islands and Okinawa.

== Description ==
Notodoris serenae can grow to more than 10 cm in length. It is predominantly grey in colour with raised black tubercles scattered all over the body and raised black ridges on the head and the processes in front of the gills. There are large extra-brachial appendages which shelter the gills, which are green and sometimes edged with yellow. The rhinophores are yellow and so is the underside and edge of the foot.

== Diet ==
Notodoris serenae feeds on calcareous sponges belonging to the family Leucettidae. It has been recorded eating Leucetta chagosensis Dendy, 1913.
