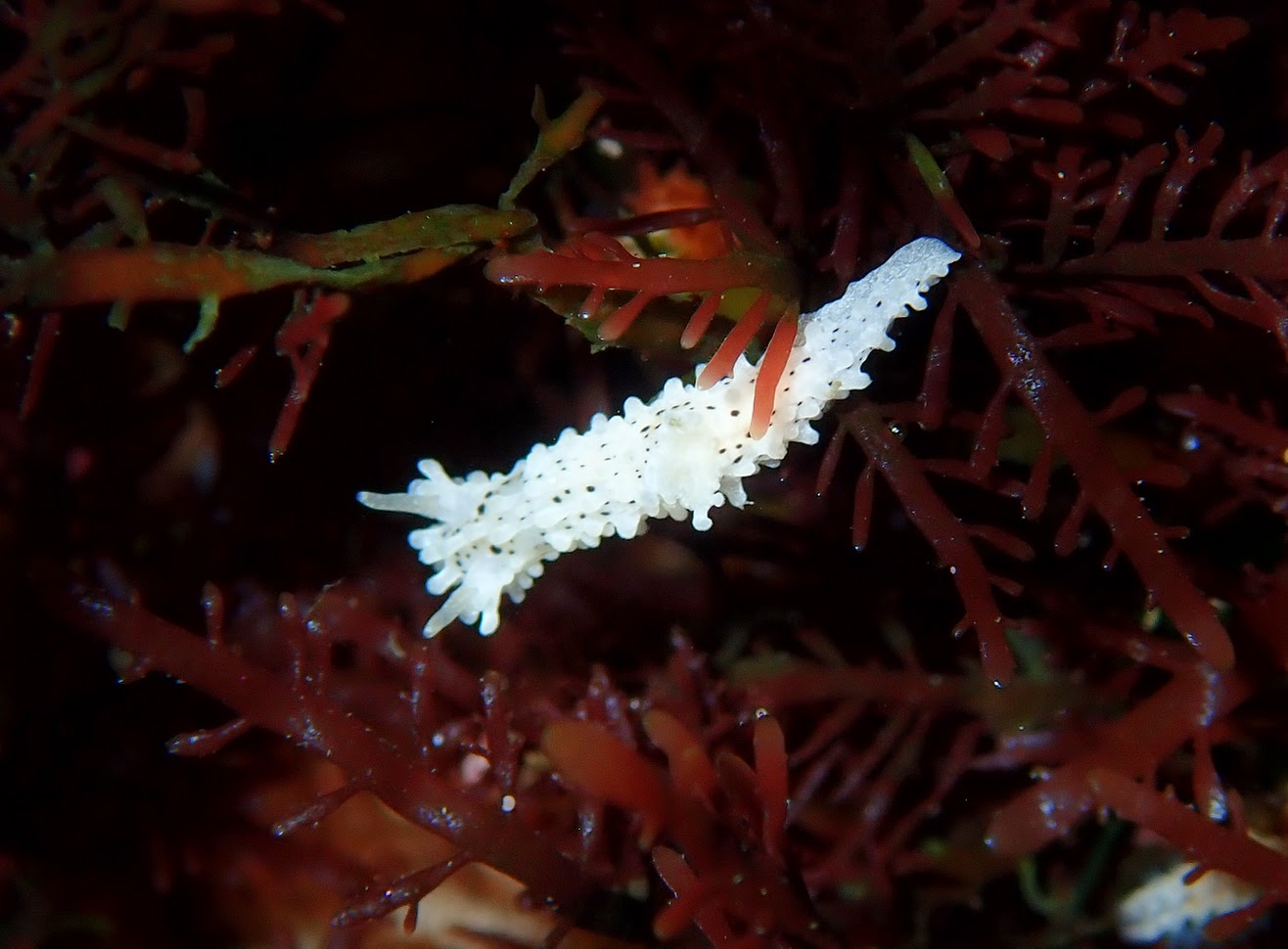
- from Newport Beach, California

Scientific classification
- Kingdom: Animalia
- Phylum: Mollusca
- Class: Gastropoda
- Order: Nudibranchia
- Family: Aegiridae
- Genus: Aegires
- Species: A. albopunctatus

Binomial name
- Aegires albopunctatus MacFarland, 1905

= Aegires albopunctatus =

Species of sea slug

Aegires albopunctatus, commonly known as the salt-and-pepper doris, is a species of sea slug or nudibranch, a marine gastropod mollusk in the family Aegiridae.

Other common names include the salt-and-pepper nudibranch, small white nudibranch, white knight nudibranch, and white-spotted doris.

== Distribution ==
The salt-and-pepper doris occurs in the Eastern Pacific Ocean, along the coast stretching from British Columbia, Canada to Baja California, Mexico. It inhabits the low intertidal zone and the shallow subtidal zone, down to depths of 100 ft (30 m). The salt-and-pepper doris can be found in sheltered, rocky tide pools and on wharf pilings.

== Description ==
The salt-and-pepper doris grows up to 0.9 in (23 mm) in length. Its body is somewhat shaped like a squarish torpedo, and ranges in color from bright white to duller, yellowish-gray shades of white. As its common name references, the salt-and-pepper doris is noted for the small dark and white spots all around its body, which resemble ground table salt and black pepper. The larger, dark "pepper" spots appear black or dark brown in color, while the white "salt" flecks may not be very distinct on brighter white individuals; they are more apparent on grayer individuals. Some individuals may have very little "pepper" spots, or none at all.

Like other members of its genus, the body wall of the salt-and-pepper doris is firm to the touch, as it is filled with spicules from the sponges it consumes. Its body is lined with irregular rows of short, cylindrical tubercles. Its rhinophores are yellowish in color and, like the tubercles along its body, are truncated and simple in shape. It has 3 gills or branchial plumes which are small, tripinnate, and each sheltered by a large, irregularly shaped tubercle.

Near its mouth, the salt-and-pepper doris has small, lobe-like oral tentacles. Its mouth is roofed by a thick, quadrangular mandibular plate and its radula is broad and deeply grooved, with 16-22 rows of 17 teeth.

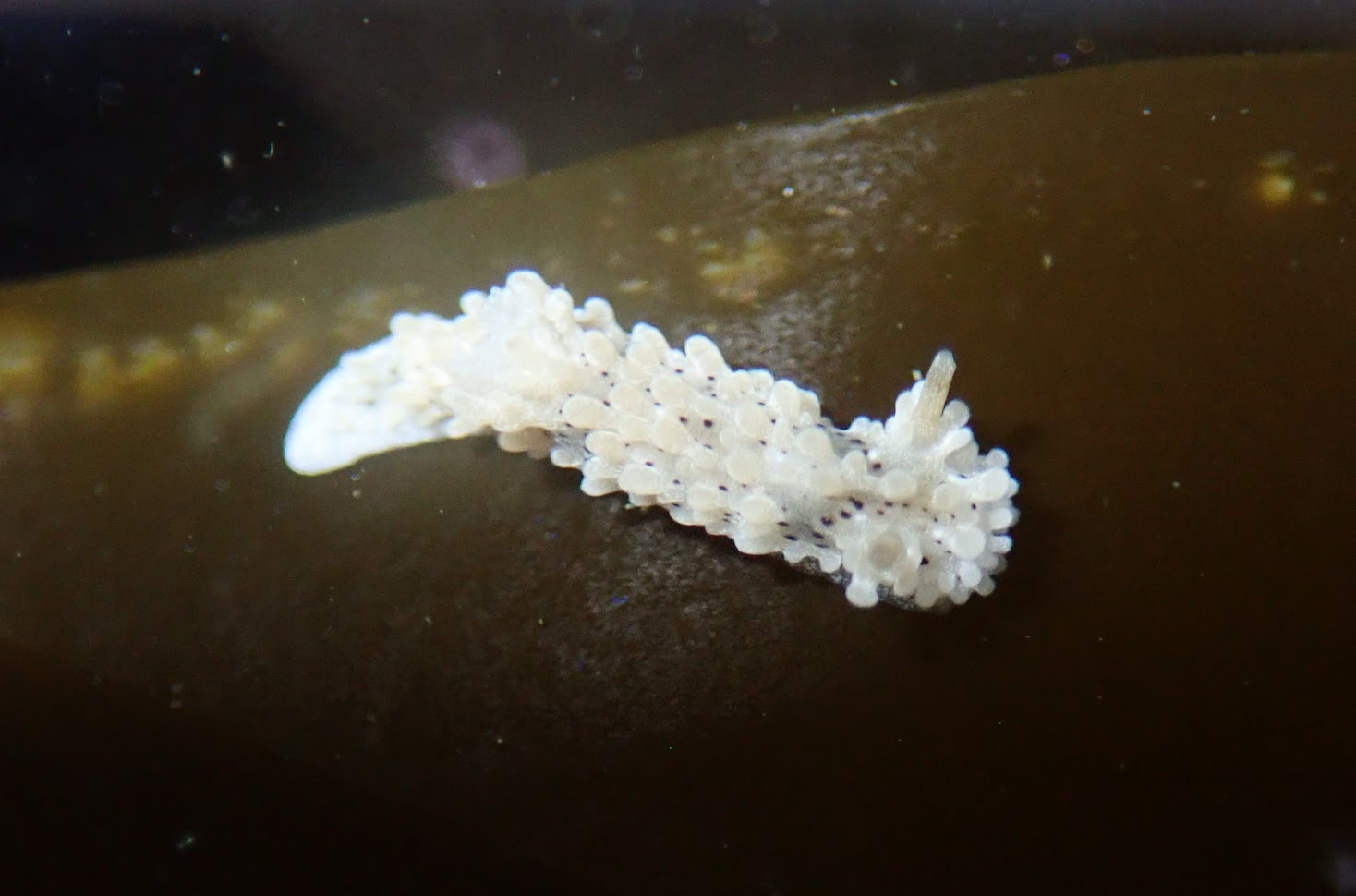
A darker individual, where the white spots are more visible

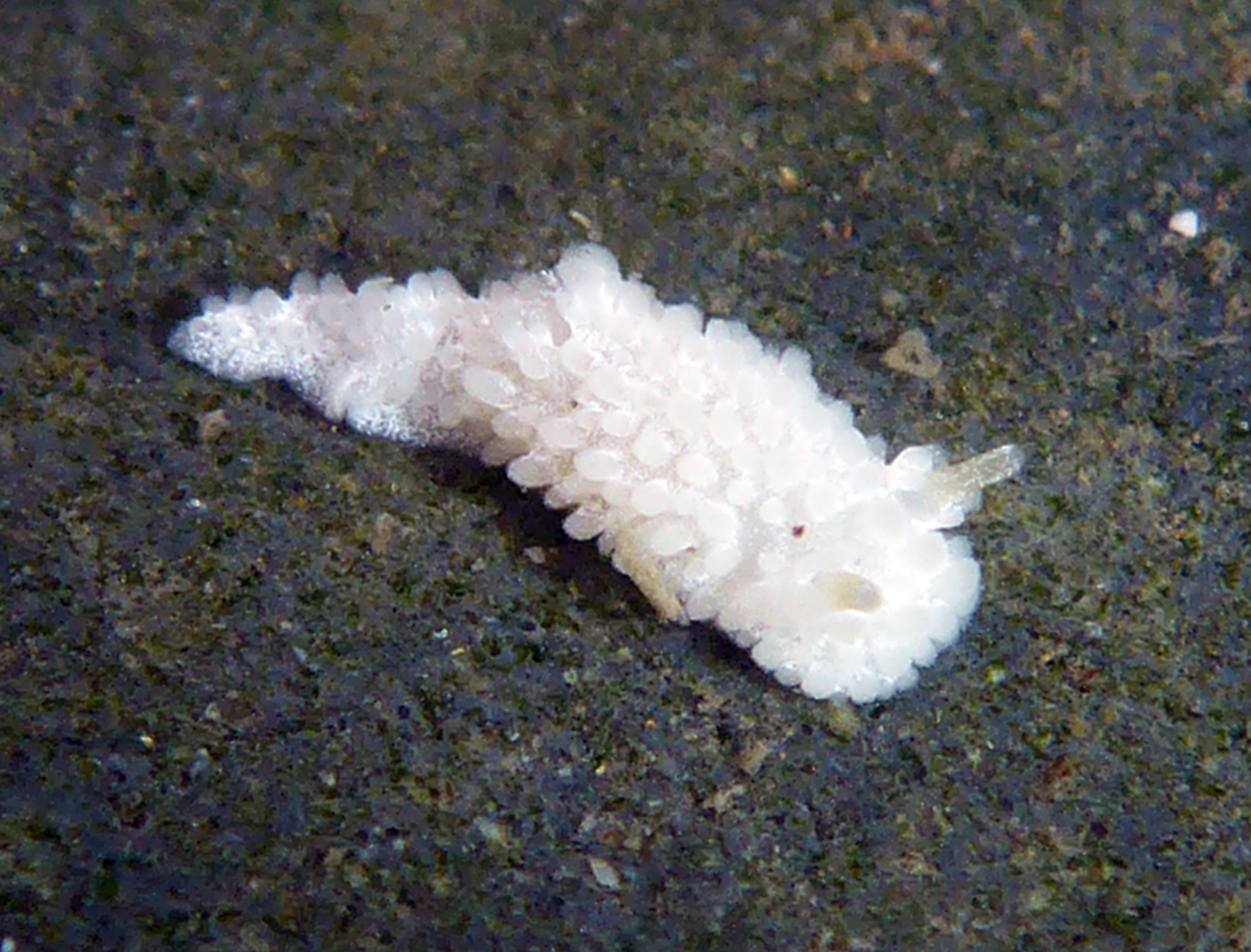
A nearly spotless individual

== Ecology ==
=== Diet ===
The salt-and-pepper doris is specialized to feed exclusively on the calcareous sponges of the genera Leucetta, Leucilla, and possibly Leucosolenia.

=== Reproduction ===
Like all nudibranchs, the salt-and-pepper doris is a simultaneous hermaphrodite. While mating, individuals wrestle for dominance, attempting to penetrate and impregnate the other with their penis, which is lined with small, hooked spines.
