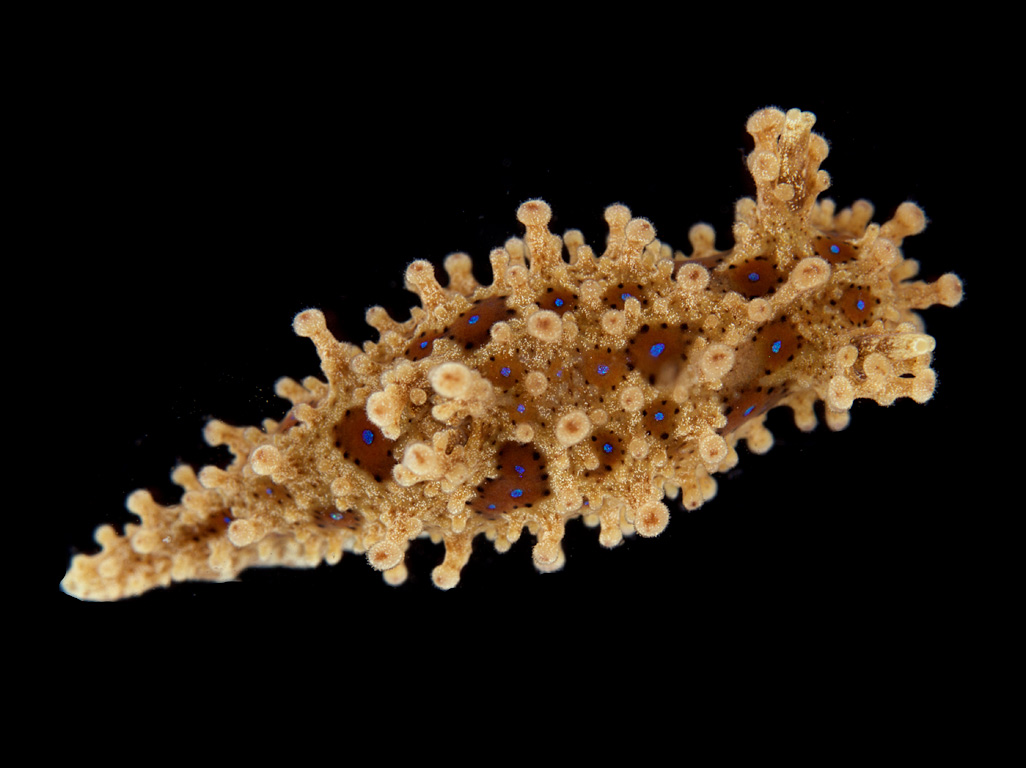
- The nudibranch Aegires punctilucens, Strangford Lough, Co Down, Northern Ireland.

Scientific classification
- Domain: Eukaryota
- Kingdom: Animalia
- Phylum: Mollusca
- Class: Gastropoda
- Order: Nudibranchia
- Superfamily: Polyceroidea
- Family: Aegiridae
- Genus: Aegires
- Species: A. punctilucens

Binomial name
- Aegires punctilucens (d'Orbigny, 1837)

= Aegires punctilucens =

Species of gastropod

Aegires punctilucens is a species of sea slug. It is a dorid nudibranch, a shell-less marine gastropod mollusc in the family Aegiridae.

== Distribution ==
This species was described from Brest, Brittany, France. It has been reported from the NE Atlantic from Norway, Great Britain and Ireland from Shetland south to Cornwall and from Northern France, Portugal and Spain to Greece in the Mediterranean Sea. Reports from Japan and Australia are likely to be cryptic species.

== Description ==
The maximum recorded body length is 12 mm.

== Feeding habits ==
Aegires punctilucens feeds on the calcareous sponge Leucosolenia botryoides.
