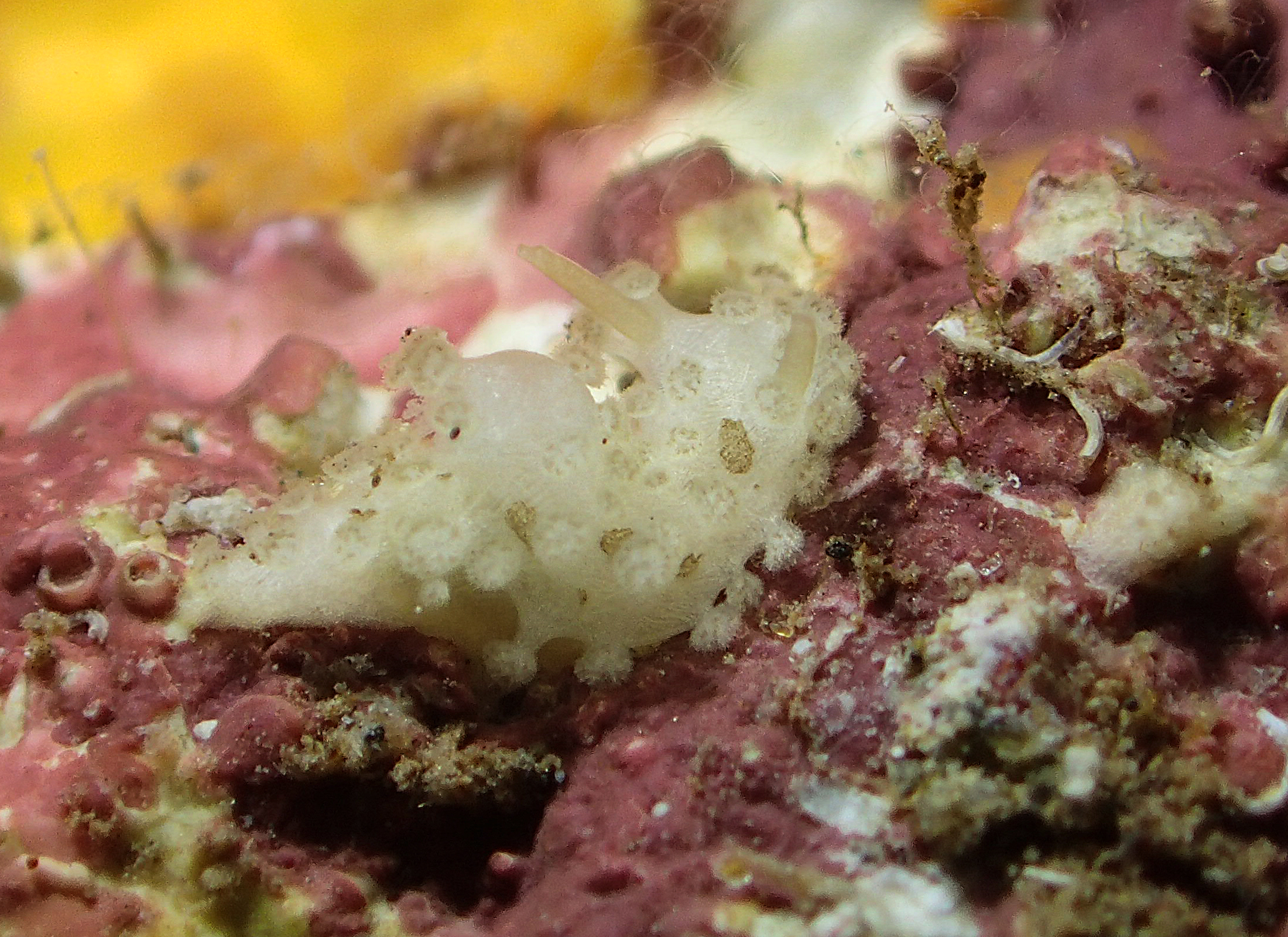

Scientific classification
- Kingdom: Animalia
- Phylum: Mollusca
- Class: Gastropoda
- Order: Nudibranchia
- Family: Aegiridae
- Genus: Aegires
- Species: A. incusus

Binomial name
- Aegires incusus Fahey & Gosliner, 2004

= Aegires incusus =

Species of gastropod

Aegires incusus is a species of sea slug. It is a dorid nudibranch, a shell-less marine gastropod mollusc in the family Aegiridae.

== Distribution ==
This species was described from Mora Mora, Tulear, Madagascar. It has also been reported from the Philippine Islands and Japan.
