= Leucetta villosa =

Scientific classification
- Domain: Eukaryota
- Kingdom: Animalia
- Phylum: Porifera
- Class: Calcarea
- Order: Clathrinida
- Family: Leucettidae
- Genus: Leucetta
- Species: L. villosa

Binomial name
- Leucetta villosa Wörheide & Hooper, 1999

Species of sponge

Holotype site (south side of Wistari Reef)'"`UNIQ--ref-00000007-QINU`"'

Leucetta villosa is a species of calcareous sponge in the family Leucettidae, and was first described in 1999 by Gert Wörheide and John Hooper. The species epithet, villosa, comes from the Latin, villosus ("hairy"), and was given because of the "hair-like extensions on the sponge surface".

It is found in Queensland coastal waters, where occurs in waters with surface temperatures of 20 to 25 °C.
