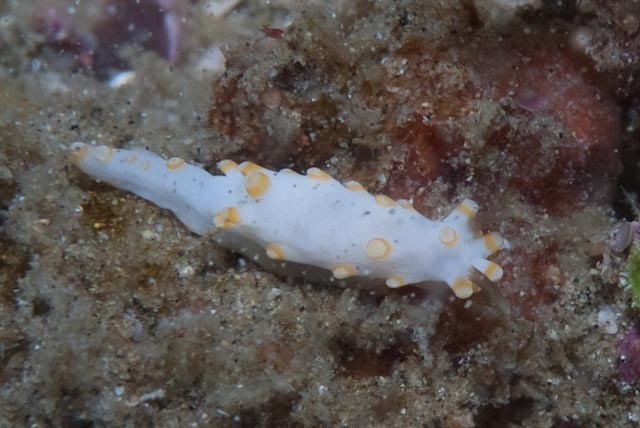

Scientific classification
- Kingdom: Animalia
- Phylum: Mollusca
- Class: Gastropoda
- Order: Nudibranchia
- Family: Aegiridae
- Genus: Aegires
- Species: A. lemoncello

Binomial name
- Aegires lemoncello Fahey & Gosliner, 2004

= Aegires lemoncello =

Species of gastropod

Aegires lemoncello is a species of sea slug. It is a dorid nudibranch, a shell-less marine gastropod mollusc in the family Aegiridae.

== Distribution ==
This species was described from Barracuda Point, Pig Island, Madang, Papua New Guinea. It has also been reported from New Caledonia and South Africa.
