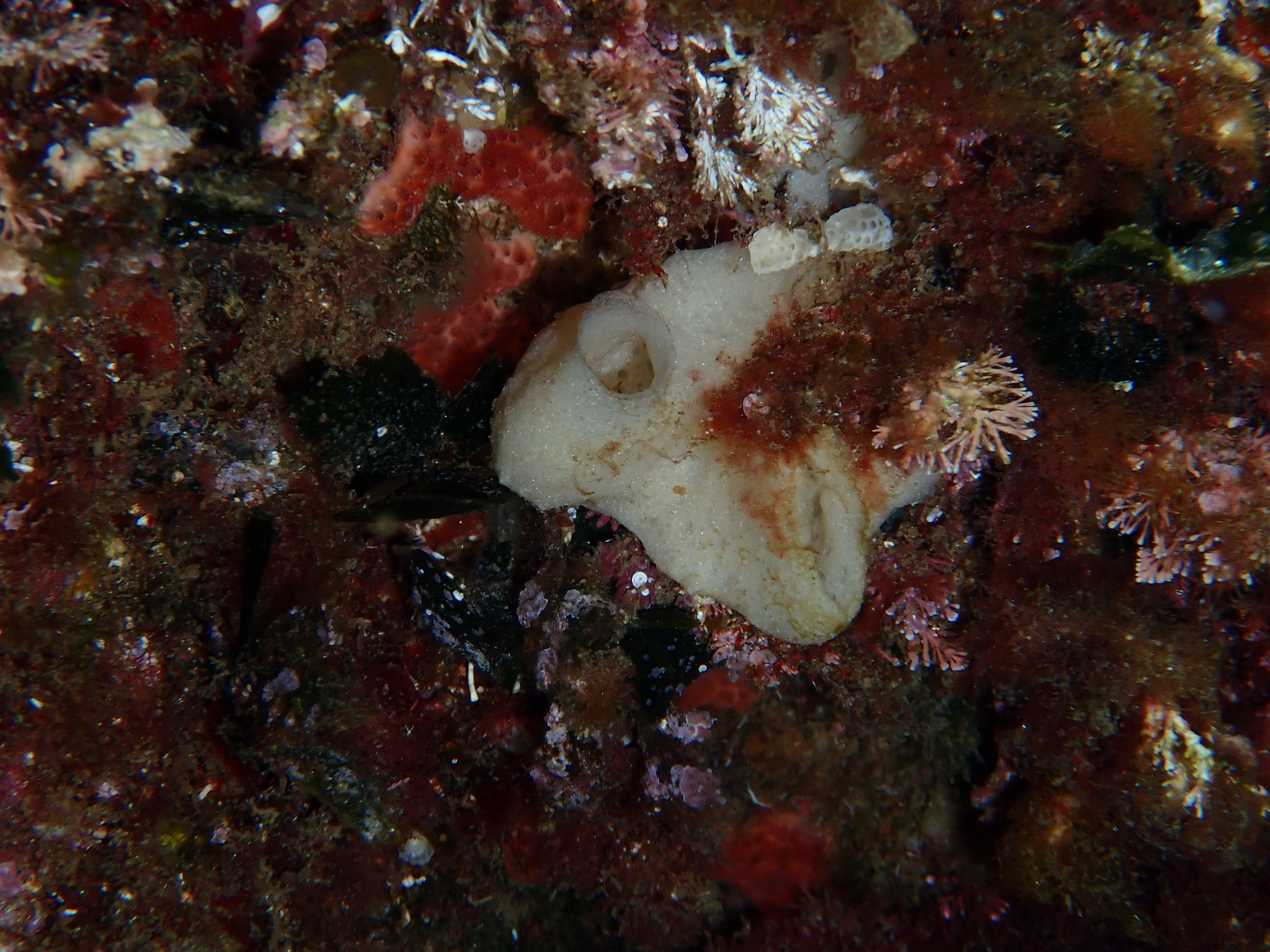

Scientific classification
- Kingdom: Animalia
- Phylum: Porifera
- Class: Calcarea
- Order: Clathrinida
- Family: Leucettidae
- Genus: Leucetta
- Species: L. solida

Binomial name
- Leucetta solida Schmidt, 1862

= Leucetta solida =

Species of sponge

Leucetta solida is a species of calcareous sponge in the family Leucettidae, and was first described in 1862 by Eduard Oscar Schmidt.
