= Aegires palensis =

Scientific classification
- Kingdom: Animalia
- Phylum: Mollusca
- Class: Gastropoda
- Order: Nudibranchia
- Family: Aegiridae
- Genus: Aegires
- Species: A. palensis

Binomial name
- Aegires palensis Ortea, Luque & Templado, 1990

Species of gastropod

Aegires palensis is a species of sea slug, a nudibranch, a marine, opisthobranch gastropod mollusk in the family Aegiridae.

== Distribution ==
This species was described from a single 9 mm long specimen found in a sample of organic detritus at 34m depth at Bajo de Dentro, Cabo de Palos, Spain, 37°40′N 0°40′W.
