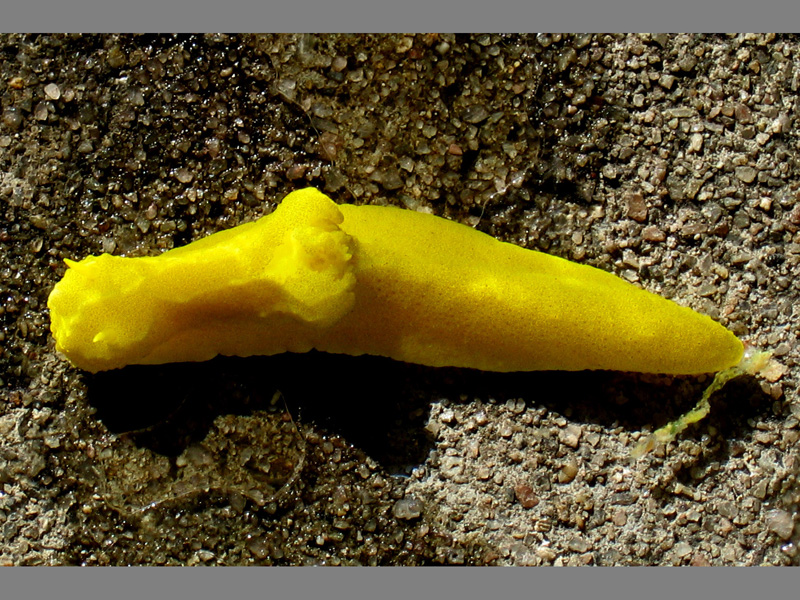

Scientific classification
- Kingdom: Animalia
- Phylum: Mollusca
- Class: Gastropoda
- Order: Nudibranchia
- Family: Aegiridae
- Genus: Aegires
- Species: A. citrinus

Binomial name
- Aegires citrinus Pruvot-Fol 1930

Synonyms
- Aegires pruvotfolae Fahey & Gosliner, 2004

= Aegires citrinus =

Species of gastropod

Aegires citrinus is a species of sea slug, a nudibranch, a marine, opisthobranch gastropod mollusk in the family Aegiridae.

== Distribution ==
This species was described from New Caledonia. It is common in Eastern Australia and known from the Philippines. Aegris citrinus has also been found at Cabilao Island, Philippines.

== Description ==
Aegris Citrinus is a nudibranch whose length averages about 14 mm. Its coloration may be translucent, white, or a bright yellow. This depends on the sponges it eats.
