= Aegires hapsis =

Scientific classification
- Kingdom: Animalia
- Phylum: Mollusca
- Class: Gastropoda
- Order: Nudibranchia
- Family: Aegiridae
- Genus: Aegires
- Species: A. hapsis

Binomial name
- Aegires hapsis Fahey & Gosliner, 2004

Species of gastropod

Aegires hapsis is a species of sea slug. It is a dorid nudibranch, a shell-less marine gastropod mollusc in the family Aegiridae.

== Distribution ==
This species was described from Horseshoe Cliffs, Okinawa, Ryukyu Islands. It has also been reported from Queensland, Australia and probably has a wider Indo-Pacific distribution.
