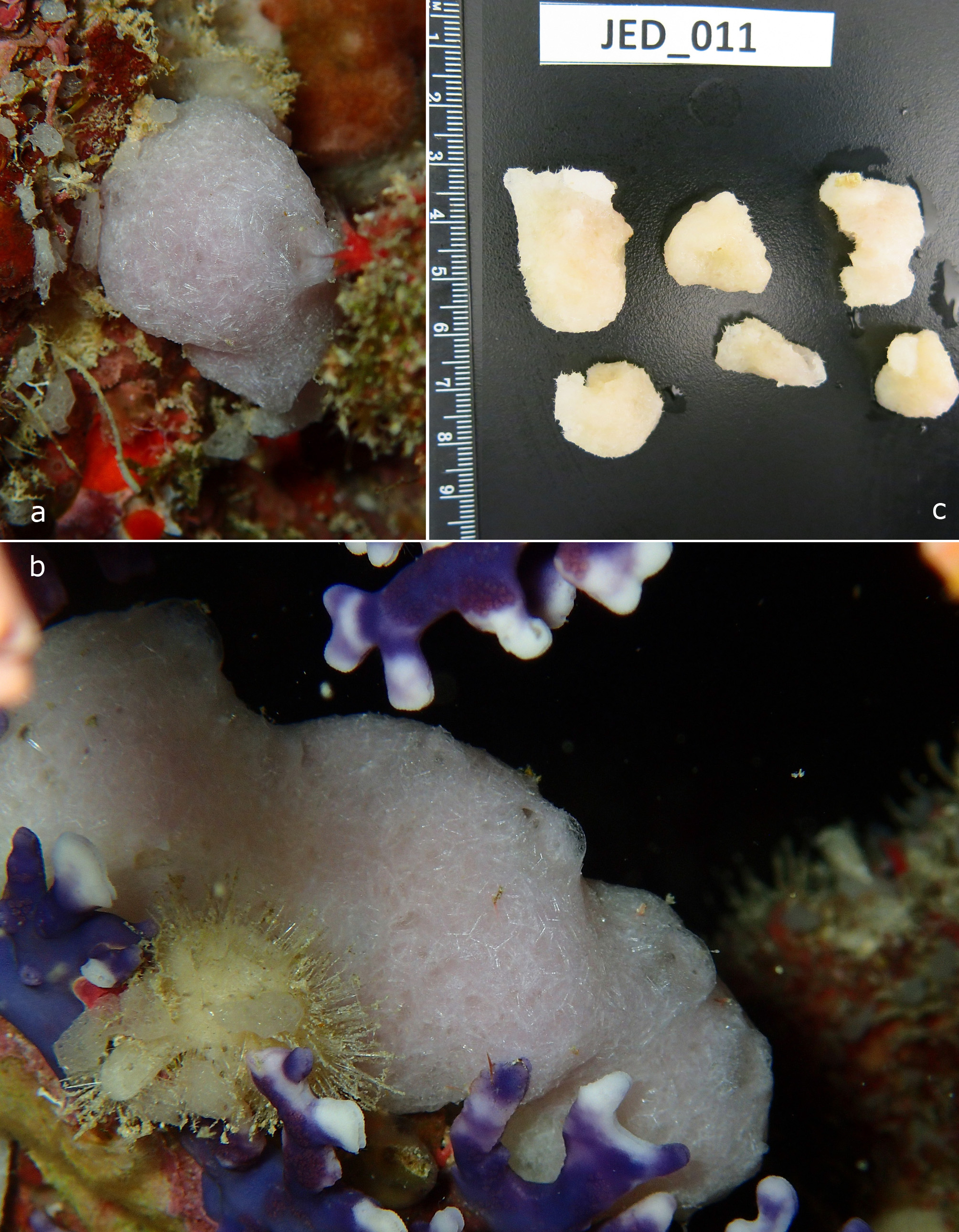

Scientific classification
- Kingdom: Animalia
- Phylum: Porifera
- Class: Calcarea
- Order: Clathrinida
- Family: Leucettidae
- Genus: Leucetta
- Species: L. pyriformis

Binomial name
- Leucetta pyriformis Dendy, 1913

= Leucetta pyriformis =

Species of sponge

Leucetta pyriformis is a species of calcareous sponge in the family Leucettidae, and was first described in 1913 by Arthur Dendy.
