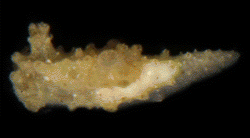
- Dorsal view of Aegires ortizi

Scientific classification
- Kingdom: Animalia
- Phylum: Mollusca
- Class: Gastropoda
- Order: Nudibranchia
- Family: Aegiridae
- Genus: Aegires
- Species: A. ortizi

Binomial name
- Aegires ortizi Templado, Luque & Ortea, 1987

= Aegires ortizi =

Species of gastropod

Aegires ortizi is a species of sea slug, a nudibranch, a marine, opisthobranch gastropod mollusk in the family Aegiridae.

The specific name ortizi is in honour of Dr. Manuel Ortiz from the Center for Marine Research, University of Havana.

== Distribution ==
The distribution of Aegires ortizi includes the Cayman Islands, the Bahamas, Venezuela, Cuba and Panama.

== Description ==
The body is elongate. The tubercles are large, varying from conical to mushroom-shaped, with flat tops in some individuals. Gill leaves forming a semicircle on the posterior portion of the dorsum. The background color is usually mottled white, sometimes with noticeable brown spots. It can be up to 8 mm long.

== Ecology ==
Minimum recorded depth is 2 m. Maximum recorded depth is 5 m.

A single specimen was found on cyanobacteria over coral rubble and sand patches in the Bocas del Toro Archipelago, Panama. In the Bahamas, this species has been found on algae of the genera Cladophora and Sargassum.
