= Aegires sublaevis =

Scientific classification
- Kingdom: Animalia
- Phylum: Mollusca
- Class: Gastropoda
- Order: Nudibranchia
- Family: Aegiridae
- Genus: Aegires
- Species: A. sublaevis

Binomial name
- Aegires sublaevis Odhner, 1932

Species of gastropod

Aegires sublaevis is a species of sea slug, a nudibranch, a marine, opisthobranch gastropod mollusk in the family Aegiridae.

== Distribution ==
This species was described from Puerto de Orotavo, Tenerife, Canary Islands. It has been reported from the Azores, Portugal, Spain and the Mediterranean Sea as well as the more distant localities of Panama and the Galapagos Islands. However a study of Caribbean specimens showed that there were several similar species in that area.

== Ecology ==
Aegires sublaevis has been reported to feed on the calcareous sponge Clathrina clathrus, on which it is camouflaged by its yellow ground colour and brown spots which mimic the oscules of the sponge.
