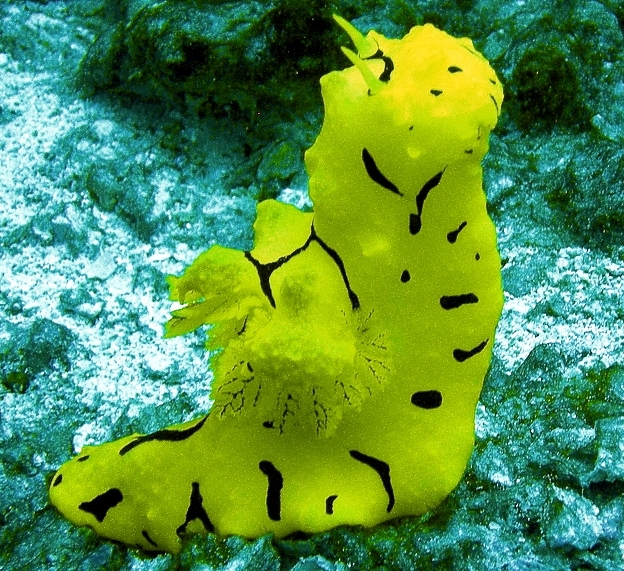
- Notodoris minor

Scientific classification
- Kingdom: Animalia
- Phylum: Mollusca
- Class: Gastropoda
- Order: Nudibranchia
- Family: Aegiridae
- Genus: Notodoris; Bergh, 1875

Type species
- Notodoris citrina Bergh, 1875

= Notodoris =

Genus of gastropods

Notodoris is a genus of sea slugs, dorid nudibranchs, marine gastropod molluscs in the family Aegiridae. It has been treated as a synonym of Aegires but re-established on the basis of radula and jaw characters.

== Species ==
Species in the genus Notodoris include:

- Notodoris citrina Bergh, 1875 - type species
- Notodoris gardineri Eliot, 1906
- Notodoris lanzarotensis Moro & Ortea, 2015
- Notodoris minor Eliot, 1904
- Notodoris serenae Gosliner & Behrens, 1997

Species considered to be synonyms:

- Notodoris megastigmata Allan, 1932 Notodoris gardineri Eliot, 1906
