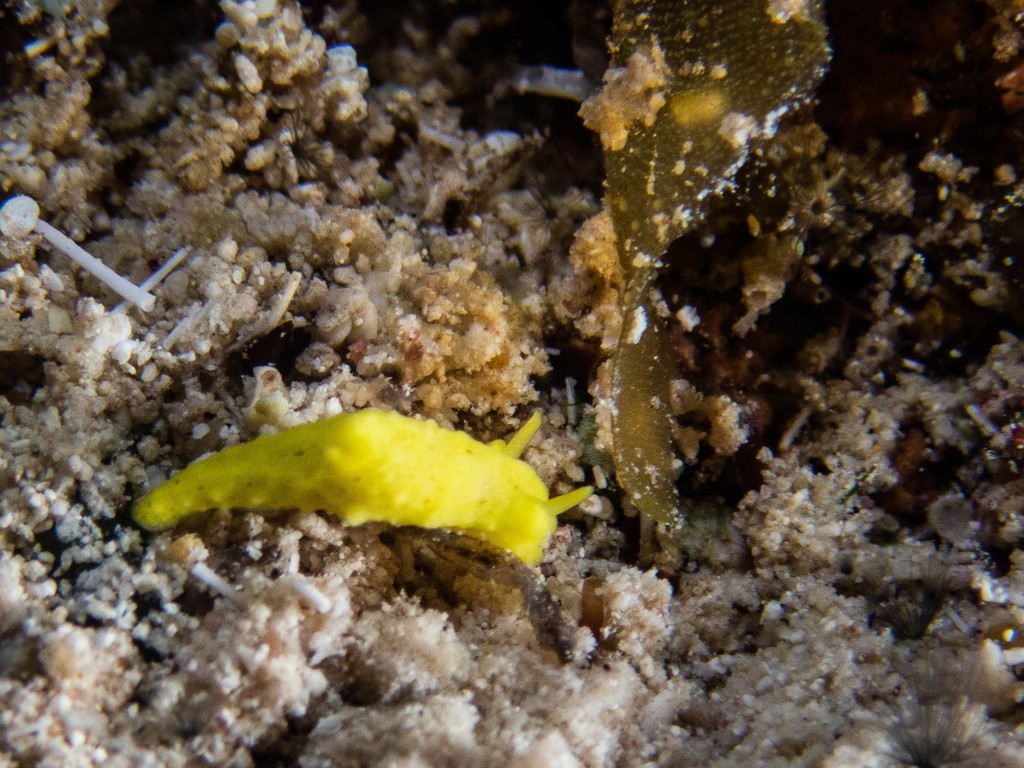

Scientific classification
- Kingdom: Animalia
- Phylum: Mollusca
- Class: Gastropoda
- Order: Nudibranchia
- Family: Aegiridae
- Genus: Aegires
- Species: A. corrugatus

Binomial name
- Aegires corrugatus Ortea, Moro & Espinosa 2015

= Aegires corrugatus =

Species of gastropod

Aegires corrugatus is a species of sea slug, a nudibranch, a marine, opisthobranch gastropod mollusc in the family Aegiridae.

== Distribution ==
This species was described from Cuba. It has been reported from Guadeloupe and Martinique.
