= Aegires leuckartii =

Scientific classification
- Kingdom: Animalia
- Phylum: Mollusca
- Class: Gastropoda
- Order: Nudibranchia
- Family: Aegiridae
- Genus: Aegires
- Species: A. leuckartii

Binomial name
- Aegires leuckartii Vérany, 1853

Species of gastropod

Aegires leuckartii is a species of sea slug, a nudibranch, a marine, opisthobranch gastropod mollusk in the family Aegiridae.

== Distribution ==
This species was described from Nice, on the Mediterranean Sea coast of France.; also off Corsica. It has only been found on the French and Spanish coasts of the Mediterranean.
