= Aegires albus =

Scientific classification
- Kingdom: Animalia
- Phylum: Mollusca
- Class: Gastropoda
- Order: Nudibranchia
- Family: Aegiridae
- Genus: Aegires
- Species: A. albus

Binomial name
- Aegires albus Thiele, 1912

Synonyms
- Aegires protectus (Odhner, 1934); Anaegires protectus Odhner, 1934

Species of gastropod

Aegires albus is a species of sea slug, a nudibranch, a marine, opisthobranch gastropod mollusk in the family Aegiridae. Its synonym Anaegires protectus Odhner, 1934 is the type species of the genus Anaegires Odhner, 1934 which was merged with Aegires by Wägele in 1987.

== Distribution ==
This species was described from Antarctica. It has only been reported from the Antarctic Peninsula, Weddell Sea and Ross Sea.

== Description ==
Aegires albus was redescribed by Wägele (1987) and by Troncoso et al. (1996).
