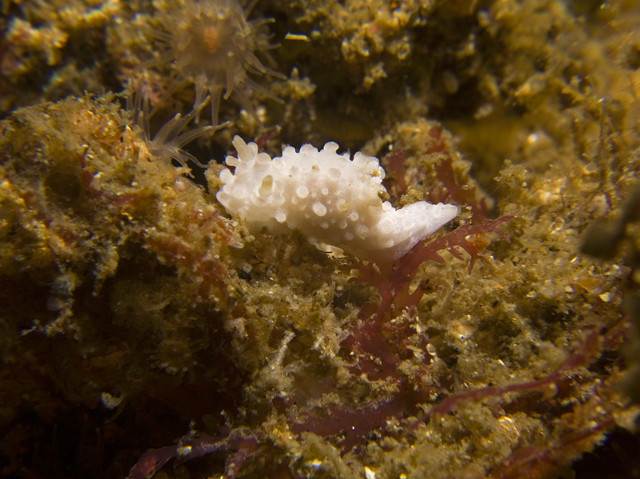

Scientific classification
- Kingdom: Animalia
- Phylum: Mollusca
- Class: Gastropoda
- Order: Nudibranchia
- Family: Aegiridae
- Genus: Aegires
- Species: A. ninguis

Binomial name
- Aegires ninguis Fahey & Gosliner, 2004

= Aegires ninguis =

Knobbly nudibranch Aegires ninguis

Species of gastropod

The knobbly nudibranch, Aegires ninguis, is a species of dorid nudibranch. It is marine gastropod mollusc in the family Aegiridae.

== Distribution ==
This species is found off the South African coast from the Atlantic coast of the Cape Peninsula to Port Elizabeth. It is found from the intertidal to at least 30 m. It is endemic.

== Description ==
The knobbly nudibranch is a small (up to 15 mm) white-bodied dorid with numerous knobbles projecting from its body. Its rhinophores emerge from knobbled sheaths.

== Ecology ==
This species may feed on encrusting sponges.
