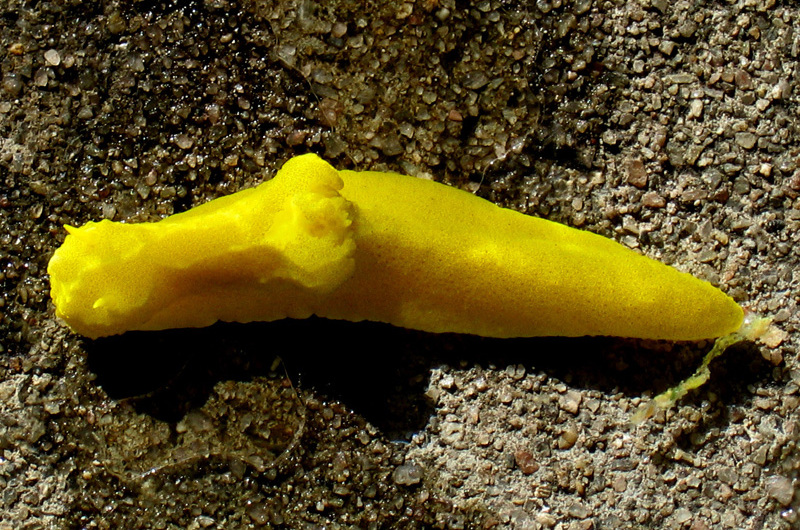

Scientific classification
- Kingdom: Animalia
- Phylum: Mollusca
- Class: Gastropoda
- Order: Nudibranchia
- Family: Aegiridae
- Genus: Notodoris
- Species: N. citrina

Binomial name
- Notodoris citrina Bergh, 1875

Synonyms
- Aegires citrina (Bergh, 1875)

= Notodoris citrina =

Species of gastropod

Notodoris citrina is a species of sea slug. It is a dorid nudibranch, a shell-less marine gastropod mollusc in the family Aegiridae.

== Distribution ==
This species was described from Rarotonga, Cook Islands. It lives in the Indo-west Pacific area, where it has been found in Queensland, Australia; Indonesia, the Marshall Islands, Papua New Guinea and New Caledonia.

== Description ==
Notodoris citrina can grow to 60 mm in length. It is entirely yellow in colour. There are raised yellow tubercles all over the body and three fused extra-brachial appendages which shelter the gills. The rhinophores are also yellow in adults but black in juveniles.

== Diet ==
Notodoris citrina feeds on calcareous sponges belonging to the family Leucettidae.
