= Aegires incisus =

Scientific classification
- Kingdom: Animalia
- Phylum: Mollusca
- Class: Gastropoda
- Order: Nudibranchia
- Family: Aegiridae
- Genus: Aegires
- Species: A. incisus

Binomial name
- Aegires incisus (Sars, 1872)

Synonyms
- Triopa incisa basionym Triopella incisa

Species of gastropod

Aegires incisus is a species of sea slug, a nudibranch, a marine, opisthobranch gastropod mollusk in the family Aegiridae.

== Distribution ==
This species was described from Norway. It is redescribed by Fahey & Gosliner, (2004).
