= Aegires flores =

Scientific classification
- Kingdom: Animalia
- Phylum: Mollusca
- Class: Gastropoda
- Order: Nudibranchia
- Family: Aegiridae
- Genus: Aegires
- Species: A. flores

Binomial name
- Aegires flores Fahey & Gosliner, 2004

Species of gastropod

Aegires flores is a species of sea slug. It is a dorid nudibranch, a shell-less marine gastropod mollusc in the family Aegiridae.

== Distribution ==
This species was described from Enewetak Atoll, Marshall Islands. It has also been reported from Papua New Guinea, Sulawesi, the Philippine Islands, and from Japan.
