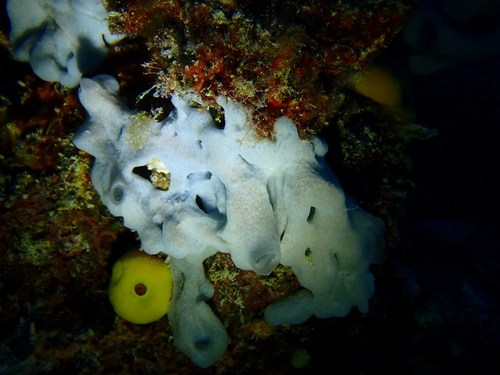

Scientific classification
- Kingdom: Animalia
- Phylum: Porifera
- Class: Calcarea
- Order: Clathrinida
- Family: Leucettidae
- Genus: Leucetta
- Species: L. sulcata

Binomial name
- Leucetta sulcata Van Soest & De Voogd, 2018

= Leucetta sulcata =

Species of sponge

Leucetta sulcata is a species of calcareous sponge in the family Leucettidae, and was first described in 2018 by Van Soest & De Voogd.
