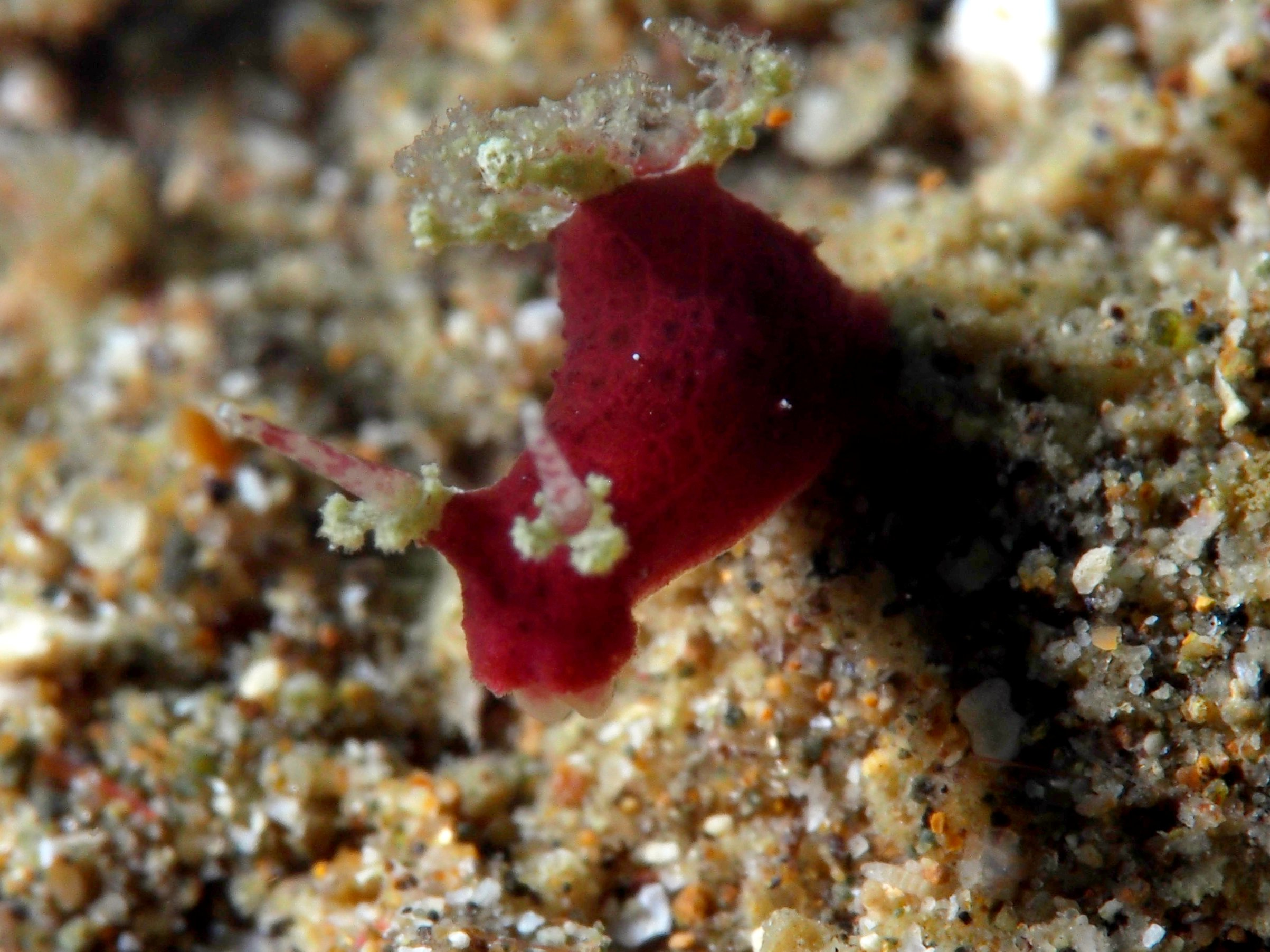

Scientific classification
- Kingdom: Animalia
- Phylum: Mollusca
- Class: Gastropoda
- Order: Nudibranchia
- Family: Aegiridae
- Genus: Aegires
- Species: A. malinus

Binomial name
- Aegires malinus Fahey & Gosliner, 2004

= Aegires malinus =

Species of gastropod

Aegires malinus is a species of sea slug. It is a dorid nudibranch, a shell-less marine gastropod mollusc in the family Aegiridae.

== Distribution ==
This species was described from Bebbit, Batangas Region, Philippines. It has also been reported from Okinawa, Japan.
