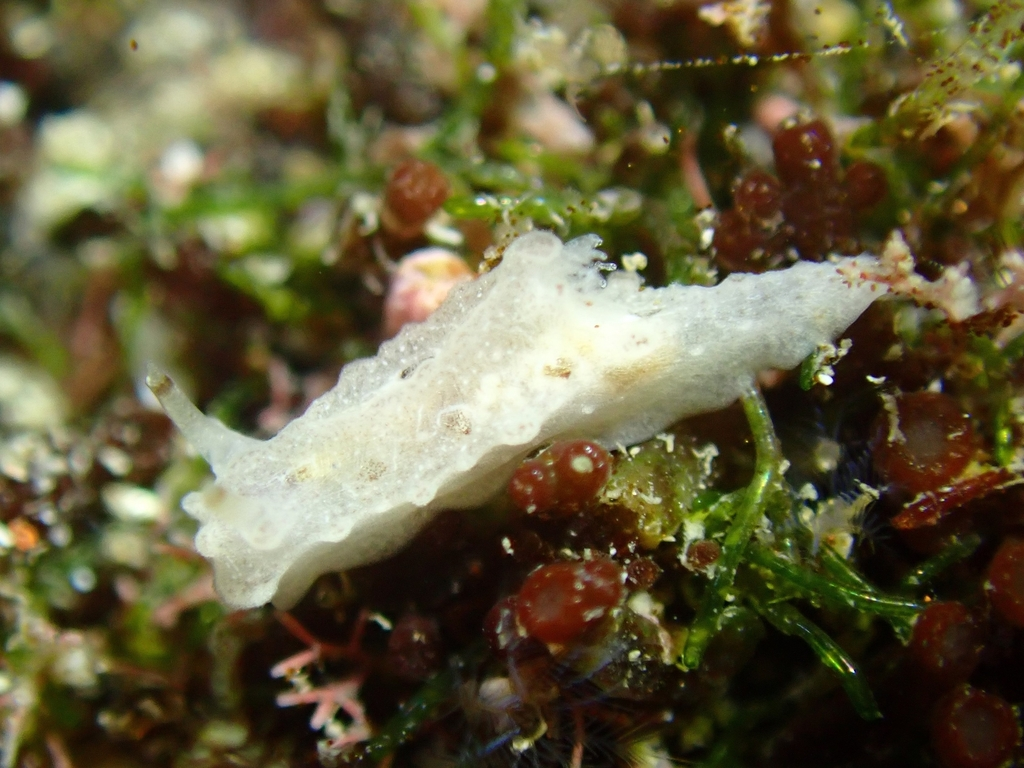

Scientific classification
- Kingdom: Animalia
- Phylum: Mollusca
- Class: Gastropoda
- Order: Nudibranchia
- Family: Aegiridae
- Genus: Notodoris
- Species: N. lanzarotensis

Binomial name
- Notodoris lanzarotensis Moro & Ortea, 2015

= Notodoris lanzarotensis =

Species of gastropod

Notodoris lanzarotensis is a species of sea slugs. It is a dorid nudibranch, a shell-less marine gastropod mollusc in the family Aegiridae.

== Distribution ==
This species was described from Lanzarote, Canary Islands.
