= Aegires gomezi =

Scientific classification
- Kingdom: Animalia
- Phylum: Mollusca
- Class: Gastropoda
- Order: Nudibranchia
- Family: Aegiridae
- Genus: Aegires
- Species: A. gomezi

Binomial name
- Aegires gomezi Ortea, Luque & Templado, 1990

Species of gastropod

Aegires gomezi is a species of sea slug, a nudibranch, a marine, opisthobranch gastropod mollusk in the family Aegiridae. It can be differentiated from can be other Atlantic species of this genus by its colour pattern, its labial armature with different series of rods, its isolated mushroom-shaped tubercles, the ridges on its mantle, and its rapid body movements.

== Distribution ==
This species was described from a single specimen found under a stone at 1 m depth at the natural pool of Hotel Comodoro, Havana, Cuba, 23°6′N 82°26′W.
