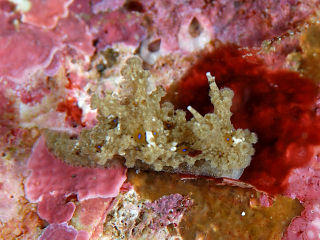

Scientific classification
- Kingdom: Animalia
- Phylum: Mollusca
- Class: Gastropoda
- Order: Nudibranchia
- Family: Aegiridae
- Genus: Aegires
- Species: A. exeches

Binomial name
- Aegires exeches Fahey & Gosliner, 2004

= Aegires exeches =

Species of gastropod

Aegires exeches is a species of sea slug. It is a dorid nudibranch, a shell-less marine gastropod mollusc in the family Aegiridae.

== Distribution ==
This species was described from Hekili Point, Maui, Hawaii. It has been reported from Japan, Papua New Guinea, the Marshall Islands and the Great Barrier Reef, Australia.
