= Aegires petalis =

Scientific classification
- Kingdom: Animalia
- Phylum: Mollusca
- Class: Gastropoda
- Order: Nudibranchia
- Family: Aegiridae
- Genus: Aegires
- Species: A. petalis

Binomial name
- Aegires petalis Fahey & Gosliner, 2004

Species of gastropod

Aegires petalis is a species of sea slug. It is a dorid nudibranch, a shell-less marine gastropod mollusc in the family Aegiridae.

== Distribution ==
This species was described from Anemone Reef, Madang, Papua New Guinea. It has also been reported from Japan.
