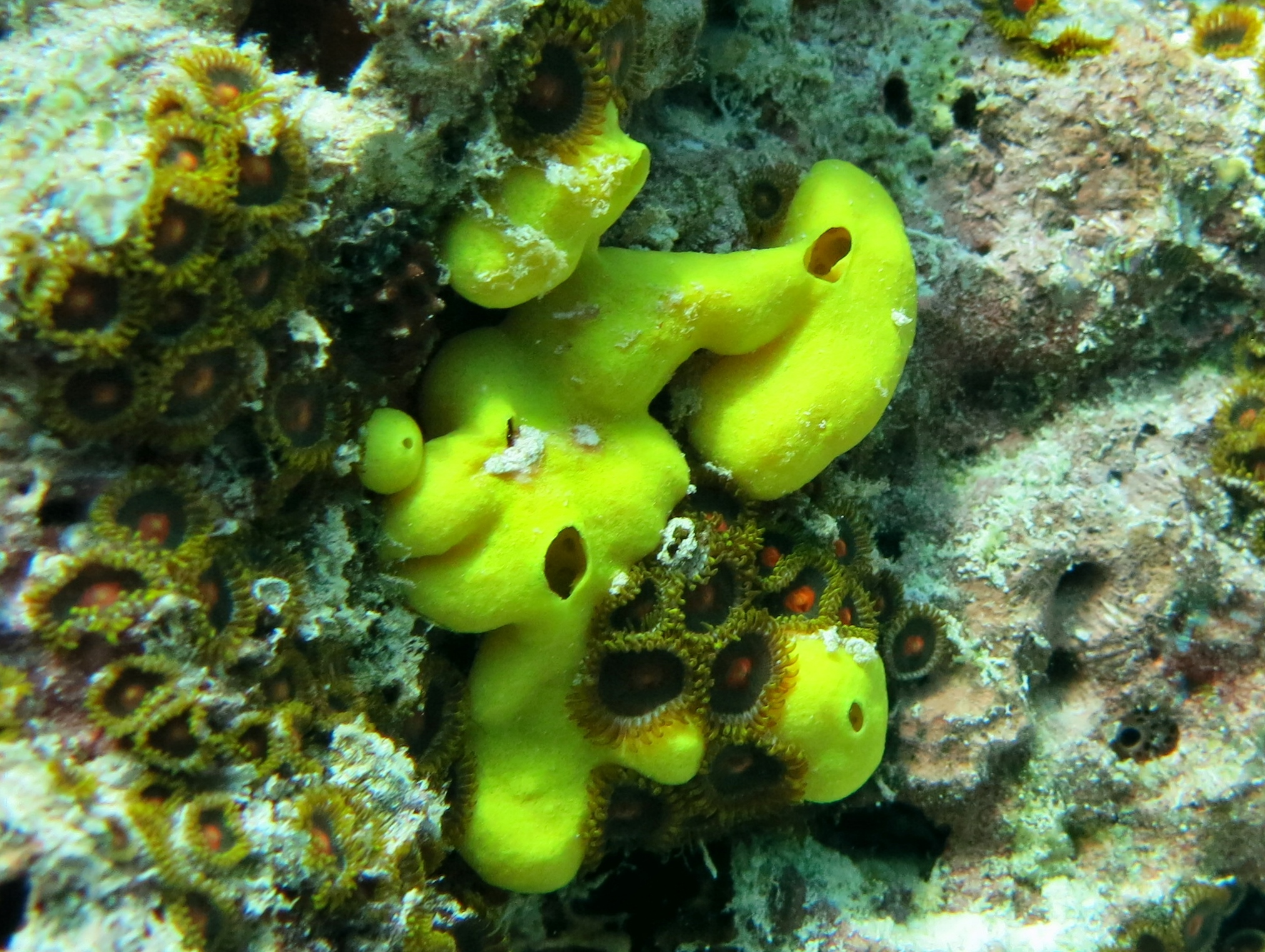

Scientific classification
- Kingdom: Animalia
- Phylum: Porifera
- Class: Calcarea
- Order: Clathrinida
- Family: Leucettidae
- Genus: Leucetta
- Species: L. chagosensis

Binomial name
- Leucetta chagosensis Dendy, 1913

Synonyms
- Leucetta infrequens Row & Hôzawa, 1931

= Leucetta chagosensis =

Species of sponge

Holotype site (Diego Garcia)'"`UNIQ--ref-00000008-QINU`"'

Leucetta chagosensis, also called the lemon sponge, is a species of calcareous sponge in the family Leucettidae, and was first described in 1913 by Arthur Dendy. The species epithet, chagosensis, comes from the Latin with the ending -ensis indicating that the species comes from the Chagos Archipelago in the Indian Ocean. The taxonomic decision for synonymy is based on Maurice Burton (1963).

== Distribution ==
It is found in Queensland and Western Australian coastal waters, in coastal waters of the Indian and the western Pacific Ocean, where the water temperature ranges from 20 to 30 C, the depth from 0–50 m, and salinities from 30 to 35 PSU.
