= Pericharax =

Scientific classification
- Domain: Eukaryota
- Kingdom: Animalia
- Phylum: Porifera
- Class: Calcarea
- Order: Clathrinida
- Family: Leucettidae
- Genus: Pericharax; Poléjaeff, 1883

Genus of sponges

Pericharax is a genus of sponges in the family Leucettidae, which was first described in 1883 by Poléjaeff.

== Species ==
Species:

- Pericharax canaliculata Burton & Rao, 1932
- Pericharax carteri Poléjaeff, 1883
- Pericharax crypta Leocorny, Alencar, Fromont & Klautau, 2016
- Pericharax heteroraphis Poléjaeff, 1883
- Pericharax orientalis Van Soest & De Voogd, 2015
- Pericharax peziza Dendy, 1913
- Pericharax pyriformis Burton, 1932
- Pericharax vallii Leocorny, Alencar, Fromont & Klautau, 2016
