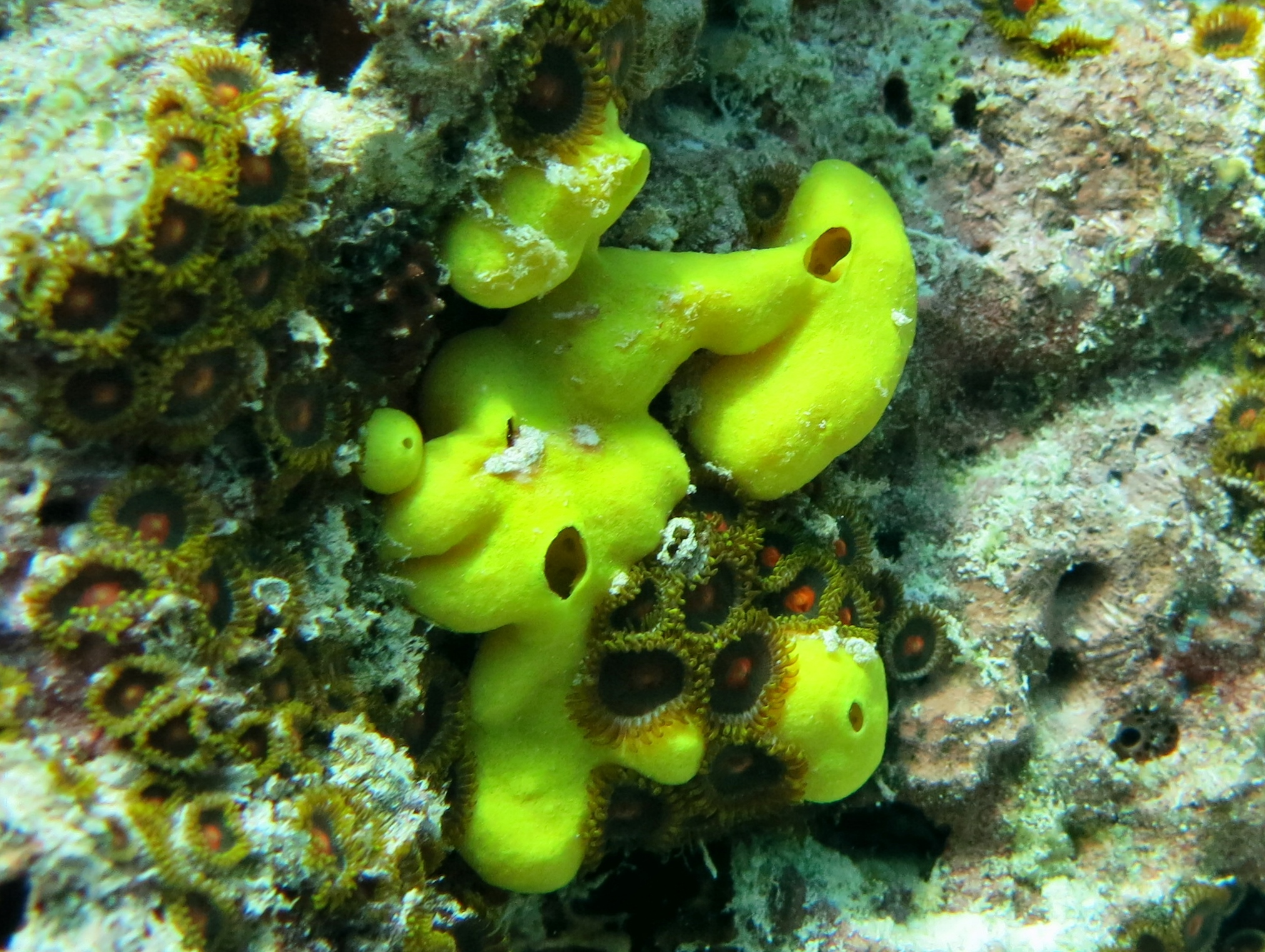
- Leucetta chagosensis
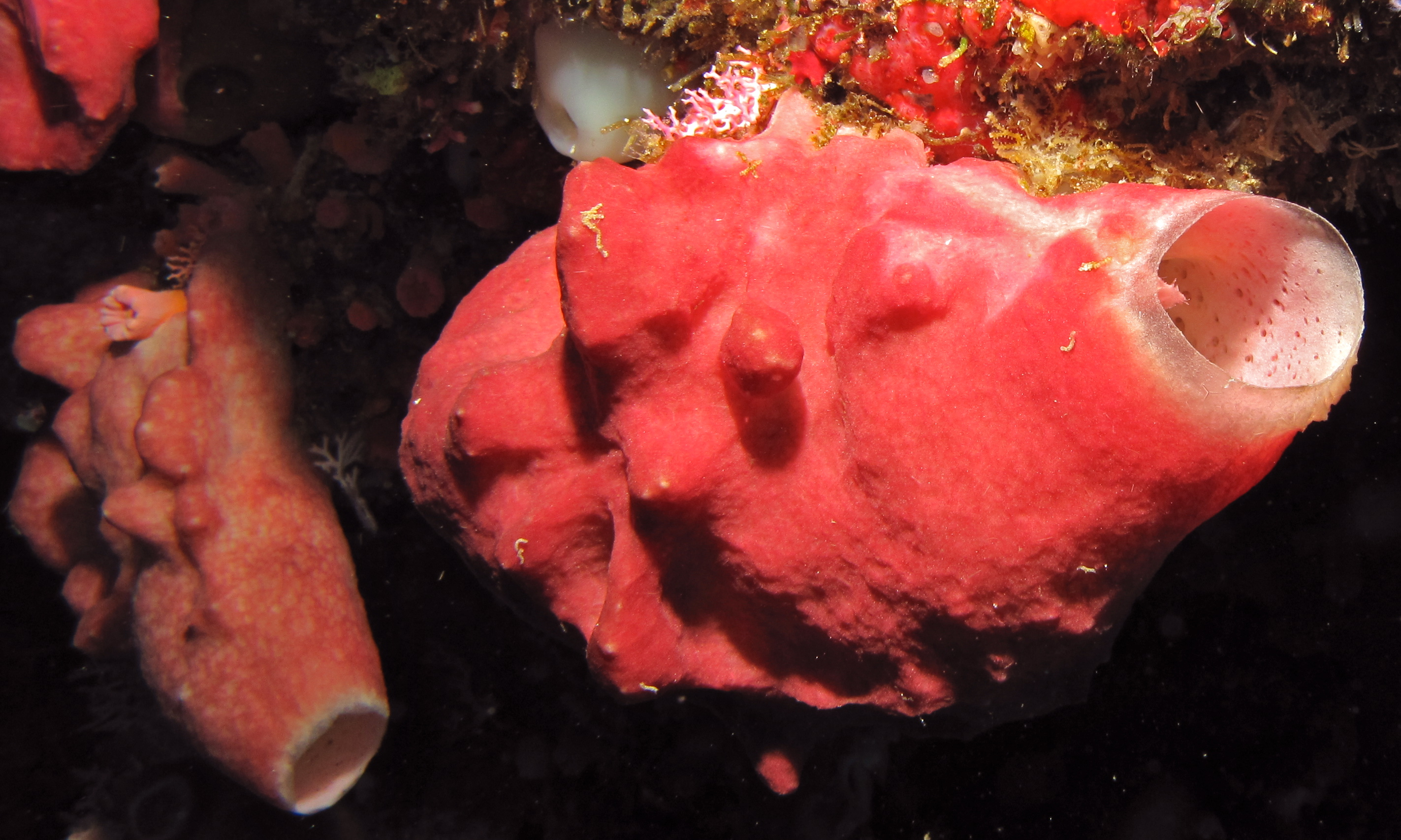
- Leucetta primigenia

Scientific classification
- Domain: Eukaryota
- Kingdom: Animalia
- Phylum: Porifera
- Class: Calcarea
- Order: Clathrinida
- Family: Leucettidae
- Genus: Leucetta; Haeckel, 1872

Synonyms
- Dyssycus Haeckel, 1872; Sycothamnus Haeckel, 1869; Teichonella Carter, 1878

= Leucetta =

Genus of sponges

Leucetta is a genus of sponges in the family Leucettidae, which was first described in 1872 by Ernst Haeckel. The type species is Leucetta primigenia Haeckel, 1872 by subsequent designation.

In Australia, Leucetta species are found off the coasts of New South Wales, Queensland, Victoria, and Western Australia. However, species of this genus are found worldwide.

== Species ==
Accepted species are:

- Leucetta antarctica Dendy, 1918
- Leucetta avocada de Laubenfels, 1954
- Leucetta chagosensis Dendy, 1913
- Leucetta conspicua Klautau, Lopes, Tavares, Rizzieri, Sorokin, Fromont, Goudie, Crowther, McCormack, George & Wahab, 2024
- Leucetta delicata Rapp, Göcke, Tendal & Janussen, 2013
- Leucetta floridana (Haeckel, 1872)
- Leucetta foliata Leocorny, Alencar, Fromont & Klautau, 2016
- Leucetta gelatinosa (Jenkin, 1908)
- Leucetta giribeti Riesgo, Cavalcanti, Kenny, Ríos, Cristobo & Lanna, 2018
- Leucetta homoraphis (Poléjaeff, 1883)
- Leucetta imberbis (Duchassaing & Michelotti, 1864)
- Leucetta insignis Row & Hôzawa, 1931
- Leucetta microraphis Haeckel, 1872
- Leucetta potiguar Lanna, Cavalcanti, Cardoso, Muricy & Klautau, 2009
- Leucetta primigenia Haeckel, 1872
- Leucetta prolifera (Carter, 1878)
- Leucetta purpurea Leocorny, Alencar, Fromont & Klautau, 2016
- Leucetta pyriformis Dendy, 1913
- Leucetta sagittata Haeckel, 1872
- Leucetta solida (Schmidt, 1862)
- Leucetta sulcata Van Soest & De Voogd, 2018
- Leucetta trigona Haeckel, 1872
- Leucetta villosa Wörheide & Hooper, 1999
- Leucetta weddelliana Rapp, Janussen & Tendal, 2011
