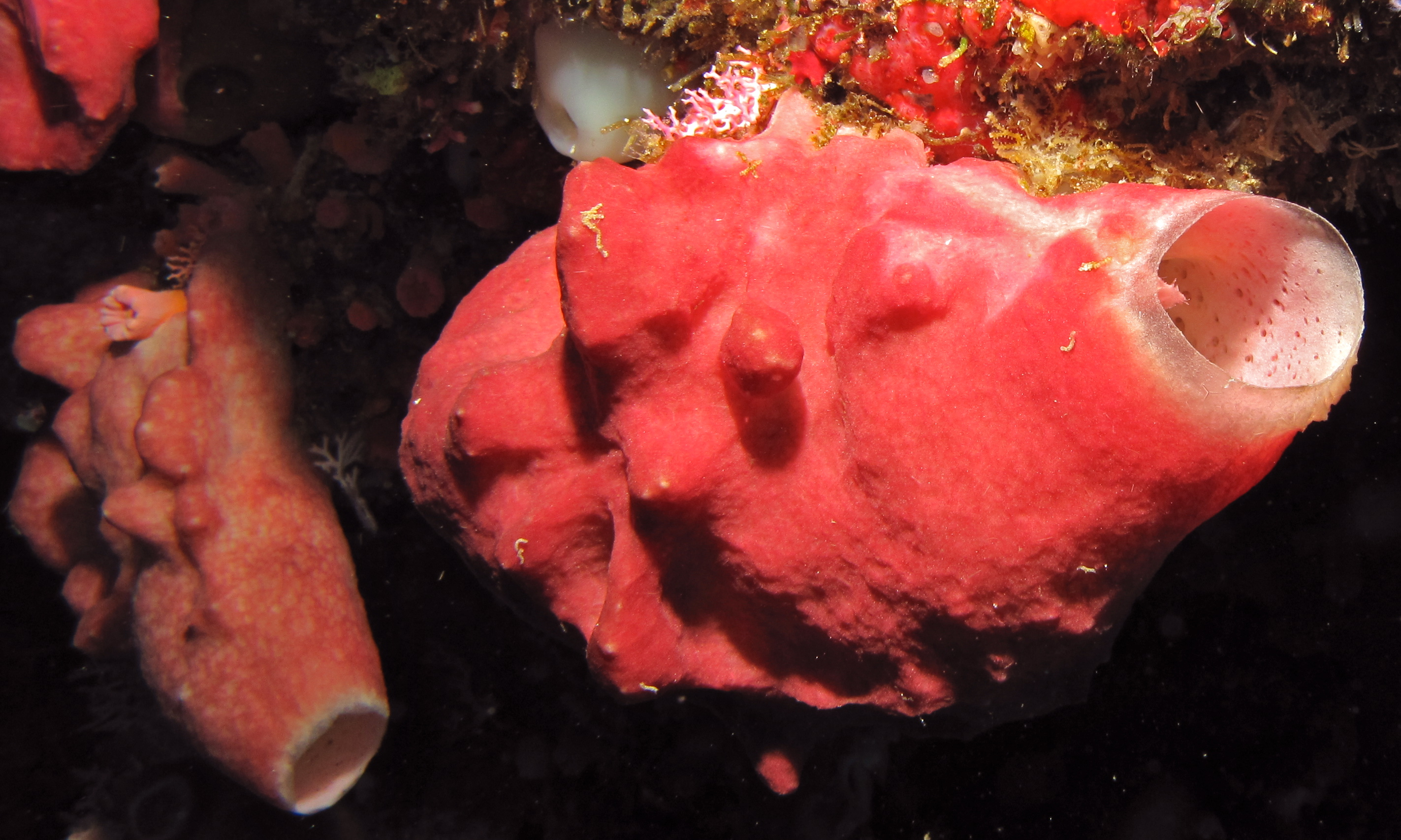

Scientific classification
- Domain: Eukaryota
- Kingdom: Animalia
- Phylum: Porifera
- Class: Calcarea
- Order: Clathrinida
- Family: Leucettidae
- Genus: Leucetta
- Species: L. primigenia

Binomial name
- Leucetta primigenia Haeckel 1872

Synonyms
- Leucandra primigenia (Haeckel, 1872); Leucetta isoraphis Haeckel, 1872; Leucetta megaraphis Haeckel, 1872; Leuconia primigenia (Haeckel, 1872); Lipostomella clausa Haeckel, 1870; Sycothamnus fruticosus Haeckel, 1870

= Leucetta primigenia =

Species of sponge

Leucetta primigenia (common names - ferruginous sponge, Rostroter Kalkschwamm) is a species of calcareous sponge in the family Leucettidae, and was first described in 1872 by Ernst Haeckel.

== Distribution ==
The type locality is in the western Mediterranean. In Australia it is found in New South Wales coastal waters, at depths of 3-385 m.
