= Max Walker de Laubenfels =

- Born: 1894
- Died: February 4, 1958 (aged 63)
- Education: Oberlin College; Stanford University
- Employers: University of Hawaii; Oregon State College
- Awards: Fulbright

Max Walker de Laubenfels (1894–1958) was an American spongiologist. He received his undergraduate degree from Oberlin College in 1916 and his master's and doctorate degrees from Stanford University in 1926 and 1929, respectively.

He was among the most prolific identifiers of new species of Caribbean sponges, describing 60 species from 1932 to 1954. He also authored a complete taxonomic revision of all genera of fossil sponges published in the Treatise on Invertebrate Paleontology.

He was a professor of zoology at Oregon State College from 1950 to 1958 and had previously worked at the University of Hawaii.

In 1956 he published one of the first accounts suggesting that the K-Pg Extinction Event might have been due to an asteroid strike.

== Publications ==
- De Laubenfels, M. W., 1929 : The sponges of California. Dept. of Zoology. 634 pg.
- De Laubenfels, M. W., 1954 : The sponges of the west-central Pacific. Studies in zoology, no.7: 320pg.
- De Laubenfels, M. W., 1955 : Porifera. In: Moore, R. C. (ed.), Treatise on Invertebrate Paleontology, Part E, Archaeocyatha and Porifera, pp. 21–112.

== See also ==
- David John de Laubenfels
