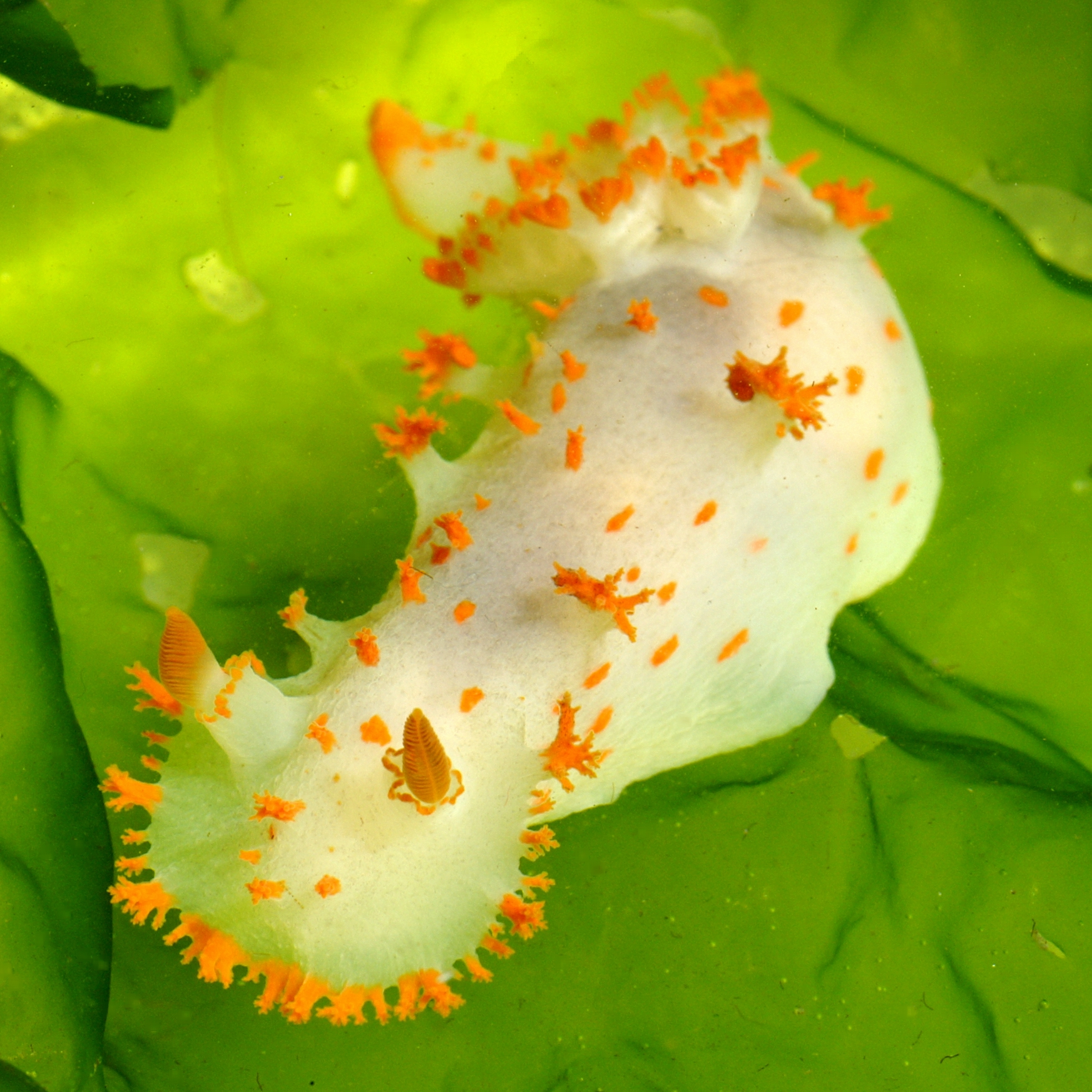
- A live individual of Triopha modesta in situ, head end towards the lower left

Scientific classification
- Kingdom: Animalia
- Phylum: Mollusca
- Class: Gastropoda
- Order: Nudibranchia
- Infraorder: Doridoidei
- Superfamily: Polyceroidea; Alder & Hancock, 1845

Families
- See text.

Synonyms
- Phanerobranchiata Non Suctoria

= Polyceroidea =

Superfamily of gastropods

Polyceroidea is a taxonomic superfamily of sea slugs, specifically dorid nudibranchs, marine gastropod mollusks in the clade Doridacea.

== Families ==
Families within the superfamily Polyceroidea include:

- Family Aegiridae - In Bouchet & Rocroi (2005) this taxon is incorrectly spelled Aegiretidae.
- Family Hexabranchidae
- Family Okadaiidae
- Family Polyceridae
