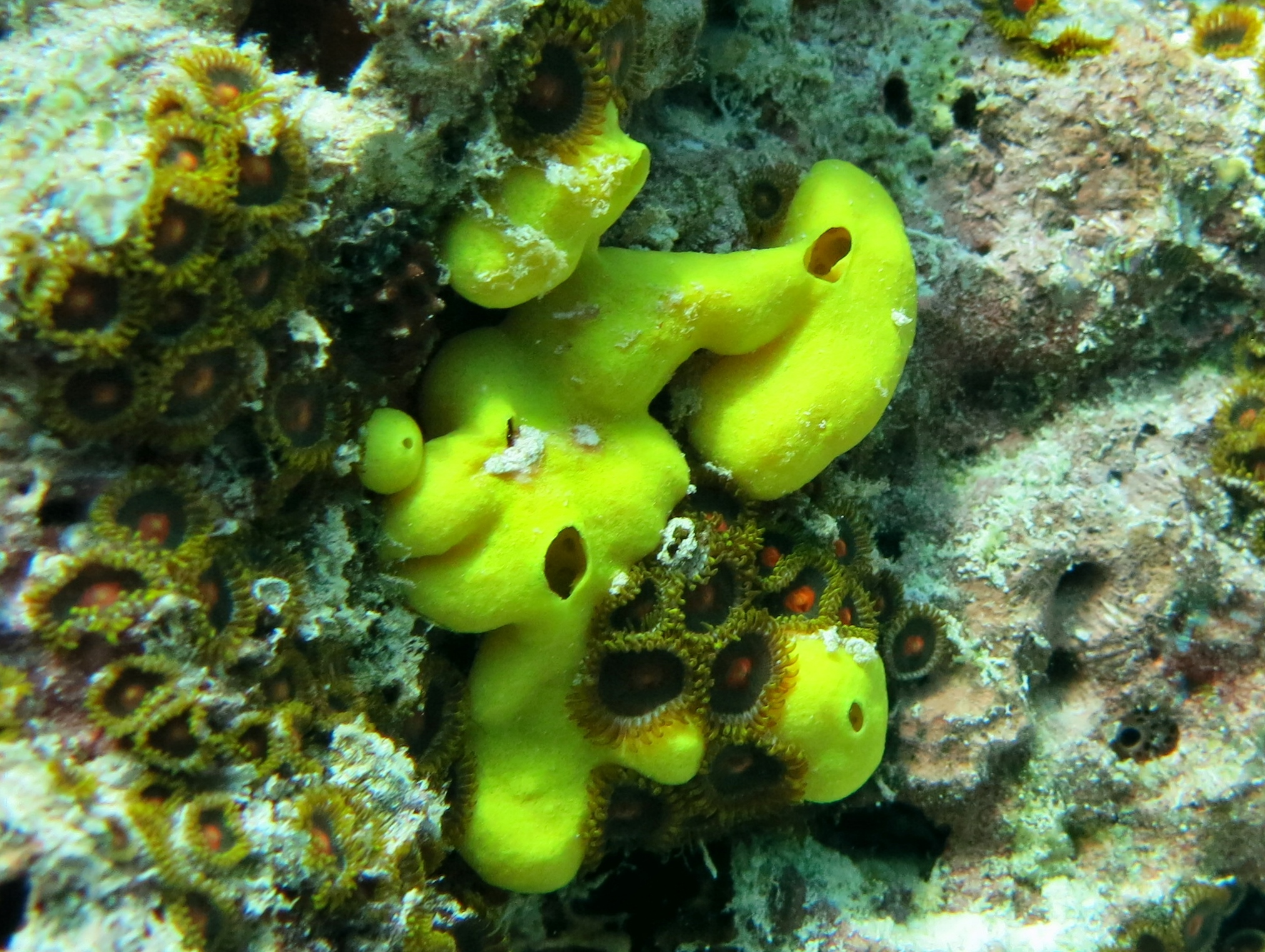
- Leucetta chagosensis
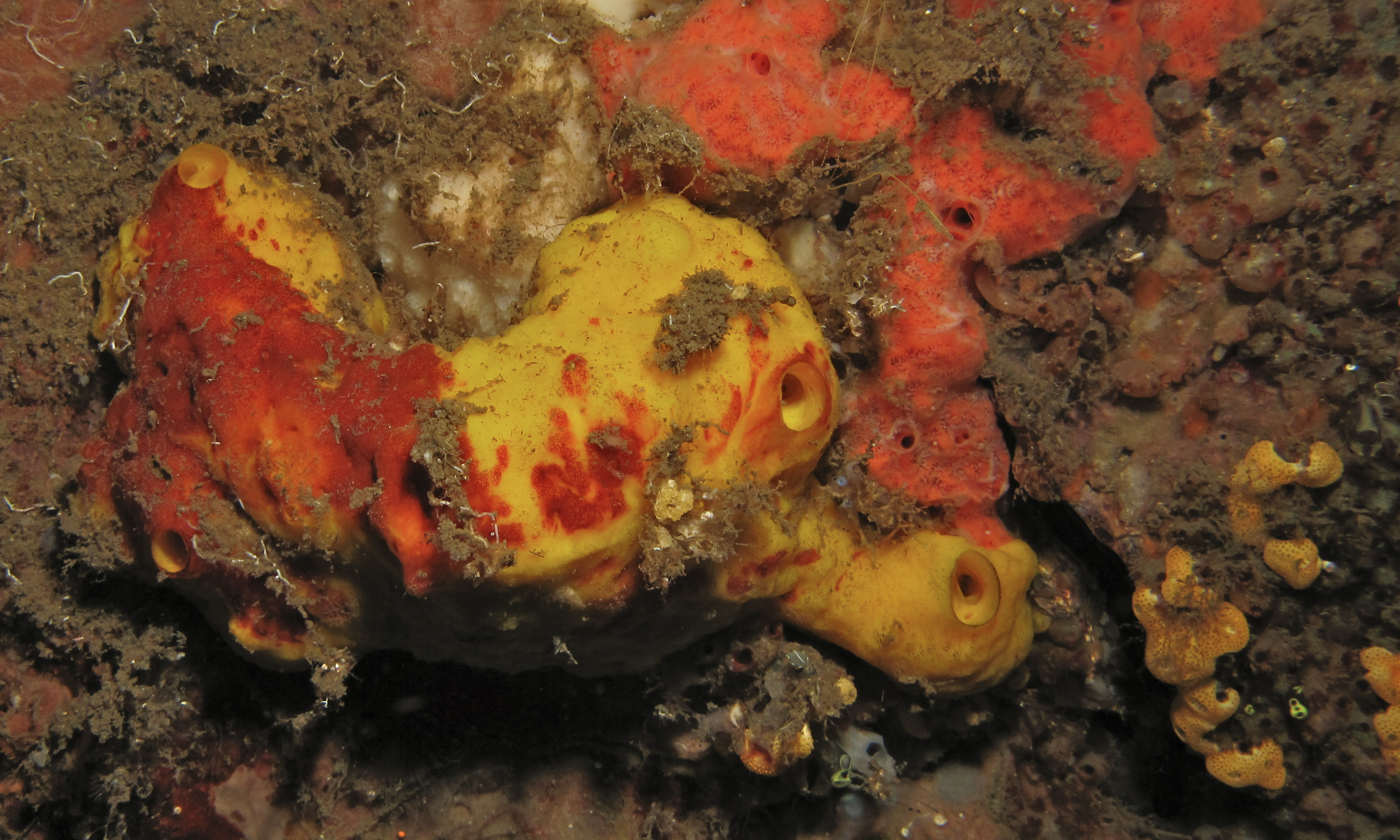
- unidentified Leucettidae (Indonesia)

Scientific classification
- Kingdom: Animalia
- Phylum: Porifera
- Class: Calcarea
- Order: Clathrinida
- Family: Leucettidae; Laubenfels, 1936

= Leucettidae =

Family of sponges

Leucettidae is a family of sea sponges in the subclass Calcinea, first described by Max Walker de Laubenfels in 1936.

== Genera ==
Leucettidae contains the following genera:

- Leucetta
- Pericharax
- Rowella
