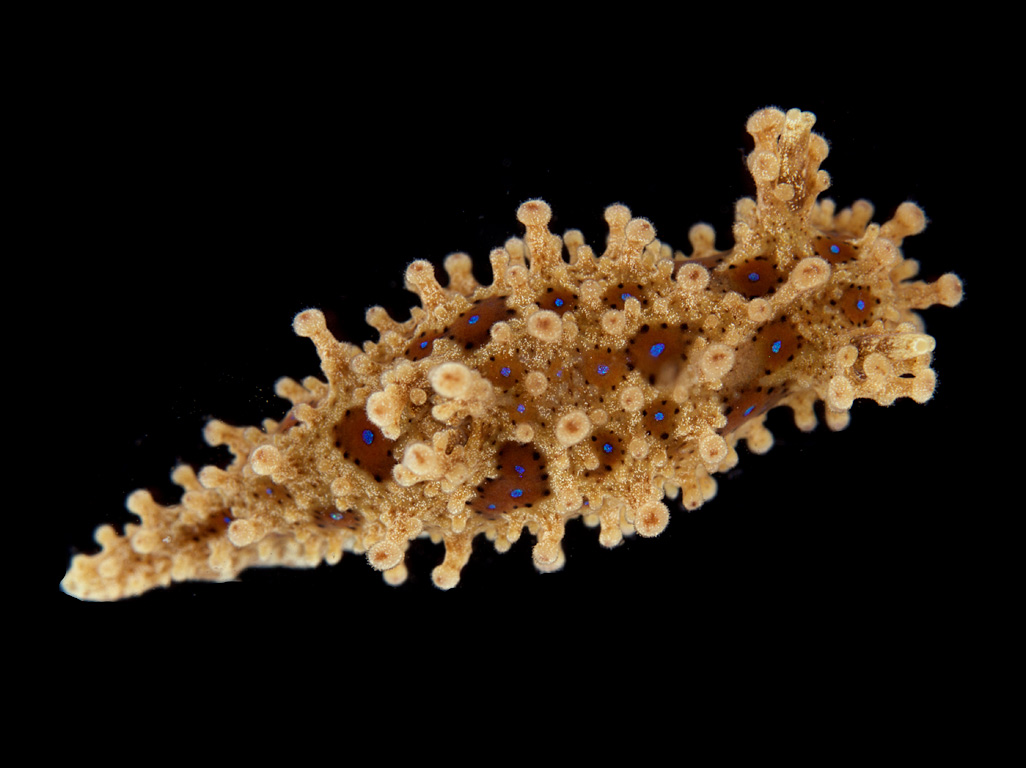
- Aegires punctilucens, type species of the genus Aegires.

Scientific classification
- Kingdom: Animalia
- Phylum: Mollusca
- Class: Gastropoda
- Order: Nudibranchia
- Superfamily: Polyceroidea
- Family: Aegiridae; P. Fischer, 1883

Genera
- See text

Synonyms
- Aegiretidae P. Fischer, 1883 (incorrect subsequent spelling); Notodorididae Thiele, 1931

= Aegiridae =

Family of gastropods

Aegiridae is a taxonomic family of sea slugs, dorid nudibranchs, gastropod molluscs in the superfamily Polyceroidea.

This family has no subfamilies.

== Genera ==
Genera in the family Aegiridae include:

- Genus Aegires Lovén, 1844 - the type genus of the family Aegiridae
- Genus Notodoris Bergh, 1875

Genera brought into synonymy

- Aegirus Agassiz, 1846: synonym of Aegires Lovén, 1844
- Anaegires Odhner, 1934: synonym of Aegires Lovén, 1844
- Serigea F. Nordsieck, 1972: synonym of Aegires Lovén, 1844
- Triopella G.O. Sars, 1878: synonym of Aegires Lovén, 1844
