= Soleneiscus apicalis =

Scientific classification
- Kingdom: Animalia
- Phylum: Porifera
- Class: Calcarea
- Order: Clathrinida
- Family: Dendyidae
- Genus: Soleneiscus
- Species: S. apicalis

Binomial name
- Soleneiscus apicalis (Brøndsted, 1931)

Synonyms
- Leucetta isoraphis var. apicalis Brøndsted, 1931; Leucosolenia apicalis (Brøndsted, 1931)

Species of sponge

Soleneiscus apicalis is a species of calcareous sponge in the family Dendyidae.

The sponge was first described in 1931 by Holger Valdemar Brøndsted as Leucetta isoraphis var. apicalis.
