= Neoernsta laxa =

Scientific classification
- Kingdom: Animalia
- Phylum: Porifera
- Class: Calcarea
- Order: Clathrinida
- Family: Dendyidae
- Genus: Neoernsta
- Species: N. laxa

Binomial name
- Neoernsta laxa (Kirk, 1896)

Synonyms
- List: Clathrina laxa (Kirk, 1896); Ernsta laxa (Kirk, 1896); Ernstia laxa (Kirk, 1896); Leucosolenia laxa Kirk, 1896

Species of sponge

Neoernsta laxa is a species of calcareous sponge in the family Dendyidae found in New Zealand. The species name is derived from Latin meaning "wide".

== Description ==
This species is similar to Ascaltis reticulum except it has wider and has thicker actines. More research is needed to confirm the correct classification of this organism.
