= Ascandra corallicola =

Scientific classification
- Kingdom: Animalia
- Phylum: Porifera
- Class: Calcarea
- Order: Clathrinida
- Family: Dendyidae
- Genus: Ascandra
- Species: A. corallicola

Binomial name
- Ascandra corallicola (Rapp, 2006)

Synonyms
- Clathrina corallicola Rapp, 2006

Species of sponge

Ascandra corallicola is a species of calcareous sponge in the family Leucaltidae. It is known from the coastal waters in northeast Atlantic at depths between 90 and 530 m (300 and 1,740 ft), and on the Reykjanes Ridge as deep as 1,300 m (4,300 ft). It occurs solely on dead parts of the corals Lophelia pertusa and Solenosmilia variabilis, to which its specific name corallicola refers to.
