= Soleneiscus radovani =

Scientific classification
- Kingdom: Animalia
- Phylum: Porifera
- Class: Calcarea
- Order: Clathrinida
- Family: Dendyidae
- Genus: Soleneiscus
- Species: S. radovani

Binomial name
- Soleneiscus radovani Wörheide & Hooper, 1999

Species of sponge

Holotype site (south side of Wistari Reef)'"`UNIQ--ref-00000007-QINU`"'

Soleneiscus radovani is a species of calcareous sponge in the family Dendyidae, and was first described in 1999 by Gert Wörheide and John Hooper. The species epithet, radovani, honours Radovan Borojevic for "his substantial and pioneering achievements in calcarean taxonomy".

It is found in Queensland coastal waters, where it occurs in waters with surface temperatures of 20 to 30 °C.
