= Neoernsta quadriradiata =

Scientific classification
- Kingdom: Animalia
- Phylum: Porifera
- Class: Calcarea
- Order: Clathrinida
- Family: Dendyidae
- Genus: Neoernsta
- Species: N. quadriradiata

Binomial name
- Neoernsta quadriradiata (Klautau & Borojevic, 2001)

Synonyms
- Clathrina quadriradiata Klautau & Borojevic, 2001; Ernsta quadriradiata (Klautau & Borojević, 2001); Ernstia quadriradiata (Klautau & Borojević, 2001)

Species of sponge

Neoernsta quadriradiata is a species of calcareous sponge in the family Dendyidae from Brazil.
