= Ascaltis pelliculata =

Scientific classification
- Domain: Eukaryota
- Kingdom: Animalia
- Phylum: Porifera
- Class: Calcarea
- Order: Clathrinida
- Family: Leucascidae
- Genus: Ascaltis
- Species: A. pelliculata

Binomial name
- Ascaltis pelliculata (Dendy, 1891)

Synonyms
- Clathrina pelliculata (Dendy, 1891); Leucosolenia pelliculata Dendy, 1891

Species of sponge

Syntype site (inside Port Phillip Heads)'"`UNIQ--ref-00000005-QINU`"'

Ascaltis pelliculata is a species of sea sponge in the family Leucascidae, first described as Leucoselenia pelliculata by Arthur Dendy in 1891. it is found in the coastal waters of Victoria.
