= Ascandra atlantica =

Scientific classification
- Domain: Eukaryota
- Kingdom: Animalia
- Phylum: Porifera
- Class: Calcarea
- Order: Clathrinida
- Family: Leucaltidae
- Genus: Ascandra
- Species: A. atlantica

Binomial name
- Ascandra atlantica (Thacker, 1908)

Synonyms
- Leucosolenia atlantica Thacker, 1908; Clathrina atlantica (Thacker, 1908)

Species of sponge

Ascandra atlantica is a species of calcareous sponge from Cape Verde.
