= Neoernsta sagamiana =

Scientific classification
- Kingdom: Animalia
- Phylum: Porifera
- Class: Calcarea
- Order: Clathrinida
- Family: Dendyidae
- Genus: Neoernsta
- Species: N. sagamiana

Binomial name
- Neoernsta sagamiana (Hôzawa, 1929)

Synonyms
- Clathrina sagamiana (Hôzawa, 1929); Ernsta sagamiana (Hôzawa, 1929); Ernstia sagamiana (Hôzawa, 1929); Leucosolenia sagamiana Hôzawa, 1929

Species of sponge

Neoernsta sagamiana is a species of calcareous sponge from Japan.
