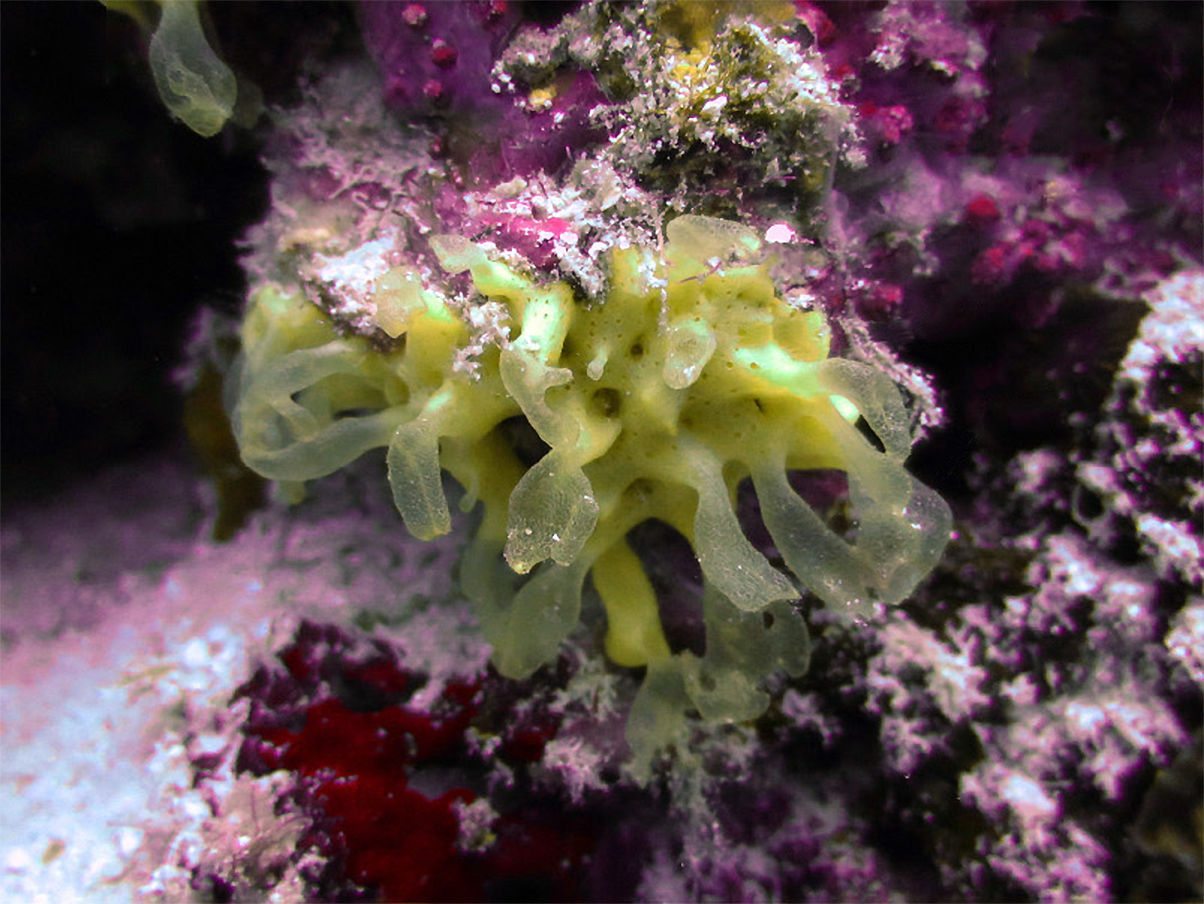

Scientific classification
- Kingdom: Animalia
- Phylum: Porifera
- Class: Calcarea
- Order: Clathrinida
- Family: Dendyidae
- Genus: Leuclathrina
- Species: L. translucida

Binomial name
- Leuclathrina translucida Voigt et al., 2018

= Leuclathrina translucida =

Species of sponge

Leuclathrina translucida is a species of calcareous sponge in the family Dendyidae from the Maldives.
