= Ascandra densa =

Scientific classification
- Kingdom: Animalia
- Phylum: Porifera
- Class: Calcarea
- Order: Clathrinida
- Family: Dendyidae
- Genus: Ascandra
- Species: A. densa

Binomial name
- Ascandra densa (Haeckel, 1872)

Synonyms
- Clathrina densa Haeckel, 1872; Leucosolenia densa (Haeckel, 1872); Tarrus densa (Haeckel, 1872)

Species of sponge

Ascandra densa is a species of calcareous sponge from Australia. The species name is derived from a Latin term meaning "dense" or "compact".
