= Dendya clathrata =

Scientific classification
- Kingdom: Animalia
- Phylum: Porifera
- Class: Calcarea
- Order: Clathrinida
- Family: Dendyidae
- Genus: Dendya
- Species: D. clathrata

Binomial name
- Dendya clathrata (Carter, 1883)

Synonyms
- List: Ascetta challengeri (Poléjaeff, 1883); Clathrina challengeri (Poléjaeff, 1883); Clathrina clathrata (Carter, 1883); Clathrina intermedia (Kirk, 1896); Grantia cliftoni Bowerbank in Dendy & Row, 1913; Leucetta clathrata Carter, 1883; Leucosolenia challengeri Poléjaeff, 1883; Leucosolenia intermedia Kirk, 1896

Species of sponge

Dendya clathrata is a species of calcareous sponge in the family Dendyidae.
