= Ascaltis grisea =

Scientific classification
- Domain: Eukaryota
- Kingdom: Animalia
- Phylum: Porifera
- Class: Calcarea
- Order: Clathrinida
- Family: Leucascidae
- Genus: Ascaltis
- Species: A. grisea

Binomial name
- Ascaltis grisea (Dendy & Frederick, 1924)

Synonyms
- Clathrina grisea (Dendy & Frederick, 1924); Leucetta grisea (Dendy & Frederick, 1924); Leucosolenia grisea Dendy & Frederick, 1924

Species of sponge

Holotype site'"`UNIQ--ref-00000005-QINU`"'

Ascaltis grisea is a species of sea sponge in the family Leucascidae, first described as Leucosolenia grisea by Arthur Dendy in 1891. It is known only from its type locality on the Houtman Albrolhos archipelago in Western Australia. It is a marine sessile filter-feeder.
