= Ascandra izuensis =

Scientific classification
- Kingdom: Animalia
- Phylum: Porifera
- Class: Calcarea
- Order: Clathrinida
- Family: Dendyidae
- Genus: Ascandra
- Species: A. izuensis

Binomial name
- Ascandra izuensis (Tanita, 1942)

Synonyms
- List: Clathrina izuensis (Tanita, 1942); Leucosolenia izuensis Tanita, 1942

Species of sponge

Ascandra izuensis is a species of sea sponge in the family Clathrinidae. The species is named after the Izu Peninsula where the holotype was collected.

== Description ==
Ascandra izuensis is a calcareous sponge. It is found in the Central Kuroshio Current, Japan. The sponge consists of loosely branched and anastomosing ascon-tubes directly attached to a substratum. There is no pseudoderm covering the whole colony and no endogastric network. The sponge is rather small and attains a length of about 6 mm. The diameter of the ascon-tubes varies from 0.3 mm to 1 mm and the dermal surface of the tubes have a hispid appearance on account of projecting oxea. The colour of the sponge is yellowish-white when preserved in alcohol. The skeleton of the sponge is composed of triradiates, large and small quadriradiates, and oxea. The tri- and quadriradiates are arranged in a few layers in the sponge wall. The quadriradiates are more numerous than the triradiates and their apical rays project into the gastral cavity. The larger quadriradiates are usually arranged in the dermal skeleton. The oxea occur vertically or obliquely to the surface of the ascon-tubes.
