= Ascaltis =

Scientific classification
- Domain: Eukaryota
- Kingdom: Animalia
- Phylum: Porifera
- Class: Calcarea
- Order: Clathrinida
- Family: Leucascidae
- Genus: Ascaltis; Haeckel, 1872

Species
- See text

Genus of sponges

Ascaltis is a genus of sponges in the family Leucascidae, first described in 1872 by Ernst Haeckel.

== Species ==
According to WORMS, accepted species in the genus are:

- Ascaltis abyssus Rapp, Janussen & Tendal, 2011
- Ascaltis agassizii Haeckel, 1872
- Ascaltis cavata (Carter, 1886)
- Ascaltis depressa (Dendy, 1891)
- Ascaltis gardineri (Dendy, 1913)
- Ascaltis grisea (Dendy & Frederick, 1924)
- Ascaltis lamarcki (Haeckel, 1870)
- Ascaltis panis (Haeckel, 1870)
- Ascaltis pelliculata (Dendy, 1891)
- Ascaltis poterium (Haeckel, 1872)
- Ascaltis reticulum (Schmidt, 1862)
- Ascaltis vitraea (Row & Hôzawa, 1931)
- Ascaltis wilsoni (Dendy, 1891)
