= Neoernsta minoricensis =

Scientific classification
- Kingdom: Animalia
- Phylum: Porifera
- Class: Calcarea
- Order: Clathrinida
- Family: Dendyidae
- Genus: Neoernsta
- Species: N. minoricensis

Binomial name
- Neoernsta minoricensis (Lackschewitsch, 1896)

Synonyms
- List: Clathrina minoricensis (Lackschewitz, 1886); Ernsta minoricensis (Lackschewitz, 1886); Ernstia minoricensis (Lackschewitz, 1886); Leucosolenia minorcensis; Leucosolenia minoricensis Lackschewitsch, 1896

Species of sponge

Neoernsta minoricensis is a species of calcareous sponge in the family Dendyidae found in Spain. The species is named after the island of Menorca, where the type specimen was discovered.

== Description ==
Triactines and tetractines are regular (equiangular and equiradiate) and are the same size. The actines are 7–10 times longer than they are thick, with slender tapers. The apical actines of the tetractines are straight and 3–4 times thinner than the triactines.
