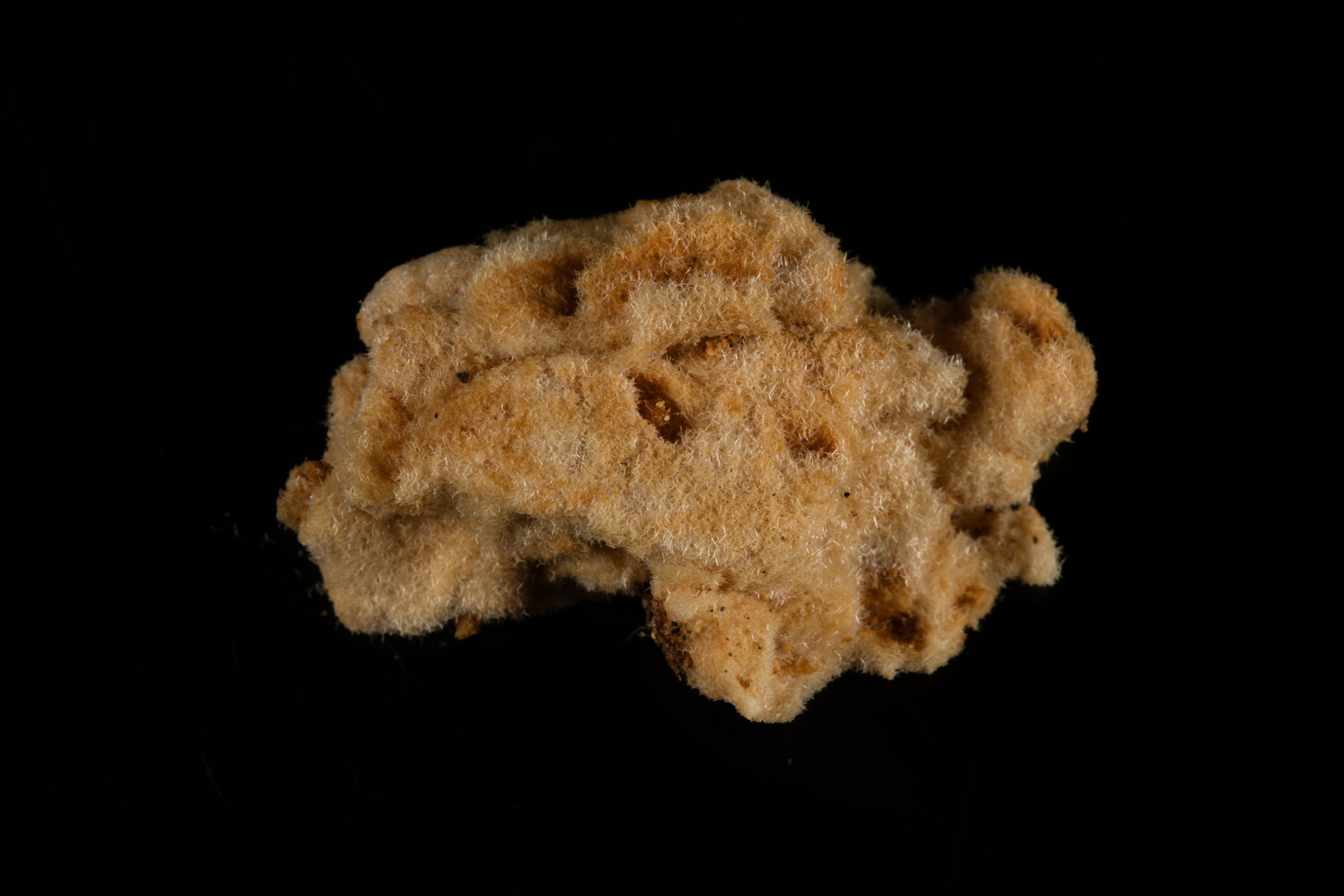
- (AM MA36104-1)

Scientific classification
- Domain: Eukaryota
- Kingdom: Animalia
- Phylum: Porifera
- Class: Calcarea
- Order: Clathrinida
- Family: Leucaltidae
- Genus: Leucettusa
- Species: L. tubulosa

Binomial name
- Leucettusa tubulosa Dendy, 1924

Synonyms
- Leucetta lancifera (Dendy, 1924)

= Leucettusa tubulosa =

Species of sponge

Leucettusa tubulosa is a species of calcareous sponge in the family Leucaltidae first described by Arthur Dendy in 1924, and found in New Zealand waters, (with the type specimen found off the Three Kings).

== Description ==
Leucettusa tubulosa is a fused, tubular sponge, typically made up of a series of individuals sharing a common base. The slightly bulbous individuals are 8 mm in diameter, and up to 4 cm high. The texture of the sponge is brittle and without elasticity. It grows singly or in clusters, on rocky surfaces, ranging up to 85 m in depth. It is found off both the North and South Islands of New Zealand.
