= Ascandra ascandroides =

Scientific classification
- Kingdom: Animalia
- Phylum: Porifera
- Class: Calcarea
- Order: Clathrinida
- Family: Dendyidae
- Genus: Ascandra
- Species: A. ascandroides

Binomial name
- Ascandra ascandroides (Borojevic, 1971)

Synonyms
- Clathrina ascandroides

Species of sponge

Ascandra ascandroides is a species of calcareous sponge from Brazil.
