= Ascandra biscayae =

Scientific classification
- Kingdom: Animalia
- Phylum: Porifera
- Class: Calcarea
- Order: Clathrinida
- Family: Dendyidae
- Genus: Ascandra
- Species: A. biscayae

Binomial name
- Ascandra biscayae (Borejevic and Boury-Esnault, 1987)

Synonyms
- Clathrina biscayae

Species of sponge

Ascandra biscayae is a species of calcareous sponge from the Bay of Biscay.
