= Leucettusa soyo =

Scientific classification
- Domain: Eukaryota
- Kingdom: Animalia
- Phylum: Porifera
- Class: Calcarea
- Order: Clathrinida
- Family: Leucaltidae
- Genus: Leucettusa
- Species: L. soyo

Binomial name
- Leucettusa soyo (Hôzawa, 1933)

Synonyms
- List: Ascoleucetta soyo (Hôzawa, 1933); Clathrina soyo (Hôzawa, 1933); Leucosolenia soyo Hôzawa, 1933

Species of sponge

Leucettusa soyo is a species of calcareous sponge in the family Leucaltidae found in Japan.
