= Soleneiscus hispidus =

Scientific classification
- Kingdom: Animalia
- Phylum: Porifera
- Class: Calcarea
- Order: Clathrinida
- Family: Dendyidae
- Genus: Soleneiscus
- Species: S. hispidus

Binomial name
- Soleneiscus hispidus (Brøndsted, 1931)

Synonyms
- Leucosolenia hispida Brøndsted, 1931

Species of sponge

Soleneiscus hispidus is a species of calcareous sponge in the family Dendyidae.

The sponge was first described in 1931 by Holger Valdemar Brøndsted as Leucosolenia hispida.

According to the Australian Faunal Directory it is known only from the Australian Antarctic Territories, where it has been found at a depth of 350–385 m on the Wilhelm II Coast.
