= Ascaltis panis =

Scientific classification
- Domain: Eukaryota
- Kingdom: Animalia
- Phylum: Porifera
- Class: Calcarea
- Order: Clathrinida
- Family: Leucascidae
- Genus: Ascaltis
- Species: A. panis

Binomial name
- Ascaltis panis (Haeckel, 1870)

Synonyms
- Ascandra panis Haeckel, 1870; Clathrina panis (Haeckel, 1870); Leucosolenia panis (Haeckel, 1870)

Species of sponge

Ascaltis panis is a species of calcareous sponge in the family Leucascidae found in the Caribbean Sea.
