= Neoernsta cordata =

Scientific classification
- Kingdom: Animalia
- Phylum: Porifera
- Class: Calcarea
- Order: Clathrinida
- Family: Dendyidae
- Genus: Neoernsta
- Species: N. cordata

Binomial name
- Neoernsta cordata (Haeckel, 1872)

Synonyms
- Ascandra cordata Haeckel, 1872; Clathrina cordata (Haeckel, 1872); Ernsta cordata (Haeckel, 1872); Ernstia cordata (Haeckel, 1872); Leucosolenia cordata (Haeckel, 1872)

Species of sponge

Neoernsta cordata is a species of sea sponge in the family Dendyidae found in South Africa. The species epithet means "heart-shaped" in Latin.
