= Leucettusa lancifera =

Scientific classification
- Domain: Eukaryota
- Kingdom: Animalia
- Phylum: Porifera
- Class: Calcarea
- Order: Clathrinida
- Family: Leucaltidae
- Genus: Leucettusa
- Species: L. lancifera

Binomial name
- Leucettusa lancifera Dendy, 1924

Synonyms
- Leucetta lancifera (Dendy, 1924)

Species of sponge

Leucettusa lancifera is a species of calcareous sponge in the family Leucaltidae first described by Arthur Dendy in 1924, and found in New Zealand waters, (with the type specimen found off the Three Kings).

== Description ==
Leucettusa lancifera is a white to cream, flask-shaped sponge, which is 2–3 cm in diameter, and up to 8 cm high. The texture of the sponge is brittle and without elasticity. It grows singly or in clusters, on rocky surfaces, ranging up to 50 m in depth. Its surface is smooth and glistening. It is found off both the North and South Islands of New Zealand.
