= Neoernsta septentrionalis =

Scientific classification
- Kingdom: Animalia
- Phylum: Porifera
- Class: Calcarea
- Order: Clathrinida
- Family: Dendyidae
- Genus: Neoernsta
- Species: N. septentrionalis

Binomial name
- Neoernsta septentrionalis (Rapp, Klautau & Valentine, 2001)

Synonyms
- Clathrina septentrionalis Rapp, Klautau & Valentine, 2001; Ernsta septentrionalis (Rapp, Klautau & Valentine, 2001); Ernstia septentrionalis (Rapp, Klautau & Valentine, 2001)

Species of sponge

Neoernsta septentrionalis is a species of calcareous sponge from Norway.
