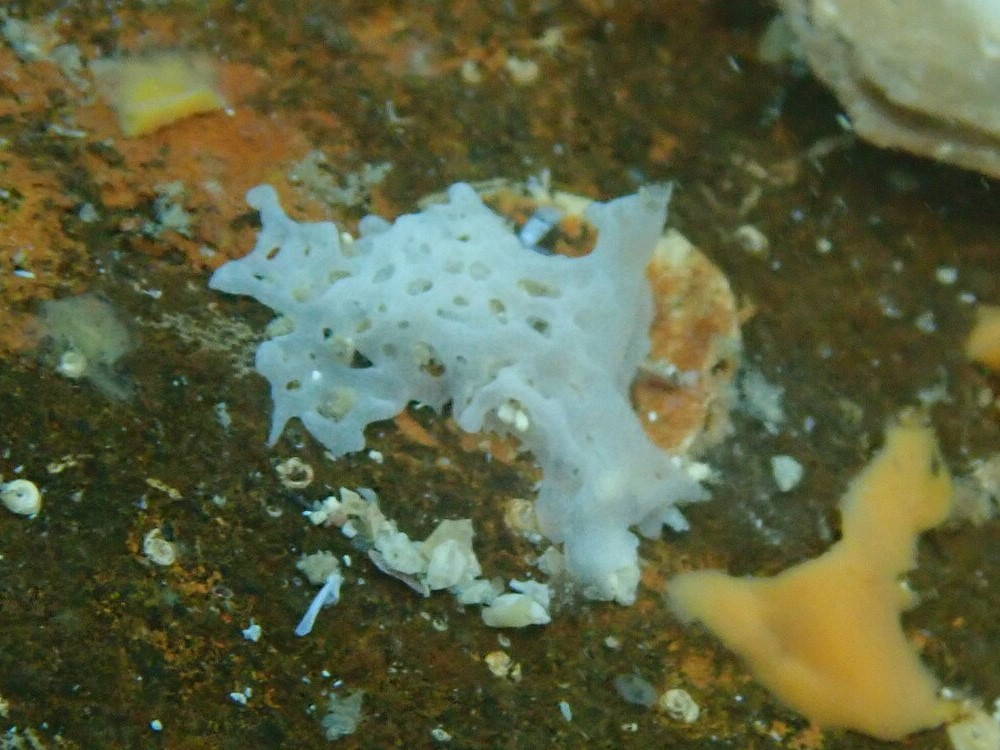

Scientific classification
- Kingdom: Animalia
- Phylum: Porifera
- Class: Calcarea
- Order: Clathrinida
- Family: Dendyidae
- Genus: Neoernsta
- Species: N. tetractina

Binomial name
- Neoernsta tetractina (Klautau & Borojevic, 2001)

Synonyms
- Clathrina tetractina Klautau & Borojevic, 2001; Ernsta tetractina (Klautau & Borojević, 2001); Ernstia tetractina (Klautau & Borojević, 2001)

= Neoernsta tetractina =

Species of sponge

Neoernsta tetractina is a species of calcareous sponge in the family Dendyidae that is found off the coast of Arraial do Cabo, Brazil.
