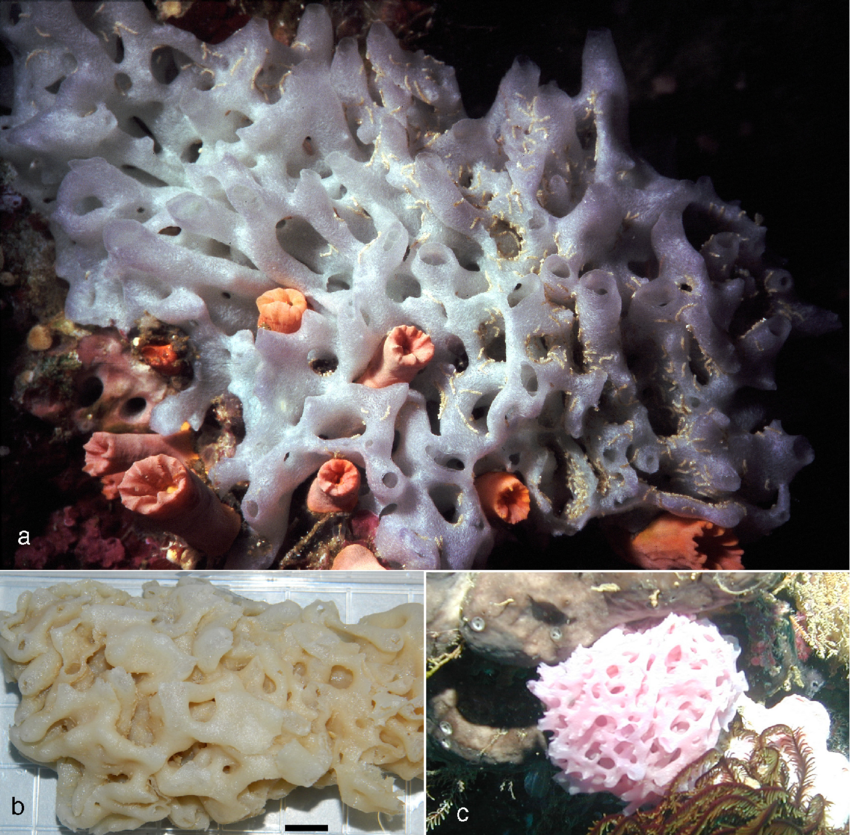

Scientific classification
- Domain: Eukaryota
- Kingdom: Animalia
- Phylum: Porifera
- Class: Calcarea
- Order: Clathrinida
- Family: Leucaltidae
- Genus: Leucaltis
- Species: L. nodusgordii

Binomial name
- Leucaltis nodusgordii Poléjaeff, 1883

Synonyms
- Heteropegma nodusgordii Poléjaeff, 1883; Leucaltis bathybia var. mascarenica Ridley, 1884

= Leucaltis nodusgordii =

Species of sea sponge

Leucaltis nodusgordii is a species of sea sponge in the genus Leucaltis.
