= Ascaltis gardineri =

Scientific classification
- Kingdom: Animalia
- Phylum: Porifera
- Class: Calcarea
- Order: Clathrinida
- Family: Clathrinidae
- Genus: Clathrina
- Species: C. gardineri

Binomial name
- Clathrina gardineri (Dendy, 1913)

Synonyms
- List: Clathrina gardineri (Dendy, 1913); Leucosolenia gardineri Dendy, 1913

Species of calcareous sponge

Ascaltis gardineri is a species of calcareous sponge in the family Leucascidae from India and the Seychelles. The species is named after the British zoologist John Stanley Gardiner.

== Description ==
Formed of regularly and tightly anastomosed, very thin, delicate tubes. In shape it is lobose, and full of folds. Each fold is flat, thin and delicate. Oscula have not been observed. In the centre of each fold there is a large tube (pseudoatrium), with choanocytes, surrounded by thinner tubes. Covering the external tubes, there are some large triactines. The wall of the tubes is very thin. The tubes are perpendicular to the surface, and converge at a large central tube. Above the central tube, it is possible to see some lacunes. The skeleton is formed of two types of triactines, of different sizes, and tetractines of the same size as the shorter triactines. The spicules are equiradiate and equiangular. Actines are conical with sharp tips. The large triactines are present only in the outside of the external tubes, where they lie side by side. The other triactines are spread along the tubes. Tetractines are less abundant than triactines. Their apical actine is almost the same thickness as the other actines. It is conical, sharp, shorter, straight and smooth and projected inside the tubes.
