= Dendya =

Scientific classification
- Kingdom: Animalia
- Phylum: Porifera
- Class: Calcarea
- Order: Clathrinida
- Family: Dendyidae
- Genus: Dendya; Bidder, 1898

Species
- See text

Genus of sponges

Dendya is a genus of calcareous sponges in the family Dendyidae.

== Species ==
- Dendya clathrata (Carter, 1883)
- Dendya quadripodifera Hozawa, 1929
- Dendya tripodifera (Carter, 1886)
- Dendya triradiata Tanita, 1943
