= Bidderia =

Scientific classification
- Kingdom: Animalia
- Phylum: Porifera
- Class: Calcarea
- Order: Clathrinida
- Family: Leucascidae
- Genus: Bidderia; Lopes, Cóndor-Luján, Azevedo, Pérez & Klautau, 2018

Species
- See text

Genus of sponges

Bidderia is a genus of sponges in the family Leucascidae, first described in 2018 by Lopes, Cóndor-Luján, Azevedo, Pérez & Klautau.

== Species ==
The genus contains three species:

- Bidderia amitsba (Hôzawa, 1929)
- Bidderia bicolora (Lopes, Cóndor-Luján, Azevedo, Pérez & Klautau, 2018)
- Bidderia watremezi (Lopes, Pérez & Klautau, 2024)
