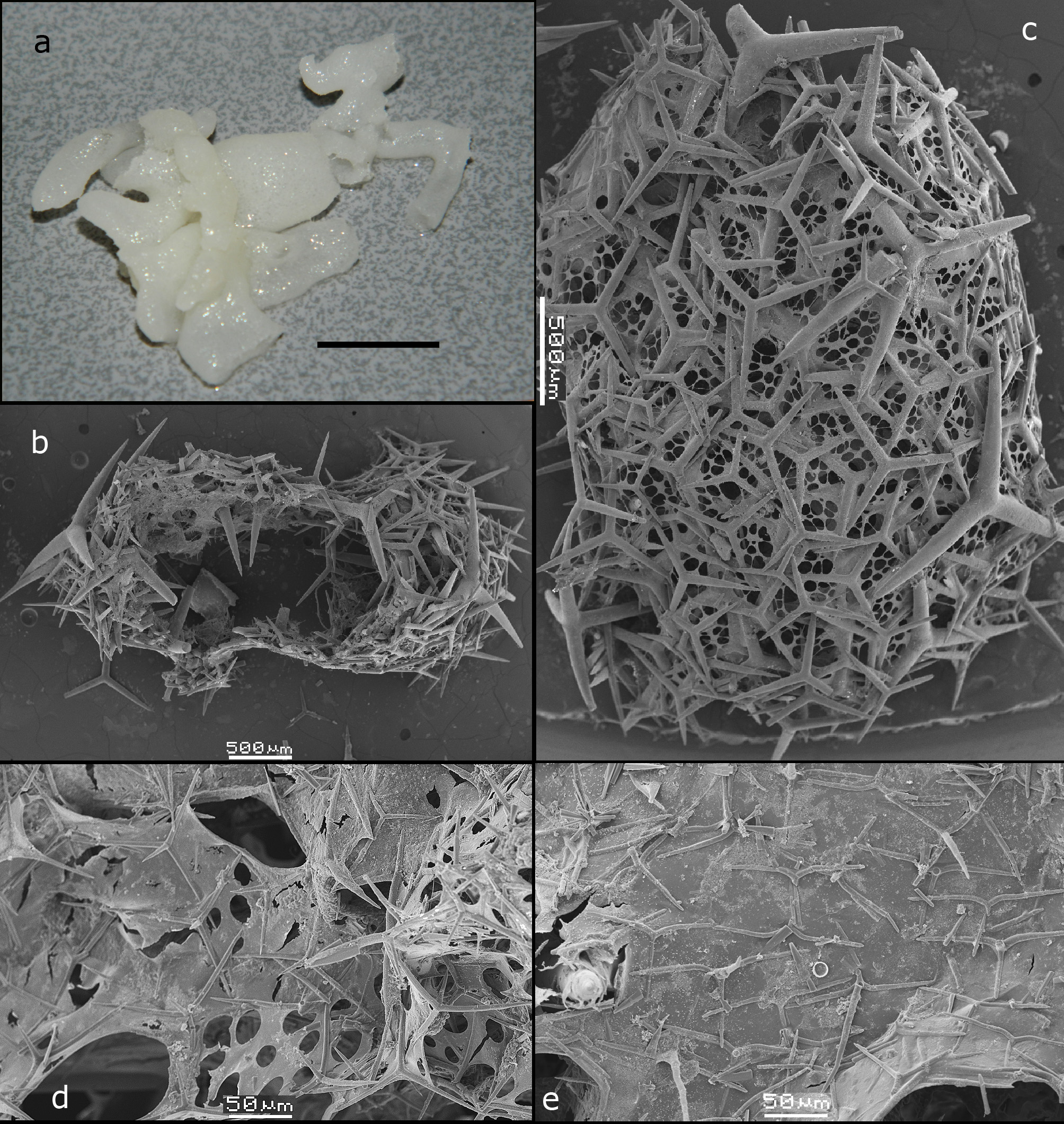

Scientific classification
- Kingdom: Animalia
- Phylum: Porifera
- Class: Calcarea
- Order: Clathrinida
- Family: Leucaltidae
- Genus: Leucaltis; Haeckel, 1872

Synonyms
- Heteropegma Poléjaeff, 1883

= Leucaltis =

Genus of sponges

Leucaltis is a genus of sponges belonging to the family Leucaltidae.

The genus has almost cosmopolitan distribution.

Species:

- Leucaltis clathria Haeckel, 1872
- Leucaltis corticata (Haeckel, 1872)
- Leucaltis latitubulata (Carter, 1886)
- Leucaltis nodusgordii (Poléjaeff, 1883)
- Leucaltis sambucus (Preiwisch, 1904)
- Leucaltis tenuis Hôzawa, 1929
