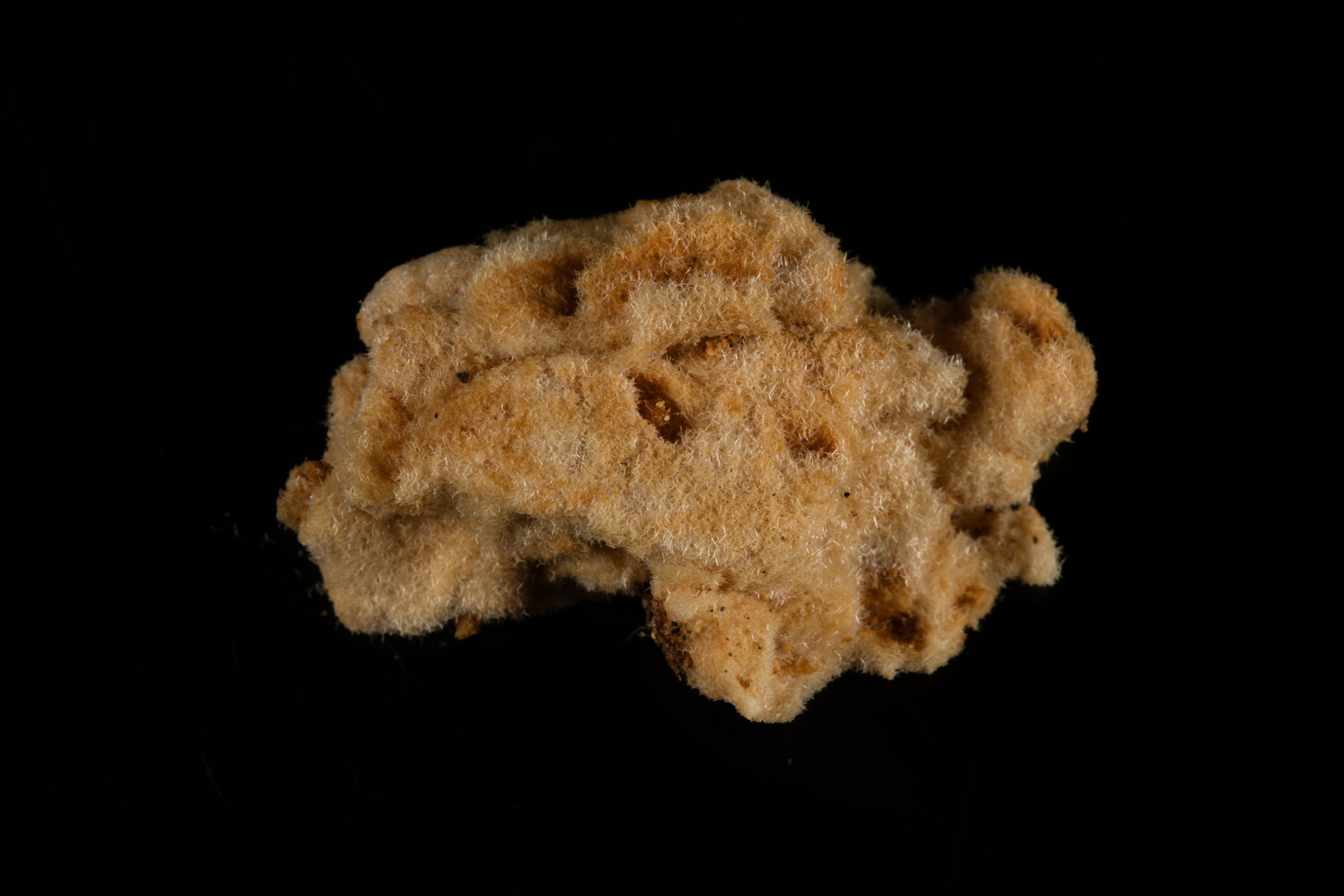
- Leucettusa tubulosa

Scientific classification
- Kingdom: Animalia
- Phylum: Porifera
- Class: Calcarea
- Order: Clathrinida
- Family: Leucaltidae
- Genus: Leucettusa; Haeckel, 1872

Type species
- Leucettusa corticata (Haeckel, 1872)

Species
- See text.

= Leucettusa =

Genus of sponges

Leucettusa is a genus of sponges belonging to the family Leucaltidae. The species of this genus are mostly known from the Arctic and Antarctic, New Zealand and Southwest Australia.

== Description ==
Species have a simple tubular body with a large atrium, and choanocyte chambers which are either elongated, spherical or both.

== Species ==
The following species are recognised:

- Leucettusa clathria
- Leucettusa corticata (Haeckel, 1872)
- Leucettusa dictyogaster Dendy & Row, 1913
- Leucettusa haeckeliana (Polejaeff, 1883)
- Leucettusa imperfecta (Polejaeff, 1883)
- Leucettusa lancifera Dendy, 1924
- Leucettusa mariae Brøndsted, 1927
- Leucettusa nuda (Azevedo, Hajdu, Willenz & Klautau, 2009)
- Leucettusa pyriformis Brøndsted, 1927
- Leucettusa sambucus (Preiwisch, 1904)
- Leucettusa simplicissima Burton, 1932
- Leucettusa soyo (Hôzawa, 1933)
- Leucettusa tubulosa Dendy, 1924
- Leucettusa vera Poléjaeff, 1883
