= Ascandra =

Scientific classification
- Kingdom: Animalia
- Phylum: Porifera
- Class: Calcarea
- Order: Clathrinida
- Family: Dendyidae
- Genus: Ascandra; Haeckel, 1872

Species
- See text

Synonyms
- Homandra Lendenfeld, 1891

Genus of sponges

Ascandra is a genus of calcareous sponges of the family Dendyidae and are found in oceans around the world.

== Species ==
As of 2023, 18 valid species of Ascandra are recognized:

- Ascandra alba Fonseca, Cóndor‑Luján & Cavalcanti, 2023
- Ascandra ascandroides (Borojevic, 1971)
- Ascandra atlantica (Thacker, 1908)
- Ascandra biscayae (Borojevic & Boury-Esnault, 1987)
- Ascandra brandtae (Rapp, Göcke, Tendal & Janussen, 2013)
- Ascandra chrysops (Van Soest & De Voogd, 2015)
- Ascandra contorta (Bowerbank, 1866)
- Ascandra corallicola (Rapp, 2006)
- Ascandra crewsi Van Soest & De Voogd, 2015
- Ascandra densa Haeckel, 1872
- Ascandra falcata Haeckel, 1872
- Ascandra izuensis (Tanita, 1942)
- Ascandra kakaban Van Soest & De Voogd, 2015
- Ascandra mascarenica Klautau, Lopes, Tavares & Pérez, 2021
- Ascandra minchini Borojevic, 1966
- Ascandra oceanusvitae Klautau, Lopes, Tavares & Pérez, 2021
- Ascandra sertularia Haeckel, 1872
- Ascandra spalatensis Klautau, Imesek, Azevedo, Plese, Nikolic & Cetkovic, 2016
