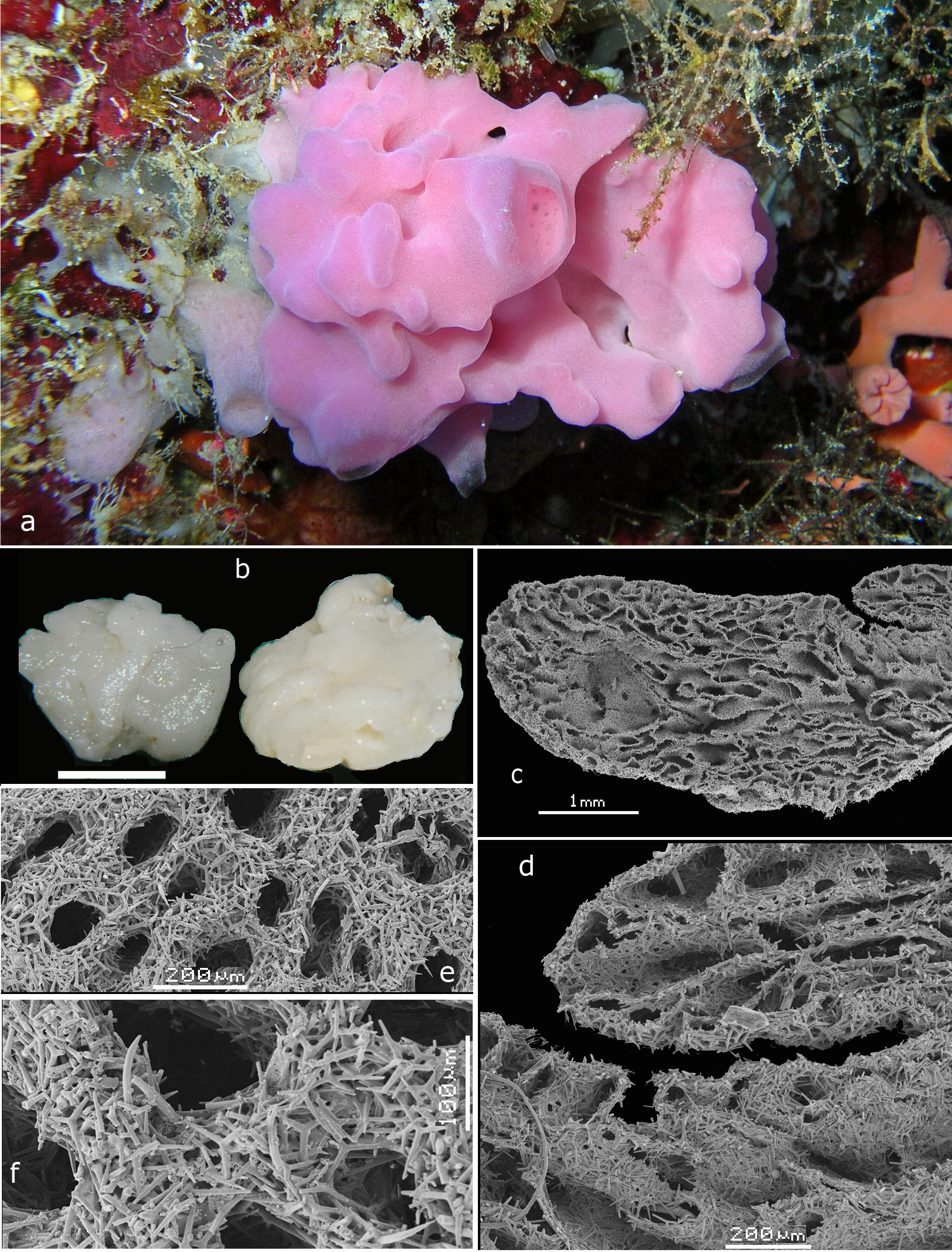
- Leucascus schleyeri

Scientific classification
- Kingdom: Animalia
- Phylum: Porifera
- Class: Calcarea
- Order: Clathrinida
- Family: Leucascidae
- Genus: Leucascus; Dendy, 1893

= Leucascus =

Genus of sponges

Leucascus is a genus of sponges belonging to the family Leucascidae.

The species of this genus are found in Southern Hemisphere.

Species:

- Leucascus albus Cavalcanti, Rapp & Klautau, 2013
- Leucascus boomerang Klautau, Lopes, Tavares, Rizzieri, Sorokin, Fromont, Goudie, Crowther, McCormack, George & Wahab, 2024
- Leucascus clavatus Dendy, 1893
- Leucascus digitiformis Klautau, Lopes, Guarabyra, Folcher, Ekins & Debitus, 2020
- Leucascus flavus Cavalcanti, Rapp & Klautau, 2013
- Leucascus leptoraphis (Jenkin, 1908)
- Leucascus lobatus Rapp, 2004
- Leucascus neocaledonicus Borojevic & Klautau, 2000
- Leucascus polynesiensis Lopes, Pérez & Klautau, 2024
- Leucascus protogenes (Haeckel, 1872 sensu Dendy, 1891)
- Leucascus roseus Lanna, Rossi, Cavalcanti, Hajdu & Klautau, 2007
- Leucascus schleyeri Van Soest & De Voogd, 2018
- Leucascus simplex Dendy, 1892
- Leucascus tenuispinae Klautau, Lopes, Tavares & Pérez, 2021
