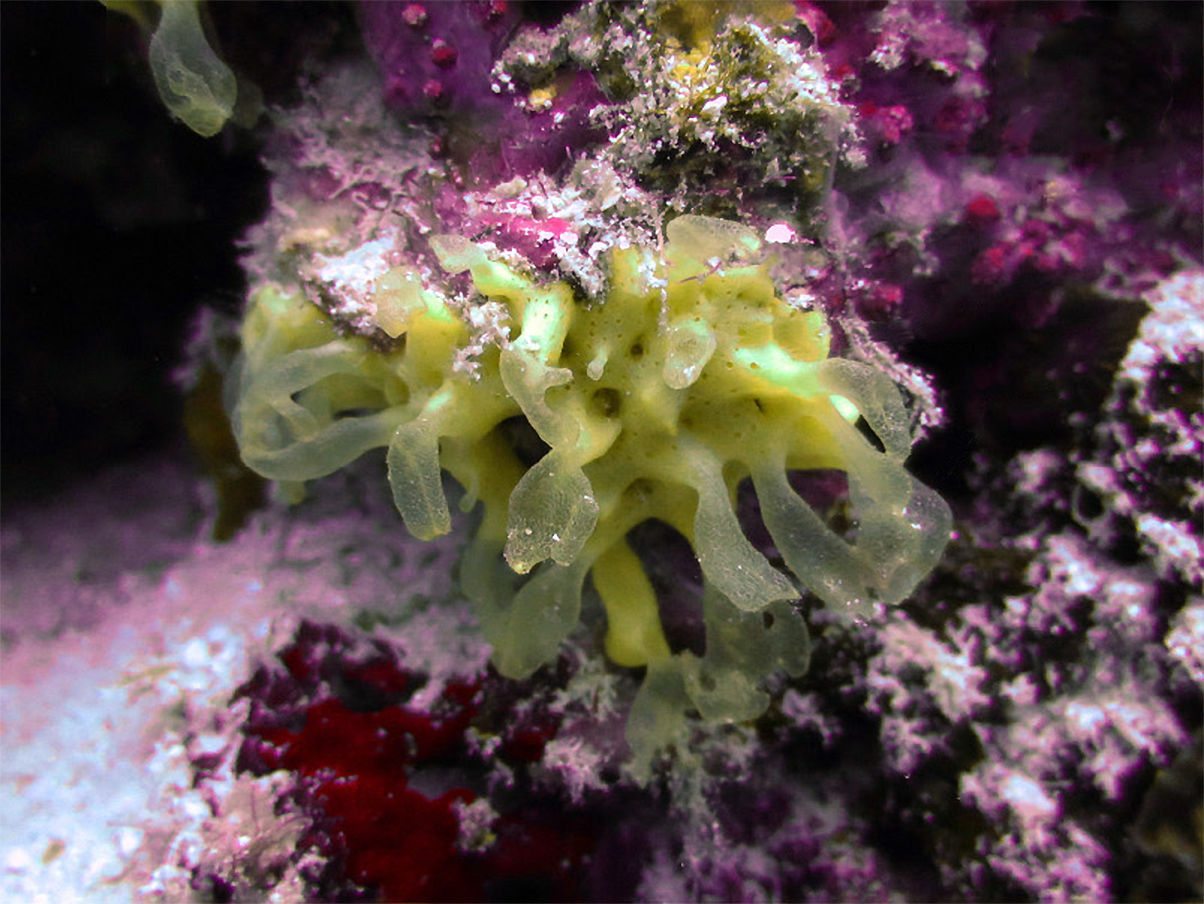
- Leuclathrina translucida

Scientific classification
- Kingdom: Animalia
- Phylum: Porifera
- Class: Calcarea
- Order: Clathrinida
- Family: Dendyidae
- Genus: Leuclathrina; Borojevic & Boury-Esnault, 1987

Type species
- Leuclathrina asconoides Borojevic & Boury-Esnault, 1987

Species
- See text.

= Leuclathrina =

Genus of sponges

Leuclathrina is a genus of sponges belonging to the family Dendyidae. Species are found in the northeast Atlantic and in the Indian Ocean.

== Description ==
These sponges are composed of an external wall sustained by triactines spicules. There is no choanosomal skeleton. The aquiferous system is composed of a mass of flagellated chambers and water canals.

== Species ==
The following species are recognised:

- Leuclathrina asconoides Borojevic & Boury-Esnault, 1987
- Leuclathrina translucida Voigt, Ruthensteiner, Leiva, Fradusco & Wörheide
