= Ascoleucetta =

Scientific classification
- Kingdom: Animalia
- Phylum: Porifera
- Class: Calcarea
- Order: Clathrinida
- Family: Leucascidae
- Genus: Ascoleucetta; Dendy & Frederick, 1924

Type species
- Ascoleucetta compressa Dendy & Frederick, 1924

Genus of sponges

Ascoleucetta is a genus of sponges in the family Leucascidae, first described in 1924 by Arthur Dendy and Leslie M. Frederick.

== Species ==
According to WORMS, accepted species in the genus are:

- Ascoleucetta compressa Dendy & Frederick, 1924
- Ascoleucetta gabensis Klautau, Lopes, Tavares, Rizzieri, Sorokin, Fromont, Goudie, Crowther, McCormack, George & Wahab, 2024
- Ascoleucetta globularis Klautau, Lopes, Tavares, Rizzieri, Sorokin, Fromont, Goudie, Crowther, McCormack, George & Wahab, 2024
- Ascoleucetta parallela Klautau, Lopes, Tavares, Rizzieri, Sorokin, Fromont, Goudie, Crowther, McCormack, George & Wahab, 2024
- Ascoleucetta plana Klautau, Lopes, Tavares, Rizzieri, Sorokin, Fromont, Goudie, Crowther, McCormack, George & Wahab, 2024
- Ascoleucetta ventricosa (Carter, 1886)
