= Robspongia =

Scientific classification
- Kingdom: Animalia
- Phylum: Porifera
- Class: Calcarea
- Order: Clathrinida
- Family: Dendyidae
- Genus: Robspongia; Klautau, Lopes, Tavares, Rizzieri, Sorokin, Fromont, Goudie, Crowther, McCormack, George & Wahab, 2024

Species
- Robspongia vociva

Genus of sponges

Robspongia is a genus of sponges belonging to the family Dendyidae, and the only species is Robspongia vociva.
