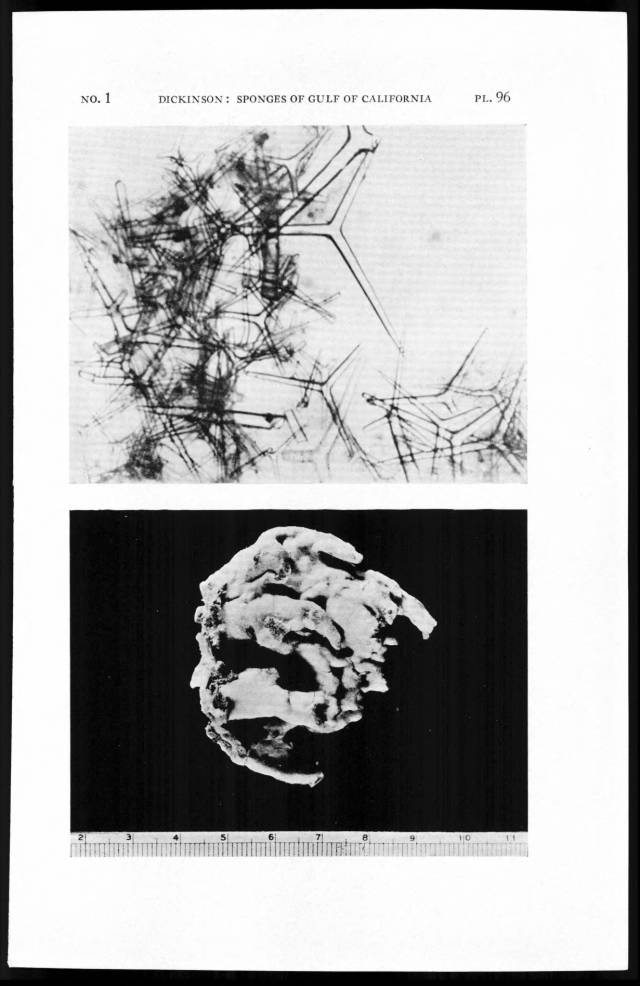
- Soleneiscus irregularis

Scientific classification
- Kingdom: Animalia
- Phylum: Porifera
- Class: Calcarea
- Order: Clathrinida
- Family: Dendyidae
- Genus: Soleneiscus; Borojevic, Boury-Esnault, Manuel & Vacelet, 2002

Species
- See text

= Soleneiscus =

Genus of sponges

Soleneiscus is a genus of calcareous sponges in the family Dendyidae.

== Species ==
According to WORMS, accepted species in the genus are:

- Soleneiscus apicalis (Brøndsted, 1931)
- Soleneiscus hamatus Voigt, Erpenbeck & Wörheide, 2017
- Soleneiscus hispidus (Brøndsted, 1931)
- Soleneiscus irregularis (Jenkin, 1908)
- Soleneiscus intermedius Klautau, Lopes, Tavares & Pérez, 2021
- Soleneiscus japonicus (Haeckel, 1872)
- Soleneiscus olynthus (Borojevic & Boury-Esnault, 1987)
- Soleneiscus pedicellatus Azevedo, Cóndor-Luján, Willenz, Hajdu, Hooker & Klautau, 2015
- Soleneiscus radovani Wörheide & Hooper, 1999
- Soleneiscus stolonifer (Dendy, 1891)
