= Ascaltis reticulum =

Scientific classification
- Domain: Eukaryota
- Kingdom: Animalia
- Phylum: Porifera
- Class: Calcarea
- Order: Clathrinida
- Family: Leucascidae
- Genus: Ascaltis
- Species: A. reticulum

Binomial name
- Ascaltis reticulum (Schmidt, 1862)

Synonyms
- List: Ascandra hermesi Breitfuss, 1897; Ascandra retiformis Haeckel, 1872; Clathrina reticulatus (Haeckel, 1870); Clathrina reticulum (Schmidt, 1862); Clathrina retiformis (Haeckel, 1872); Leucosolenia hermesi (Breitfuss, 1897); Leucosolenia reticulum (Schmidt, 1862); Nardoa reticulum Schmidt, 1862; Tarrus reticulatus Haeckel, 1870

Species of sponge

Ascaltis reticulum is a species of sea sponge the family Leucascidae. Like all sponges, it is a filter-feeder.
