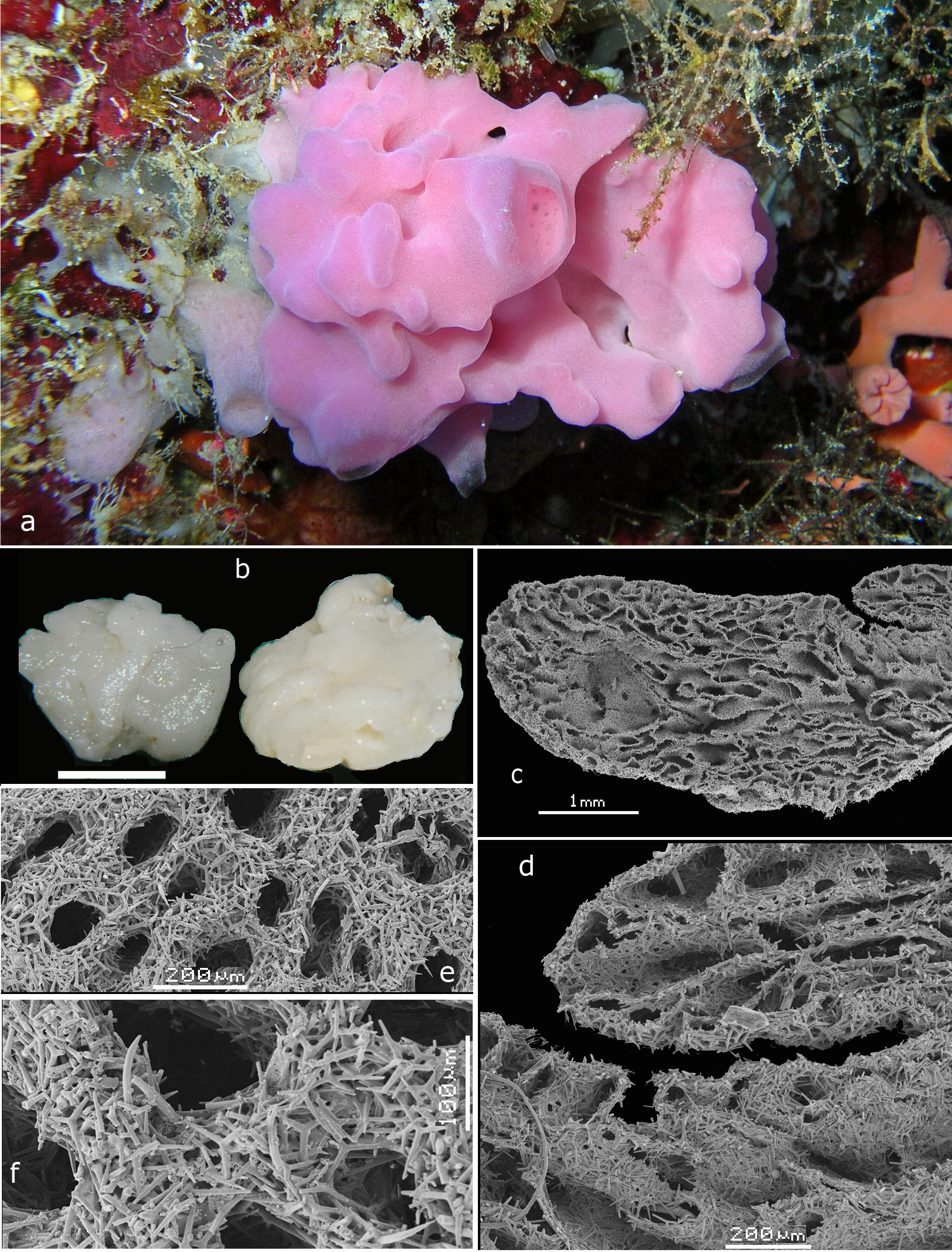

Scientific classification
- Kingdom: Animalia
- Phylum: Porifera
- Class: Calcarea
- Order: Clathrinida
- Family: Leucascidae
- Genus: Leucascus
- Species: L. schleyeri

Binomial name
- Leucascus schleyeri Van Soest & De Voogd, 2018

= Leucascus schleyeri =

Species of sponge

Leucascus schleyeri is a species of calcareous sponge in the family Leucascidae, first described by Van Soest & De Voogd in 2018.
