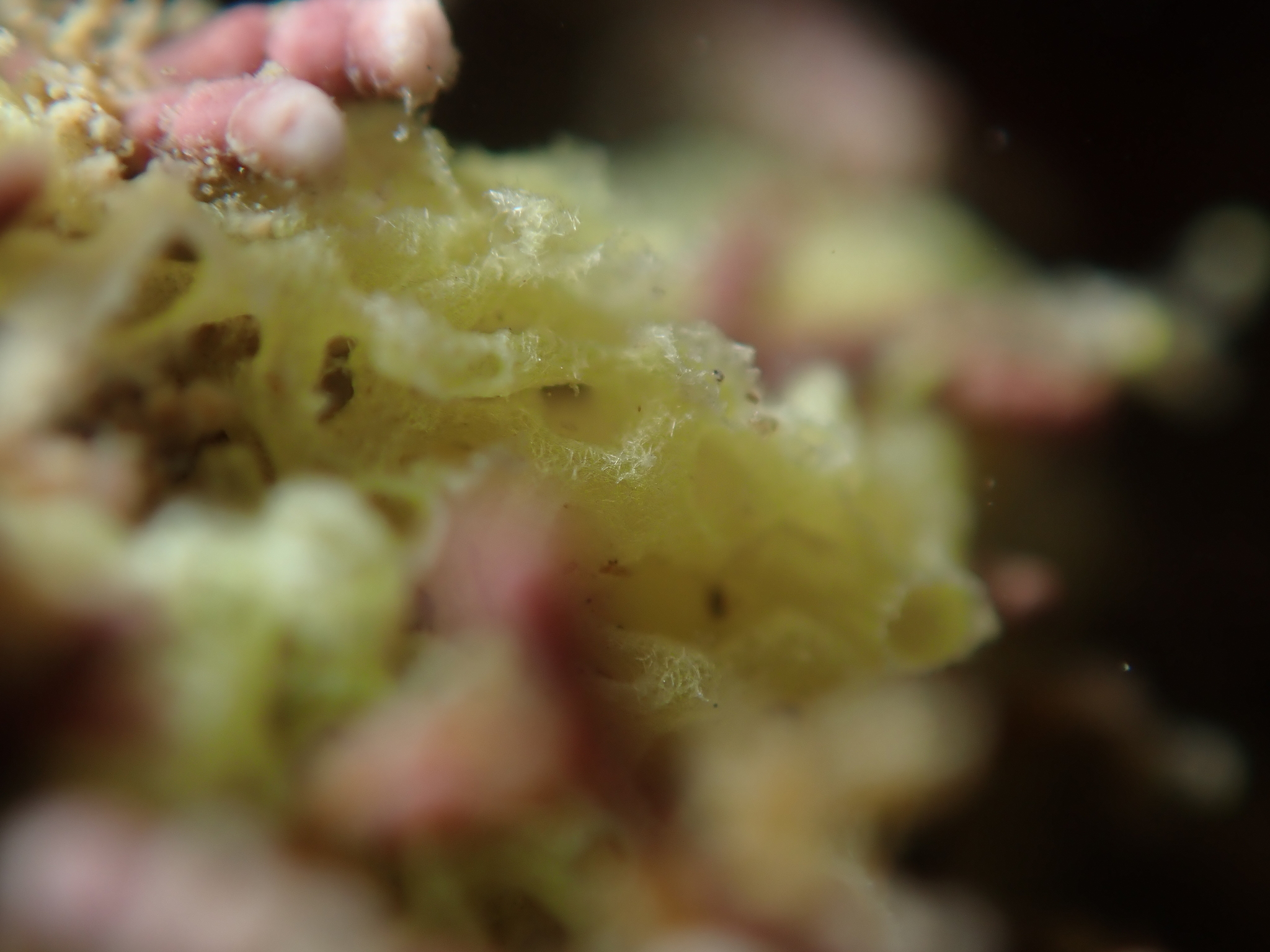
- Neoernsta naturalis

Scientific classification
- Kingdom: Animalia
- Phylum: Porifera
- Class: Calcarea
- Order: Clathrinida
- Family: Dendyidae
- Genus: Neoernsta; Deshmukh, 2023

Synonyms
- Ernstia Klautau, Azevedo, Cóndor-Luján, Rapp, Collins & Russo, 2013; Ernsta Klautau, Azevedo & Cóndor-Luján, 2021

= Neoernsta =

Genus of sponges

Neoernsta is a genus of calcareous sponges in the family Dendyidae. It was originally erected in 2013 as the genus Ernstia to contain five species previously assigned to Clathrina. This name was later replaced by Ernsta and then Neoernsta to avoid homonyms with previously described genera. The genus name honors German naturalist Ernst Haeckel for his contributions towards sponge taxonomy and phylogeny.

== Species ==
The following species are recognised in the genus Neoernsta:

- Neoernsta adunca (Fontana, Cóndor-Luján, Azevedo, Pérez & Klautau, 2018)
- Neoernsta arabica (Voigt, Erpenbeck & Wörheide, 2017)
- Neoernsta citrea (Azevedo, Padua, Moraes, Rossi, Muricy & Klautau, 2017)
- Neoernsta cordata (Haeckel, 1872)
- Neoernsta indonesiae (Van Soest & De Voogd, 2015)
- Neoernsta klautauae (Van Soest & De Voogd, 2015)
- Neoernsta laxa (Kirk, 1896)
- Neoernsta minoricensis (Lackschewitz, 1886)
- Neoernsta multispiculata (Azevedo, Padua, Moraes, Rossi, Muricy & Klautau, 2017)
- Neoernsta naturalis (Van Soest & De Voogd, 2015)
- Neoernsta pyrum (Sanamyan, Sanamyan, Martynov & Korshunova, 2019)
- Neoernsta quadriradiata (Klautau & Borojević, 2001)
- Neoernsta rocasensis (Azevedo, Padua, Moraes, Rossi, Muricy& Klautau, 2017)
- Neoernsta sagamiana (Hôzawa, 1929)
- Neoernsta sanctipauli (Azevedo, Padua, Moraes, Rossi, Muricy & Klautau, 2017)
- Neoernsta septentrionalis (Rapp, Klautau & Valentine, 2001)
- Neoernsta solaris (Azevedo, Padua, Moraes, Rossi, Muricy & Klautau, 2017)
- Neoernsta tetractina (Klautau & Borojević, 2001)
- Neoernsta variabilis (Klautau, Lopes, Guarabyra, Folcher, Ekins & Debitus, 2020)
