= Holger Valdemar Brøndsted =

Danish zoologist and author (1893–1977)

- Born: 22 July 1893; Rønne, Denmark
- Died: 14 November 1977 (aged 84); Copenhagen
- Citizenship: Denmark
- Education: Aarhus University; University of Copenhagen; Stockholm University
- Scientific career
- Thesis: Entwicklungsphysiologische Studien über Spongilla lacustris (1937)

Holger Valdemar Brøndsted (1893–1977) was a Danish zoologist, teacher and writer.

He earned his first degree from Aarhus University, and then studied natural sciences at the University of Copenhagen. This led to his working as an assistant to Professor Johan Erik Vesti Boas at the Agricultural University's zoological laboratory, as both a teacher and researcher. Following his marriage in 1919, he went to work at Birkerød State School in 1920, initially working as a part-time teacher, but 1921 as an assistant professor. This led to his writing several popular biology books. While teaching, he resumed his scientific studies, first at the Carlsberg Foundation's Biological Institute with Albert Fischer, and later at Stockholm University (1934-1936), where he earned his doctorate with the thesis, Entwicklungsphysiologische Studien über Spongilla lacustris (Studies of the developmental physiology of Spongilla lacustris). His interest in developmental physiology led to a series of lectures at Copenhagen University, and the possibility of a chair there, but war intervened.

In 1941 he became principal of Birkerød State School, where he dealt with the difficult war years. In 1948, aged 55, he was appointed professor of general zoology at Copenhagen University. He introduced cytology and experimental embryology, and the courses included histology and evolutionary theory. This position led to the writing of textbooks which also became popular science texts. Alongside his teaching and research work, he became more and more preoccupied with philosophical and religious problems which needed to be related to the biological basis of life. This concern led further books relating religious concerns to biology.

== Species named ==
- Breitfussia vitiosa (Brøndsted, 1931), as Grantia vitiosa
- Grantia transgrediens Brøndsted, 1931
- Soleneiscus hispidus (Brøndsted, 1931)
- Jenkina Brøndsted, 1931
- Leucandra gaussii (Brøndsted, 1931)

== Publications ==
=== Books ===
(Taken from the Dansk Biografisk Leksikon)

- 1928 Biologi, (Biology)
- 1939 Arternes Omdannelse (The Transformation of Species)
- 1939 The Cell and its Life (Cellen og dens Liv)
- 1942 Experiments on regeneration-problems in planarians (Copenhagen, Munksgaard)
- 1945 Gymnasiets Fremtid (The High School's Future)
- 1951 Biologi og menneskeforståelse (Biology and Human Understanding)
- 1956 Atomalderen og menneskets biologiske fremtid (The Atomic Age and the Biological Future of Man), German edition 1957, English edition 1958, French edition 1959.
- 1956 Naturerkendelse, gudserkendelse og tro (Nature recognition, god recognition and faith)
- 1964 Hvad er liv? (What is life?)
- 1969 Planarian Regeneration
- 1989, 2003 Tanker til overvejelse for os ældre (Thoughts for Consideration for the Older Ones)
- 1973 En udfordring til de yngste generationer (A Challenge to the Younger Generations)
- 1974 Et liv - tre tidsperioder (A Life - Three Periods of Time)
- 1975 Kontroversielle essays, om nogle vigtige tilværelsesproblemer (Controversial Essays, on Some Important Problems of Existence)

=== Other ===
- Brøndsted, H.V. (1931). "Die Kalkschwämme der Deutschen SüdpolarExpedition 1901-1903". Deutsche Südpolar-Expedition, 1901-03. 20: 1–47.
