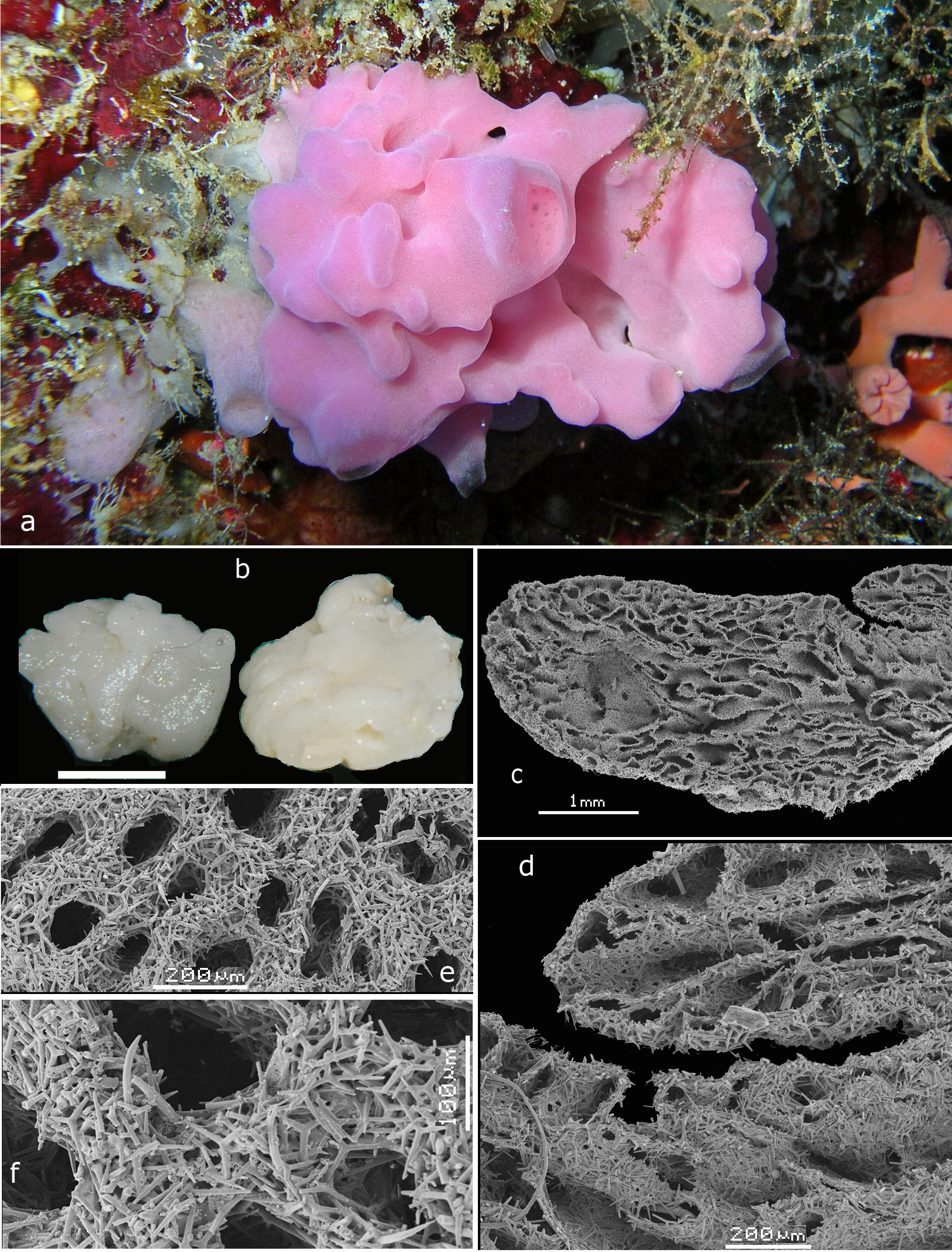
- Leucascus schleyeri

Scientific classification
- Kingdom: Animalia
- Phylum: Porifera
- Class: Calcarea
- Order: Clathrinida
- Family: Leucascidae; Dendy, 1892

Genera
- Ascaltis; Ascoleucetta; Bidderia; Leucascus

= Leucascidae =

Family of sponges

Leucascidae is a family of calcareous sponges in the order Clathrinida.
