= Leucaltidae =

Scientific classification
- Kingdom: Animalia
- Phylum: Porifera
- Class: Calcarea
- Order: Clathrinida
- Family: Leucaltidae; Dendy & Row, 1913

Genera
- Leucaltis; Leucettusa

Synonyms
- Leucettusinae Laubenfels, 1936

Family of sponges

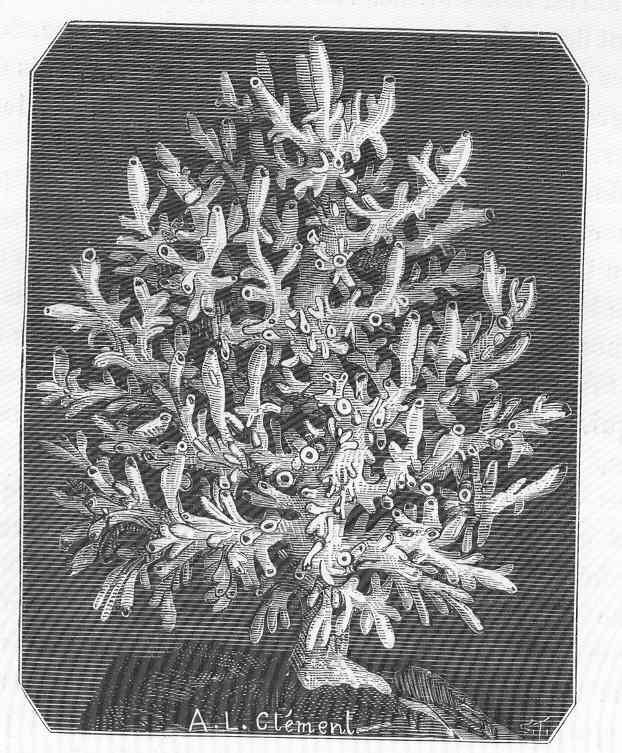
Calcareous sponge, Ascandra pinnus

Leucaltidae is a family of calcareous sponges in the order Clathrinida.
