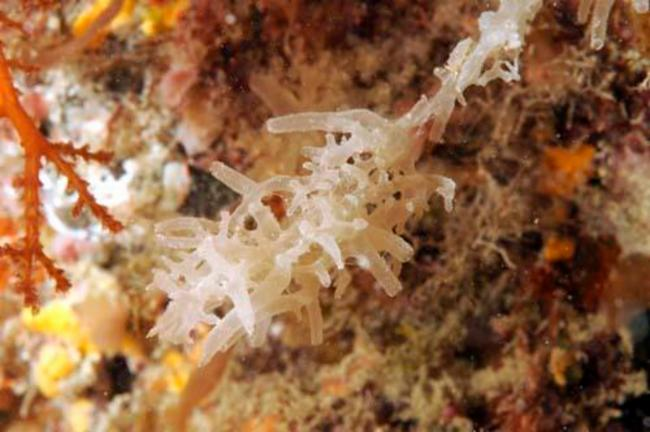

Scientific classification
- Kingdom: Animalia
- Phylum: Porifera
- Class: Calcarea
- Order: Clathrinida
- Family: Dendyidae de Laubenfels, 1936

Genera
- See text

Synonyms
- Soleneiscidae Borojevic, Boury-Esnault, Manuel and Vacelet, 2002

= Dendyidae =

Family of sponges

Dendyidae is a family of calcareous sponges, which contains six genera.

Dendyidae contains the following genera:

- Genus: Ascandra
- Genus Dendya
- Genus: Leuclathrina
- Genus: Neoernsta
- Genus Robspongia
- Genus Soleneiscus
