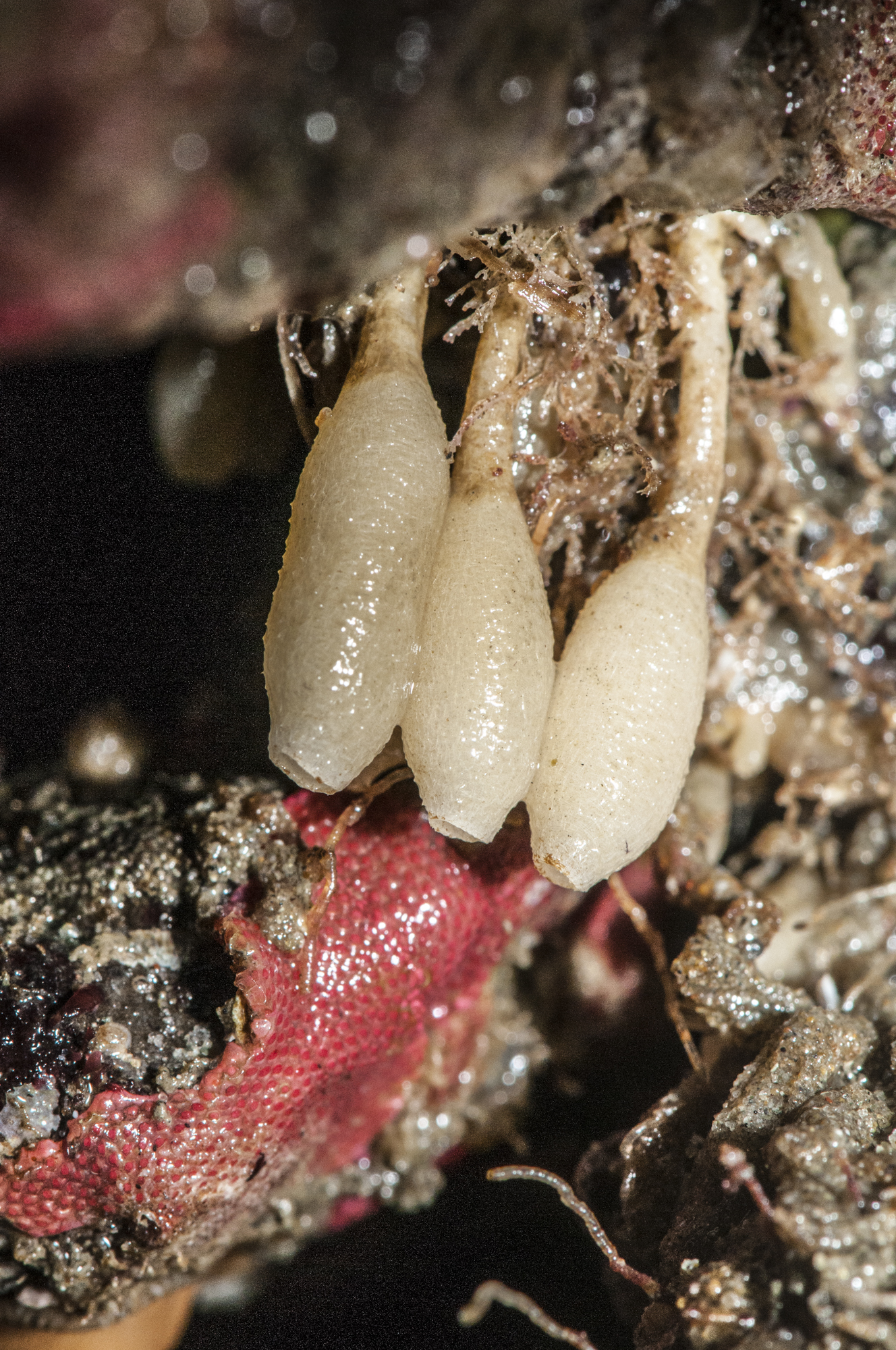

Scientific classification
- Domain: Eukaryota
- Kingdom: Animalia
- Phylum: Porifera
- Class: Calcarea
- Order: Leucosolenida
- Family: Amphoriscidae
- Genus: Leucilla
- Species: L. nuttingi

Binomial name
- Leucilla nuttingi Urban, 1902

= Leucilla nuttingi =

Species of sponge

Leucilla nuttingi is a species of calcareous sponges in the genus Leucilla.
