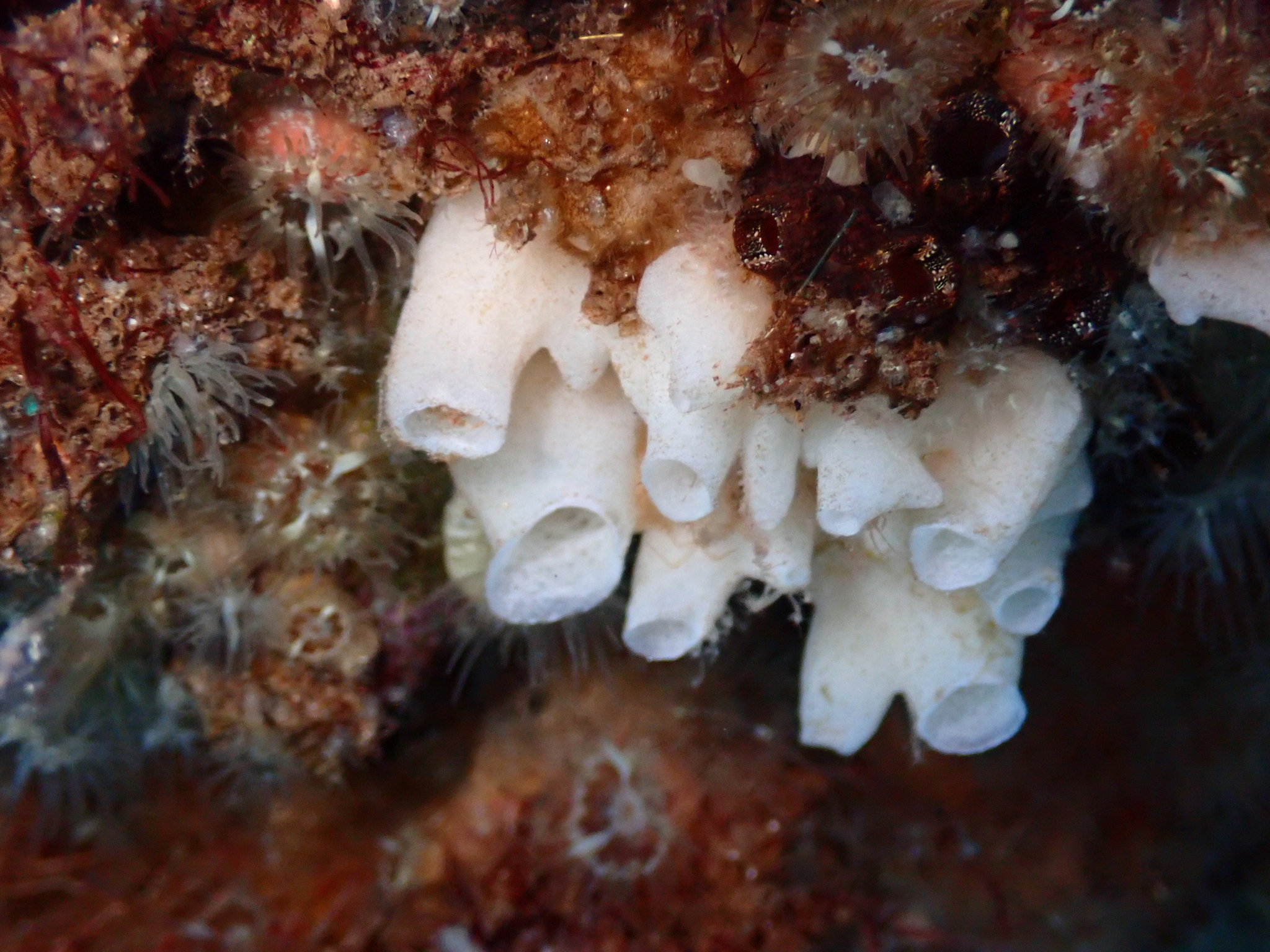

Scientific classification
- Kingdom: Animalia
- Phylum: Porifera
- Class: Calcarea
- Order: Leucosolenida
- Family: Amphoriscidae
- Genus: Paraleucilla
- Species: P. magna

Binomial name
- Paraleucilla magna Klautau, Monteiro & Borojevic, 2004

= Paraleucilla magna =

Species of sponge

Paraleucilla magna is a species of calcareous sponges in the genus Paraleucilla.
