= Ebnerella =

Ebnerella is a taxonomic synonym for:

- Amphoriscus, a genus of sea sponges
- Mammillaria, a genus of cacti
