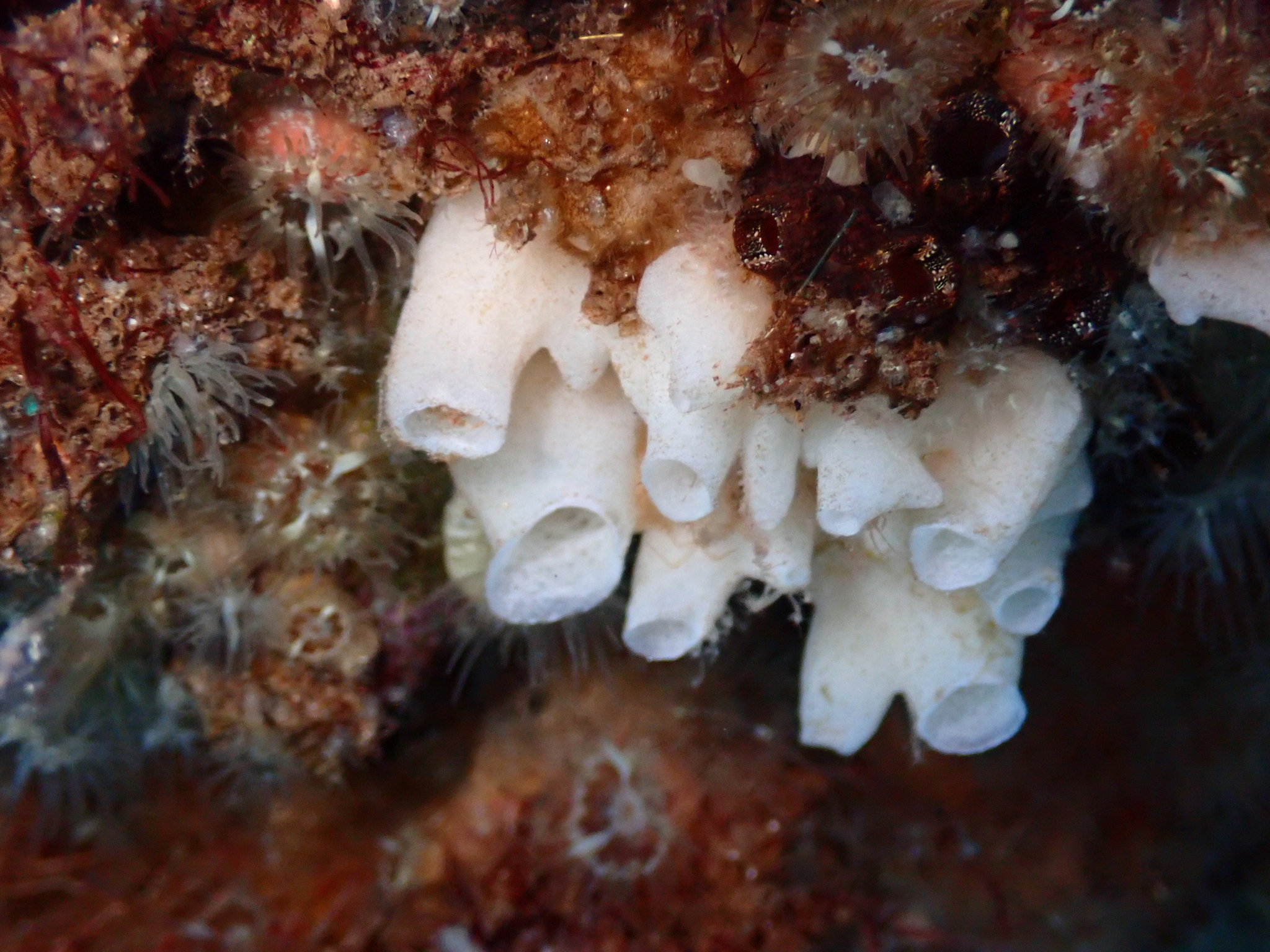

Scientific classification
- Kingdom: Animalia
- Phylum: Porifera
- Class: Calcarea
- Order: Leucosolenida
- Family: Amphoriscidae
- Genus: Paraleucilla; Dendy, 1893

= Paraleucilla =

Genus of sponges

Paraleucilla is a genus of calcareous sponges in the family Amphoriscidae.

== Species ==
The following species are recognised in the genus Paraleucilla:

- Paraleucilla crosslandi (Row, 1909)
- Paraleucilla cucumis (Haeckel, 1872)
- Paraleucilla dalmatica Klautau, Imešek, Azevedo, Pleše, Nikolić & Ćetković, 2016
- Paraleucilla erpenbecki Van Soest & De Voogd, 2018
- Paraleucilla incomposita Cavalcanti, Menegola & Lanna, 2014
- Paraleucilla magna Klautau, Monteiro & Borojevic, 2004
- Paraleucilla oca Cavalcanti, Menegola & Lanna, 2014
- Paraleucilla perlucida Azevedo & Klautau, 2007
- Paraleucilla princeps (Row & Hôzawa, 1931)
- Paraleucilla proteus (Dendy, 1913)
- Paraleucilla saccharata (Haeckel, 1872)
- Paraleucilla solangeae Cavalcanti, Menegola & Lanna, 2014
- Paraleucilla sphaerica Lanna, Cavalcanti, Cardoso, Muricy & Klautau, 2009
- Paraleucilla tarazonai Cóndor-Luján, Azevedo, Hajdu, Hooker, Willenz & Klautau, 2019
