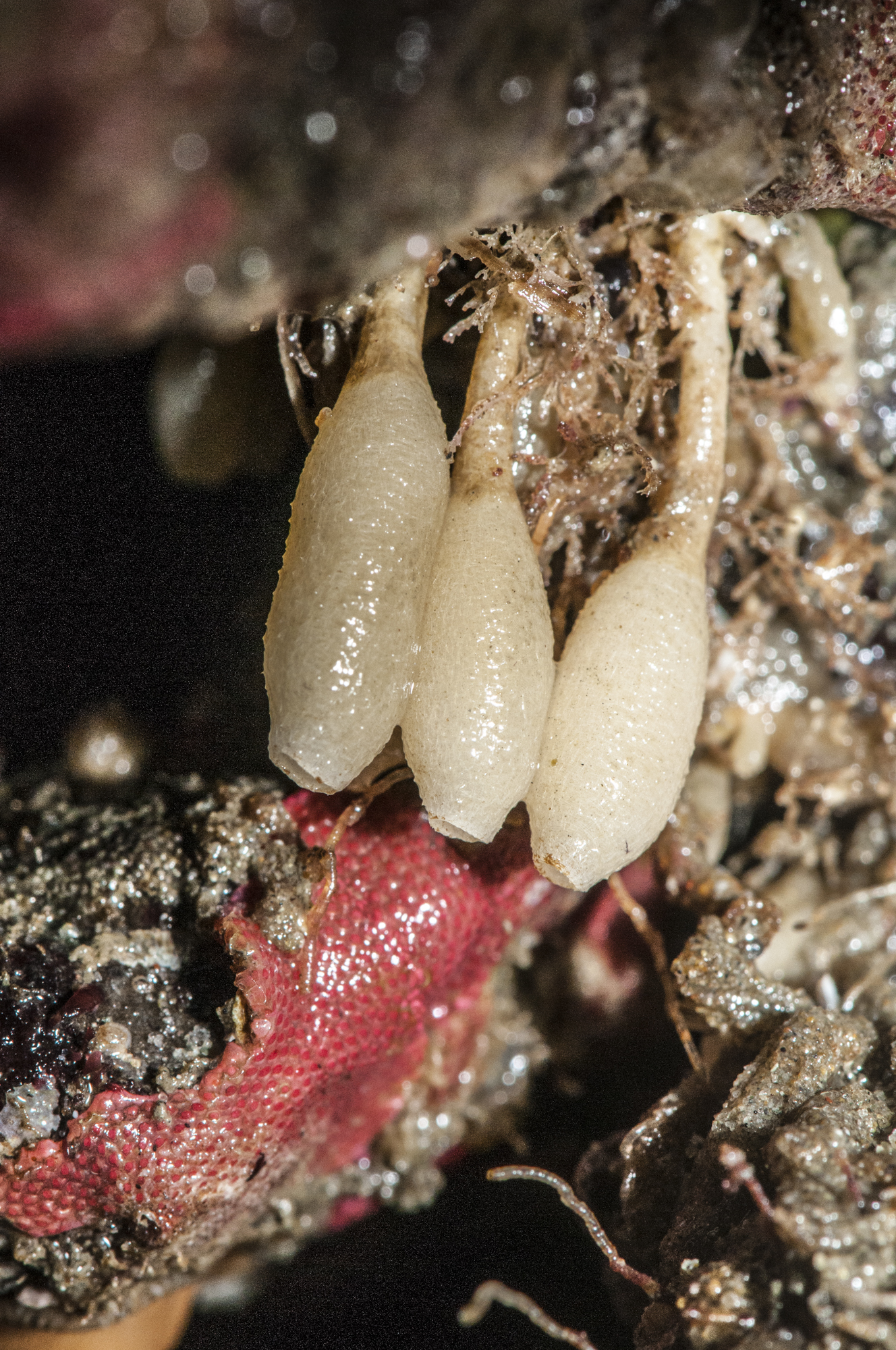

Scientific classification
- Kingdom: Animalia
- Phylum: Porifera
- Class: Calcarea
- Order: Leucosolenida
- Family: Amphoriscidae
- Genus: Leucilla; Haeckel, 1872

= Leucilla =

Genus of sponges

Leucilla is a genus of calcareous sponges in the family Amphoriscidae.

Species:

- Leucilla agitata Sim-Smith, Hickman & Kelly, 2021
- Leucilla amphora Haeckel, 1872
- Leucilla antillana Cóndor-Luján, Louzada, Hajdu & Klautau, 2018
- Leucilla capsula (Haeckel, 1870)
- Leucilla echina (Haeckel, 1872)
- Leucilla endoumensis Borojevic & Boury-Esnault, 1986
- Leucilla hirsuta Tanita, 1942
- Leucilla mancoraensis Cóndor-Luján, Azevedo, Hajdu, Hooker, Willenz & Klautau, 2019
- Leucilla micropilosa Cóndor-Luján, Louzada, Hajdu & Klautau, 2018
- Leucilla minuta Tanita, 1941
- Leucilla nuttingi (Urban, 1902)
- Leucilla oblata Row & Hôzawa, 1931
- Leucilla sacculata (Carter, 1890)
- Leucilla schauinslandi (Preiwisch, 1904)
- Leucilla uter Poléjaeff, 1883
