= Amphoriscus =

Scientific classification
- Kingdom: Animalia
- Phylum: Porifera
- Class: Calcarea
- Order: Leucosolenida
- Family: Amphoriscidae
- Genus: Amphoriscus; Haeckel, 1870

Synonyms
- Ebnerella Lendenfeld, 1891; Sycilla Haeckel, 1872; Syculmis Haeckel, 1872; Sycurus Haeckel, 1870

Genus of sponges

Amphoriscus is a genus of calcareous sponges in the family Amphoriscidae.

== Species ==
- Amphoriscus ancora Van Soest, 2017
- Amphoriscus buccichii Ebner, 1887
- Amphoriscus chrysalis (Schmidt, 1864)
- Amphoriscus cyathiscus Haeckel, 1870
- Amphoriscus cylindrus (Haeckel, 1872)
- Amphoriscus dohrni Sarà, 1960
- Amphoriscus elongatus Poléjaeff, 1883
- Amphoriscus gastrorhabdifer (Burton, 1932)
- Amphoriscus gregorii (Lendenfeld, 1891)
- Amphoriscus kryptoraphis Urban, 1908
- Amphoriscus oviparus (Haeckel, 1872)
- Amphoriscus pedunculatus Klautau, Cavalcanti & Borojevic, 2017
- Amphoriscus salfii Sarà, 1951
- Amphoriscus semoni Breitfuss, 1896
- Amphoriscus synapta (Schmidt in Haeckel, 1872)
- Amphoriscus testiparus (Haeckel, 1872)
- Amphoriscus urna Haeckel, 1872
