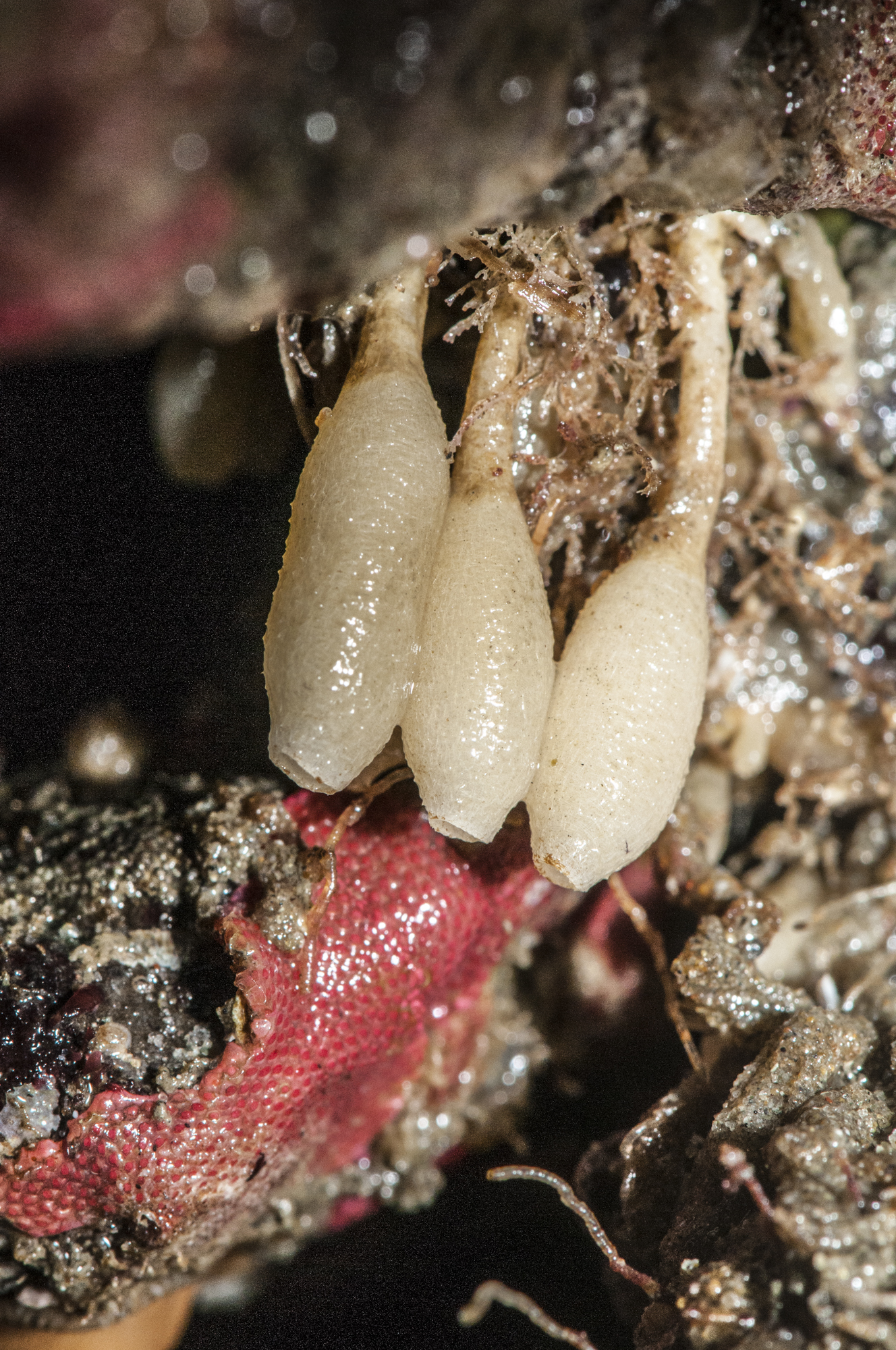
- Leucilla nuttingi

Scientific classification
- Kingdom: Animalia
- Phylum: Porifera
- Class: Calcarea
- Order: Leucosolenida
- Family: Amphoriscidae; Dendy, 1893

Genera
- Amphoriscus Haeckel, 1870; Leucilla Haeckel, 1872; Paraleucilla Dendy, 1893

= Amphoriscidae =

Family of sponges

Amphoriscidae is a family of calcareous sponges in the order Leucosolenida.
