= Hamacantha esperioides =

Scientific classification
- Kingdom: Animalia
- Phylum: Porifera
- Class: Demospongiae
- Order: Merliida
- Family: Hamacanthidae
- Genus: Hamacantha
- Subgenus: Vomerula
- Species: H. esperioides

Binomial name
- Hamacantha esperioides (Ridley & Dendy, 1886)

Synonyms
- Hamacantha esperioides (Ridley & Dendy, 1886); Vomerula esperioides (Ridley & Dendy, 1886)

Species of sponge

Hamacantha esperoides is a species of demosponge. It is commonly known as the fibrous sponge. It occurs off the southern and western coasts of South Africa, off the coast of Namibia, and off the southeast coast of South America.

== Description ==
This dirty pale yellow to beige sponge has a flattened, cavernous, bushy form. The surface rough with a conspicuous easily-detached translucent membrane (ectosome) overlying the fibrous projections. As the common name suggests, the fibrous sponge has a tough and coarsely fibrous texture. It is very compressible. It grows up to 150 mm (5.9 in) wide and 250 mm (9.8 in) long. The aquiferous system (also known as the canal system) is well developed.

=== Spicules ===
- Styles (megascleres with one end pointed and the other end rounded) are straight or slightly curved. They are wider at the base than at the tip.
- Type I diancistras: Typical in shape with a straight or slightly curved shaft.
- Type II diancistras: Shaft is curved or bends towards the middle.
- Sigmata: C-or S-shaped, with one end more strongly curved

=== Skeletal arrangement ===
The skeleton is made up of a network of styles forming polyspicular fibers that reach to the surface, running below the ectosome and branching to form narrower fibers. These fibers are densely covered in type I diancistras. Type II diancistras and sigmata are scattered throughout the sponge.

== Distribution and habitat ==
The fibrous sponge occurs the southern and western coasts of South Africa, off the coast of Namibia and off southeast South America, at Río de la Plata. This a deep-water sponge and has been observed at depth between 17 metres (56 ft) and 1,110 metres (3,640 ft).
