= Chondrilla =

Chondrilla is the scientific name shared by two genera of life-forms:

- Chondrilla (plant), a plant genus in family Asteraceae
- Chondrilla (sponge), a sea sponge genus
