= Dendrilla =

Scientific classification
- Domain: Eukaryota
- Kingdom: Animalia
- Phylum: Porifera
- Class: Demospongiae
- Order: Dendroceratida
- Family: Darwinellidae
- Genus: Dendrilla

Genus of sponges

Dendrilla is a genus of sponges belonging to the family Darwinellidae.

The species of this genus are found in Southern Hemisphere and Southern Europe.

Species:

- Dendrilla acantha Vacelet, 1958
- Dendrilla antarctica Topsent, 1905
- Dendrilla cactos (Selenka, 1867)
- Dendrilla cactus
- Dendrilla camera (Laubenfels, 1936)
- Dendrilla cavenosa
- Dendrilla cirroides
- Dendrilla cirsioides Topsent, 1893
- Dendrilla cruor (Carter, 1886)
- Dendrilla lacunosa Hentschel, 1912
- Dendrilla lendenfeldi Hentschel, 1912
- Dendrilla membranosa (Pallas, 1766)
- Dendrilla mertoni Hentschel, 1912
- Dendrilla praetensa
- Dendrilla rosea Lendenfeld, 1883
