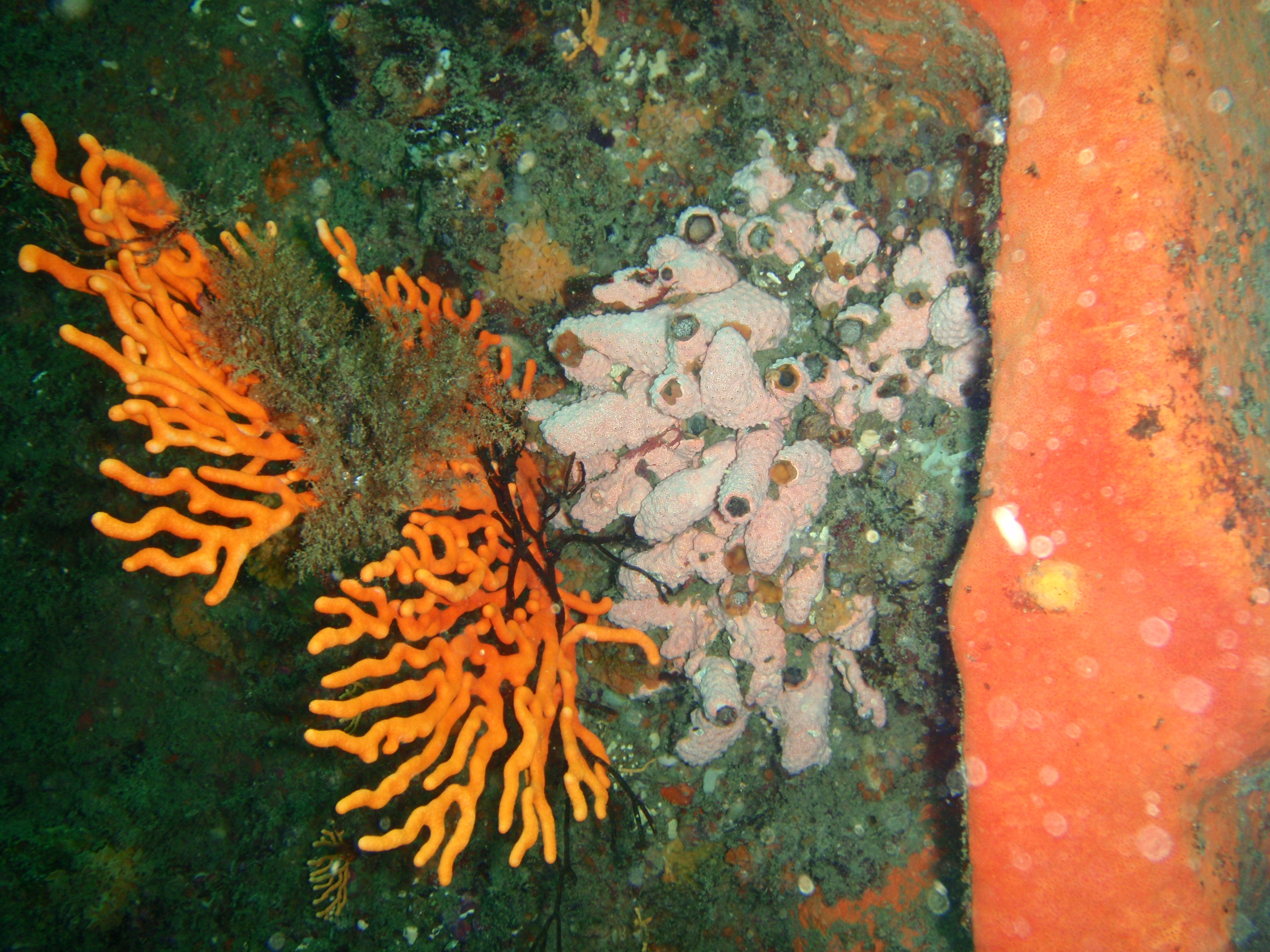

Scientific classification
- Kingdom: Animalia
- Phylum: Porifera
- Class: Demospongiae
- Order: Trachycladida
- Family: Trachycladidae
- Genus: Trachycladus
- Species: T. spinispirulifer

Binomial name
- Trachycladus spinispirulifer (Carter, 1879)

Synonyms
- Spirastrella dilatata Kieschnick, 1896; Spirastrella spinispirulifera (Carter, 1879); Suberites spinispirulifer Carter, 1879; Trachycladus spinispirulifera [lapsus]

= Orange wall sponge =

Species of sponge

The orange wall sponge (Trachycladus spinispirulifer) is a species of sea sponge belonging to the order Trachycladida. It is found in the south Atlantic and Indo-Pacific oceans. Around the South African coast, it is known from the Cape Peninsula to Cape Agulhas.

== Description ==
The orange wall sponge may grow to 20 cm (7.9 in) thick and up to 2 m (6.6 ft) in length. It is a very large firm orange-skinned sponge with a yellow interior. It grows as a wall and does not show obvious oscula. The largely smooth surface is somewhat ridged and contains unevenly distributed rough patches. It has a corky consistency.

=== Spicules ===
The following spicules make up the skeleton of this species:

- Long, thin and slightly curved tylostyles (megascleres with a point at one end and a knob at the other).
- Characteristic spinispires. These are mostly c-shaped with the ends curved in a different plane to the rest of the spicule. Spines occur on only the convex surface.

=== Skeleton ===
The sponge is made of scattered tylostyles with the heads on the substrate and the tips piecing the sponge surface. The ectosome is made of densely packed spinispires, with more scattered throughout the choanosome.

== Distribution and habitat ==
This sponge is known from the south and west coasts of South Africa, Namibia, the South Atlantic, the Vema Seamount, Australia, New Zealand, Ternate, and Zanzibar. It lives on rocky reefs at depths of 5–350 m (16–1,148 ft). It is commonly found on vertical rock faces and in crevices.
