= Hamacantha =

Scientific classification
- Kingdom: Animalia
- Phylum: Porifera
- Class: Demospongiae
- Order: Merliida
- Family: Hamacanthidae
- Genus: Hamacantha (Gray, 1867)

Type species
- Hamacantha johnsoni (Bowerbank, 1864)

Subgenera and species
- See text

Synonyms
- Athnacama de Laubenfels, 1936; Crellancistra de Laubenfels, 1936; Evomerula de Laubenfels, 1936; Hypsispongia de Laubenfels, 1935; Vomerula Schmidt, 1880

Genus of sponges

Hamacantha is a genus of sponges in the family Hamacanthidae. This species in this genus differ from those in the other genera in this family through the presence of diancistras, distinctive microscleres. These are thought to aid in framing the skeleton by joining monactine megascleres (that is megascleres that grow in only a single direction). This genus contains 30 species in three subgenera.

== Species ==
The following species are recognised:

Subgenus Hamacantha (Hamacantha) (Gray, 1867)

- Hamacantha (Hamacantha) boomerang (Hajdu & Castello-Branco, 2014)
- Hamacantha (Hamacantha) hortae Santín, (Grinyó Uriz & Gili &, 2021)
- Hamacantha (Hamacantha) johnsoni (Bowerbank, 1864)
- Hamacantha (Hamacantha) lundbecki (Topsent, 1904)
- Hamacantha (Hamacantha) schmidtii (Carter, 1882)
- Hamacantha (Hamacantha) simplex (Burton, 1959)

Subgenus Hamacantha (Vomerula) Schmidt, 1880

- Hamacantha (Vomerula) acerata (Lévi, 1993)
- Hamacantha (Vomerula) agassizi (Topsent, 1920)
- Hamacantha (Vomerula) atoxa (Lévi, 1993)
- Hamacantha (Vomerula) azorica (Topsent, 1904)
- Hamacantha (Vomerula) bowerbanki (Lundbeck, 1902)
- Hamacantha (Vomerula) carteri (Topsent, 1904)
- Hamacantha (Vomerula) cassanoi (Lehnert & Stone, 2016)
- Hamacantha (Vomerula) esperioides (Ridley & Dendy, 1886)
- Hamacantha (Vomerula) falcula (Bowerbank, 1874)
- Hamacantha (Vomerula) forcipulata (Lévi, 1993)
- Hamacantha (Vomerula) integra (Topsent, 1904), Fibrous sponge
- Hamacantha (Vomerula) jeanvaceleti (Castello-Branco & Hajdu, 2018)
- Hamacantha (Vomerula) klausruetzleri (Castello-Branco & Hajdu, 2018)
- Hamacantha (Vomerula) mamoi (Ise, Woo, Tan & Fujita, 2019)
- Hamacantha (Vomerula) megancistra (Pulitzer-Finali, 1978)
- Hamacantha (Vomerula) microxifera (Lopes & Hajdu, 2004)
- Hamacantha (Vomerula) mindanaensis (Wilson, 1925)
- Hamacantha (Vomerula) papillata (Vosmaer, 1885)
- Hamacantha (Vomerula) popana (de Laubenfels, 1935)
- Hamacantha (Vomerula) tenda (Schmidt, 1880)
- Hamacantha (Vomerula) tibicen (Schmidt, 1880)
- Hamacantha (Vomerula) umisachii (Ise, Woo, Tan & Fujita, 2019)

Subgenus Hamacantha (Zygherpe) (Laubenfels, 1932)

- Hamacantha (Zygherpe) desmacelloides (Hajdu, Hooker & Willenz, 2015)
- Hamacantha (Zygherpe) hyaloderma (Laubenfels, 1932)
