= Halisarca caerulea =

Scientific classification
- Kingdom: Animalia
- Phylum: Porifera
- Class: Demospongiae
- Order: Chondrillida
- Family: Halisarcidae
- Genus: Halisarca
- Species: H. caerulea

Binomial name
- Halisarca caerulea Vacelet & Donadey, 1987

Species of sponge

Halisarca caerulea is a species of sponge in the family Halisarcidae. It is native to the Caribbean Sea and was first described in 1987 by the French marine biologists Jean Vacelet and Claude Donadey.

== Description ==
Halisarca caerulea is a thinly encrusting species forming patches about 1.5 mm (0.06 in) thick. The texture is fleshy, and the skin is strengthened by the presence of bundles of collagen fibres which give a reticulated pattern to the smooth, slightly slimy surface. This sponge has long tubular, choanocyte chambers, which are sometimes branched, and no spicules. The oscula are about 3 mm (0.12 in) in diameter, each being at the centre of a conspicuous star-shaped group of superficial canals. These star-shaped systems are separated by smooth areas and are regularly arranged over the surface of the sponge, which is a bright blue colour in living specimens.

== Ecology ==
Sponges feed by drawing water in through small pores, filtering out the bacteria and organic particles and pumping the water out through the oscula. The waters of the Caribbean are very poor in nutrients, and researchers found that this sponge had to pump large quantities of water in order to extract sufficient essential nutrients for its requirements. From the amount of carbon filtered out of the water, theoretically the sponges should have grown rapidly, but in fact they hardly grew at all. The researchers found that the choanocyte cells were dividing every five or six hours. Although they were proliferating so rapidly, growth was minimal; there was no evidence of cell death, but instead, the sponge was sloughing off choanocyte cells almost as fast as they were formed. The researchers hypothesized that the fast turnover in cells might be useful in coping with the pollutants and toxins contained in the water that the sponge inevitably encountered while filter feeding. It has since been realised that in casting off this cell debris, the sponges are part of a sponge loop, absorbing large quantities of dissolved organic carbon, and returning the carbon to the water column as detritus, which is available for consumption by other animals.
