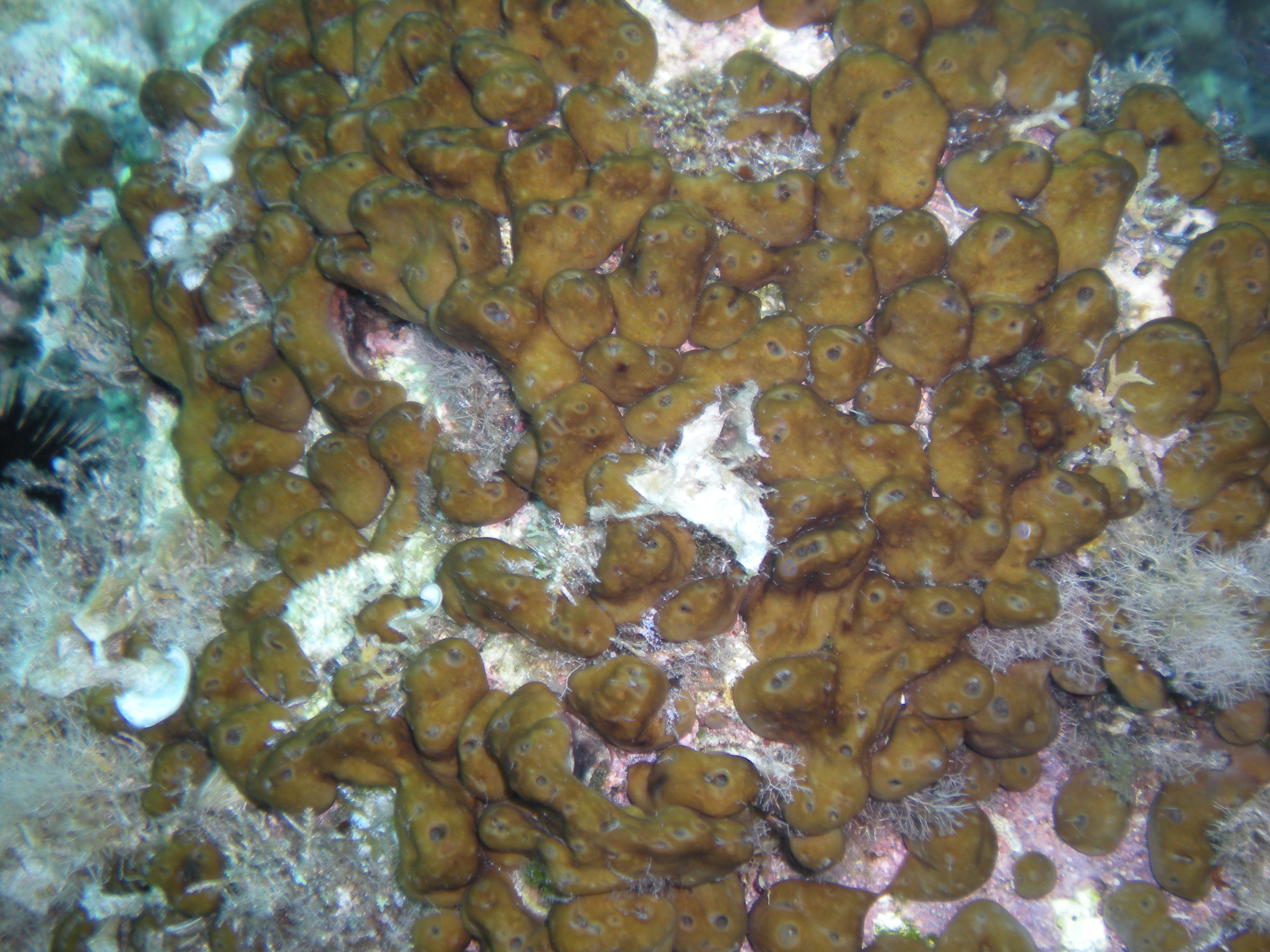

Scientific classification
- Kingdom: Animalia
- Phylum: Porifera
- Class: Demospongiae
- Family: Chondrillidae
- Genus: Chondrilla
- Species: C. nucula

Binomial name
- Chondrilla nucula Schmidt, 1862

Synonyms
- Chondrilla embolophora Schmidt, 1862

= Chondrilla nucula =

Species of sponge

Chondrilla nucula, sometimes called the Caribbean chicken-liver sponge, is a species of sea sponge belonging to the family Chondrillidae.

It is an amorphous shaped sponge that grows in flat, sometimes bulbous sheets in benthic communities, often as an epibiont of other benthic organisms including algae, bivalves, crustaceans, ascidians, seagrasses, and also other sponges, without making evident damage.

Chondrilla sponges are know symbionts of photosynthetic microorganisms. By harbouring cyanobacteria, they can combine the typical heterotropihc diet with supplements coming from the photosynthetic activity of the algae. However, this strategy is flexible, and the sponge is sometimes found in marginal, stressful systems such as caves. Such sponges are white, lacking access to sunlight, and photosymbionts. This sponge also hosts strains of bacteria that contained antimicrobial properties. These properties have been shown to inhibit certain bacteria which are harmful to human including Staphylococcus aureus.

It is known to be preyed upon by the hawksbill turtle, Eretmochelys imbricata.
