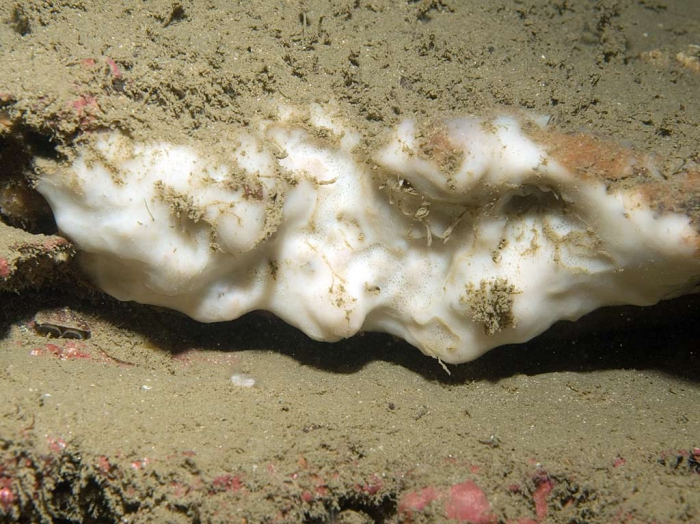
- In Ireland

Scientific classification
- Kingdom: Animalia
- Phylum: Porifera
- Class: Demospongiae
- Family: Chondrillidae
- Genus: Thymosia; Topsent, 1895
- Species: T. guernei

Binomial name
- Thymosia guernei Topsent, 1895

= Thymosia =

Genus of sponges

Thymosia is a genus of sea sponges in the order Chondrillida. It is monotypic, being represented by the single species, Thymosia guernei. Typically encountered on vertical rock surfaces or beneath rock overhangs in regions subject to moderately robust wave action and tidal currents, it is commonly observed on limestone substrates at depths ranging from 15 to 30 meters.

== History ==
After its initial discovery by French zoologist Émile Topsent in Concarneau, France, in 1896, Thymosia guernei remained elusive until it was rediscovered through dredging off Plymouth's Mewstone Grounds in 1956. Subsequent sightings occurred in Roscoff and, notably, by a diver at Lundy in 1971. Diver observations have since revealed a south-westerly distribution in the British Isles, with a preference for offshore islands, being infrequently found on the mainland.

== Description ==
Thymosia guerni, displaying an off-white hue, often adopts a massive and lumpy structure, reaching patches up to 1 meter across. Its attachment to the substrate is secure, facilitated by a broad encrusting base. In appearance, it resembles cold mashed potato. Its irregular surface and white colour in a sponge of its size are quite particular.

This sponge exhibits a diverse range of forms, from thin sheets to low, spreading, massive-lobose structures that can form patches up to 60cm across. Firmly attached by a broad encrusting base, it presents an overall appearance reminiscent of cold mashed potato. The surface is clean, smooth, and undulating, occasionally raised into angular projections due to the inclusion of other sedentary organisms. The off-white surface hides a pale grey-orange interior, and the sponge has a slight smell.

Its consistency is solid and rubbery, with a thin covering of slime that becomes apparent when silt falls onto the surface. The sponge features a few small oscules scattered along ridges and lobes, often occupied by crustaceans and brittle stars, while countless microscopic pores cover the surface. In mature sponges, these pores concentrate at the base of deep hollows formed by steep-sided lobes. The sponge does not exhibit noticeable contraction. Additionally, double openings of the mud-lined burrows of the polychaete worm Polydora are sometimes observed at the surface.

The sponge lacks a mineral skeleton; instead, it features a robust cortex abundantly reinforced by fibrillar collagen, enhancing the otherwise soft matrix. Spongin fibers, characterized by unique kidney-shaped swellings, provide additional strength by vertically traversing the body to the surface, where they branch and anastomose at distinct intervals.

== Distribution ==
Thymosia guernia is considered to be rare. It has recently been discovered off several islands off South West England and Western Ireland, including Aran Islands in County Galway, Clare Island in County Mayo, Skokholm, and Lundy. Additionally, it is occasionally found off the mainland, such as in North Pembrokeshire (off Abereiddy), St. Johns Point in County Donegal, France (Concarneau), and Portugal (Algarve).
