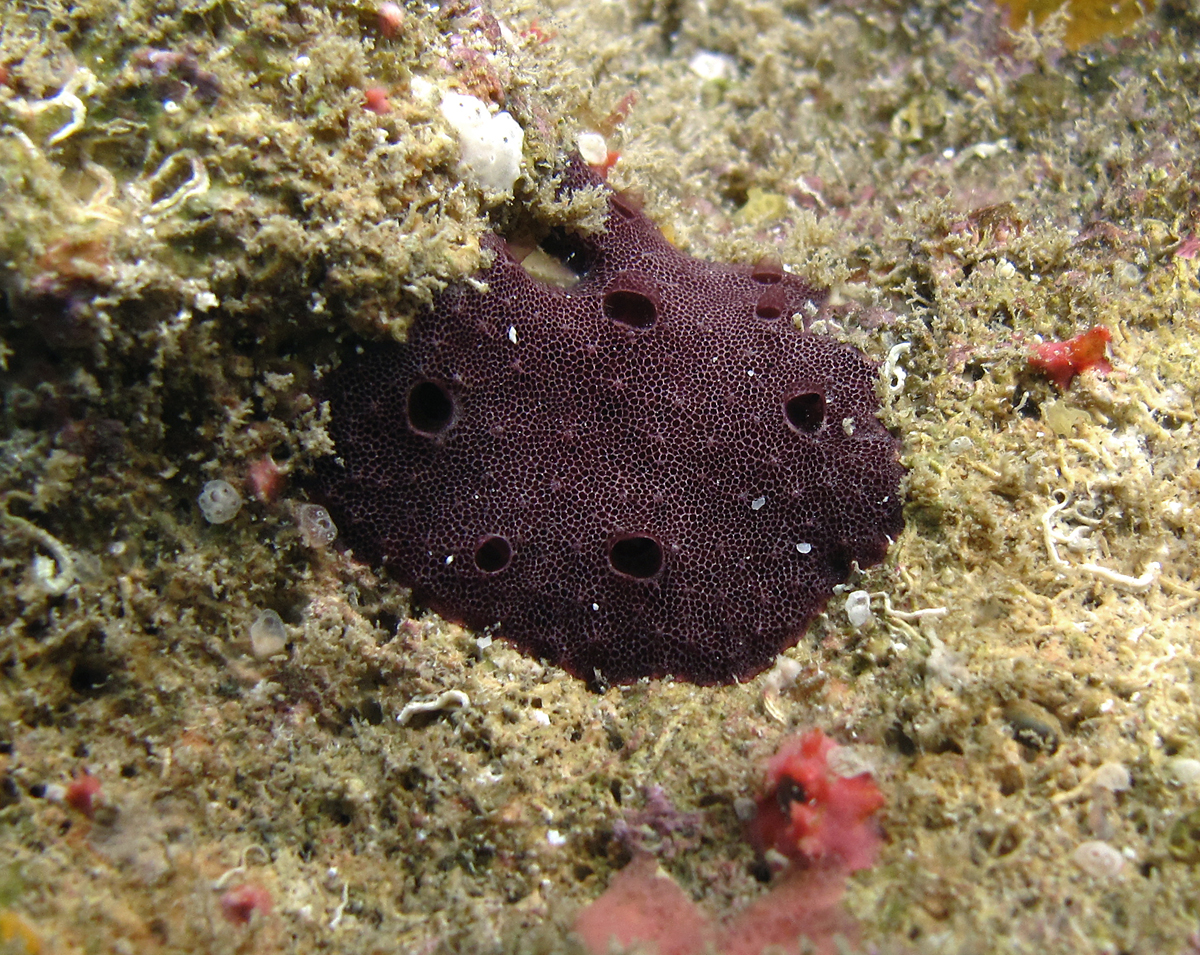
- Chelonaplysilla violacea

Scientific classification
- Kingdom: Animalia
- Phylum: Porifera
- Class: Demospongiae
- Order: Dendroceratida
- Family: Darwinellidae
- Genus: Chelonaplysilla de Laubenfels 1948

= Chelonaplysilla =

Genus of sponges

Chelonaplysilla is a genus of sponges in the family Darwinellidae.

== Species ==
- Chelonaplysilla americana van Soest, 2017
- Chelonaplysilla arenosa (Topsent, 1925)
- Chelonaplysilla aurea Bergquist, 1995
- Chelonaplysilla betinensis Zea & van Soest, 1986
- Chelonaplysilla delicata Pulitzer-Finali & Pronzato, 1999
- Chelonaplysilla erecta (Row, 1911)
- Chelonaplysilla incrustans (Carter, 1876)
- Chelonaplysilla noevus (Carter, 1876)
- Chelonaplysilla psammophila (Topsent, 1928)
- Chelonaplysilla supjiensis Jeon & Sim, 2008
- Chelonaplysilla violacea (Lendenfeld, 1883)
