= Darwiniella =

Darwiniella is the scientific name for several genera of organisms and may refer to:

- Darwiniella (crustacean) Anderson, 1992, a genus of barnacles in the family Pyrgomatidae
- Darwiniella (fungus) Speg., 1888, a genus of fungi
- Darwiniella (orchid) Braas & Lückel, 1982, an illegitimate name for a genus of plants in the family Orchidaceae

== See also ==
- Darwinella, a genus of sponge in the family Darwinellidae
