= Darwinella =

Darwinella may refer to:

- Darwinella (sponge), a genus of sponges in the family Darwinellidae
- Darwinella, a genus of beetles in the family Promecheilidae, synonym of Pseudodarwinella
- Darwinella, a fossil genus of ostracods in the family Darwinulidae, synonym of Darwinula
