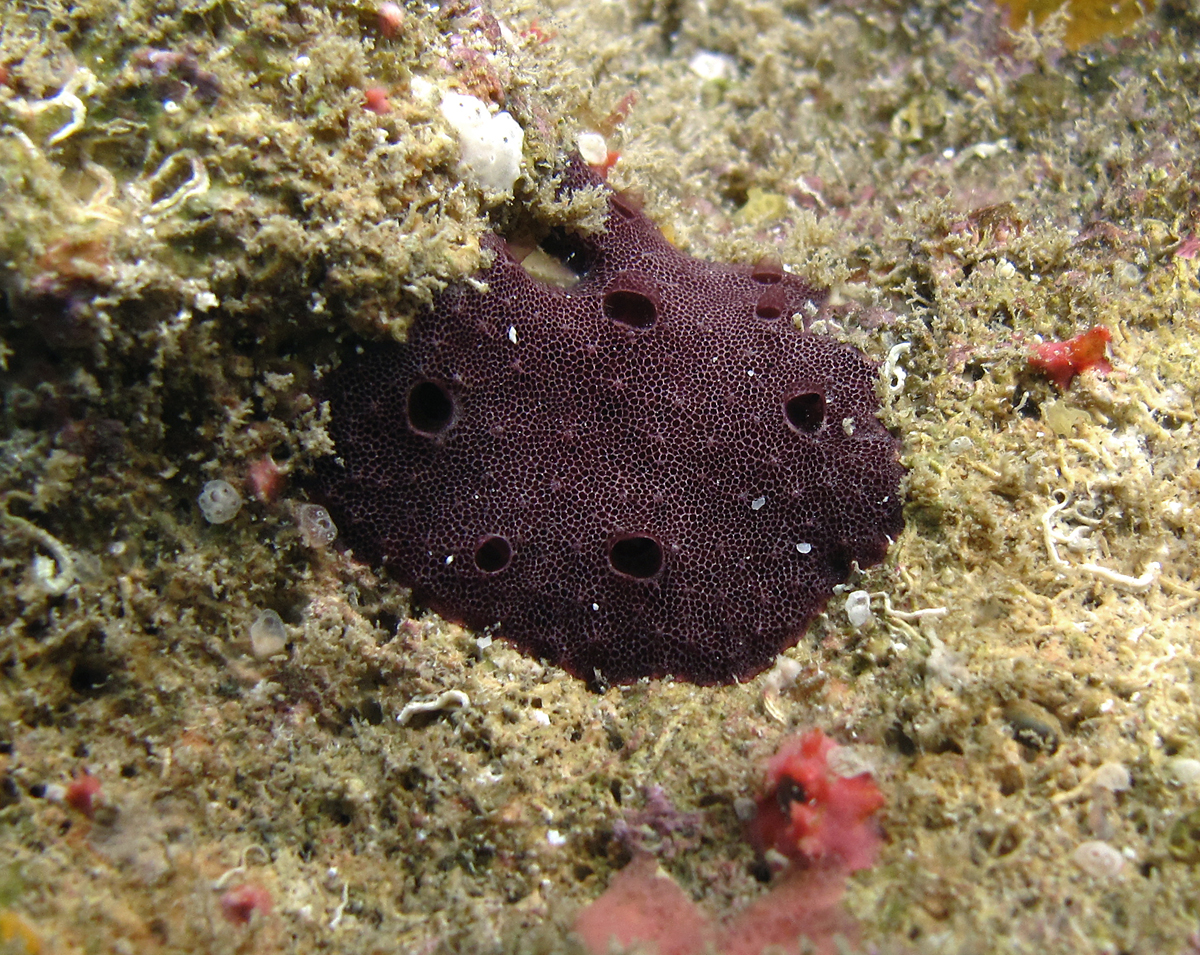
- Chelonaplysilla violacea off Réunion

Scientific classification
- Kingdom: Animalia
- Phylum: Porifera
- Class: Demospongiae
- Subclass: Keratosa; Grant, 1861

Orders
- Dendroceratida Minchin, 1900; Dictyoceratida Minchin, 1900

= Keratosa =

Subclass of sponges

Keratosa, the keratose sponges or horny sponges, is a subclass of demosponges.

Keratosa sponges are nonspicular demosponges with organic spongin fibers forming flexible skeletons.

Recently discovered in the Andaman and Nicobar Islands, these sponges contribute to reef structures in tropical regions.
