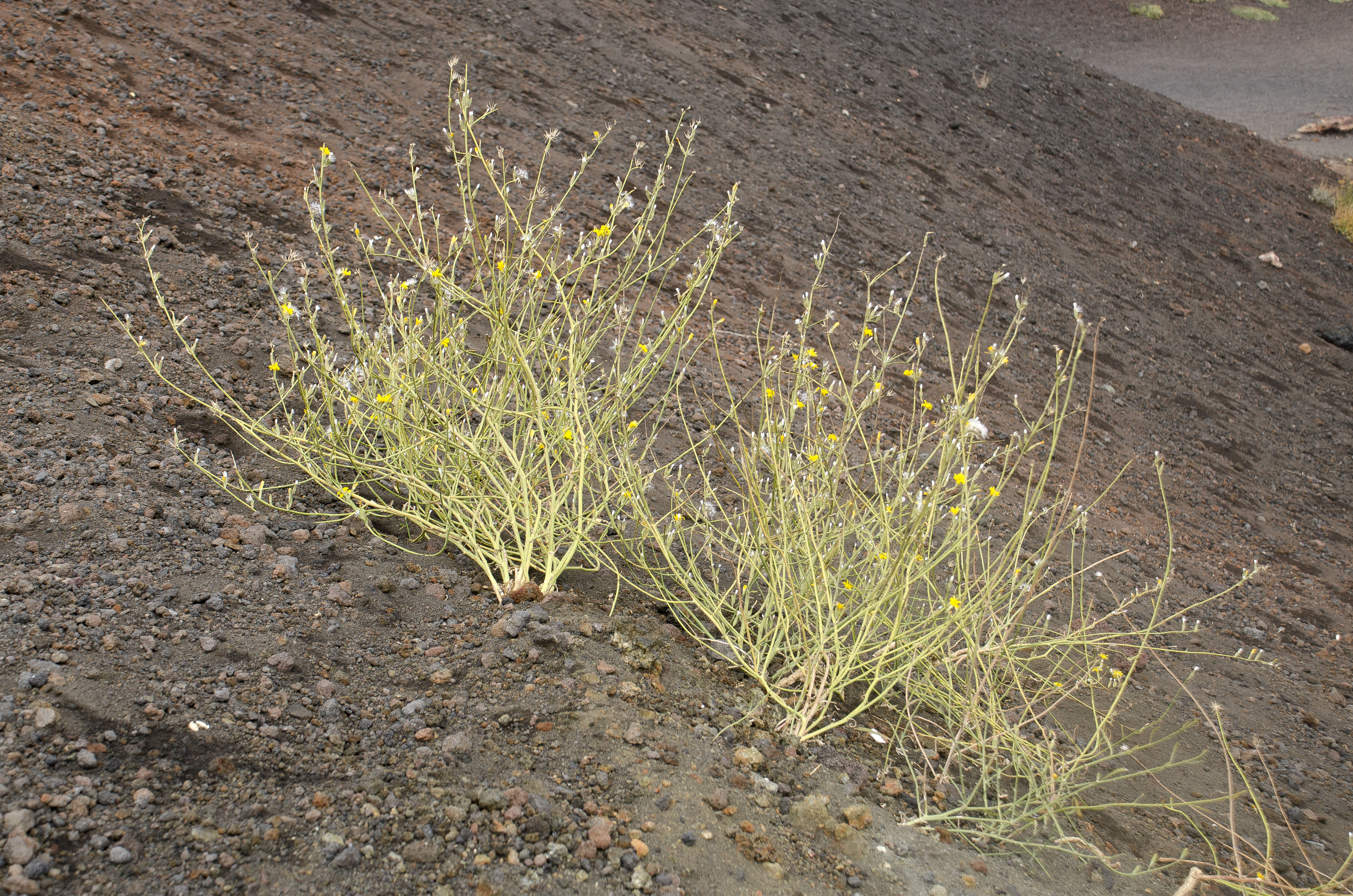
- Chondrilla juncea

Scientific classification
- Kingdom: Plantae
- Clade: Tracheophytes
- Clade: Angiosperms
- Clade: Eudicots
- Clade: Asterids
- Order: Asterales
- Family: Asteraceae
- Subfamily: Cichorioideae
- Tribe: Cichorieae
- Subtribe: Chondrillinae
- Genus: Chondrilla; L.

Synonyms
- Zollikoferia Nees; Aspideium Zollik. ex DC.

= Chondrilla (plant) =

Genus of asters

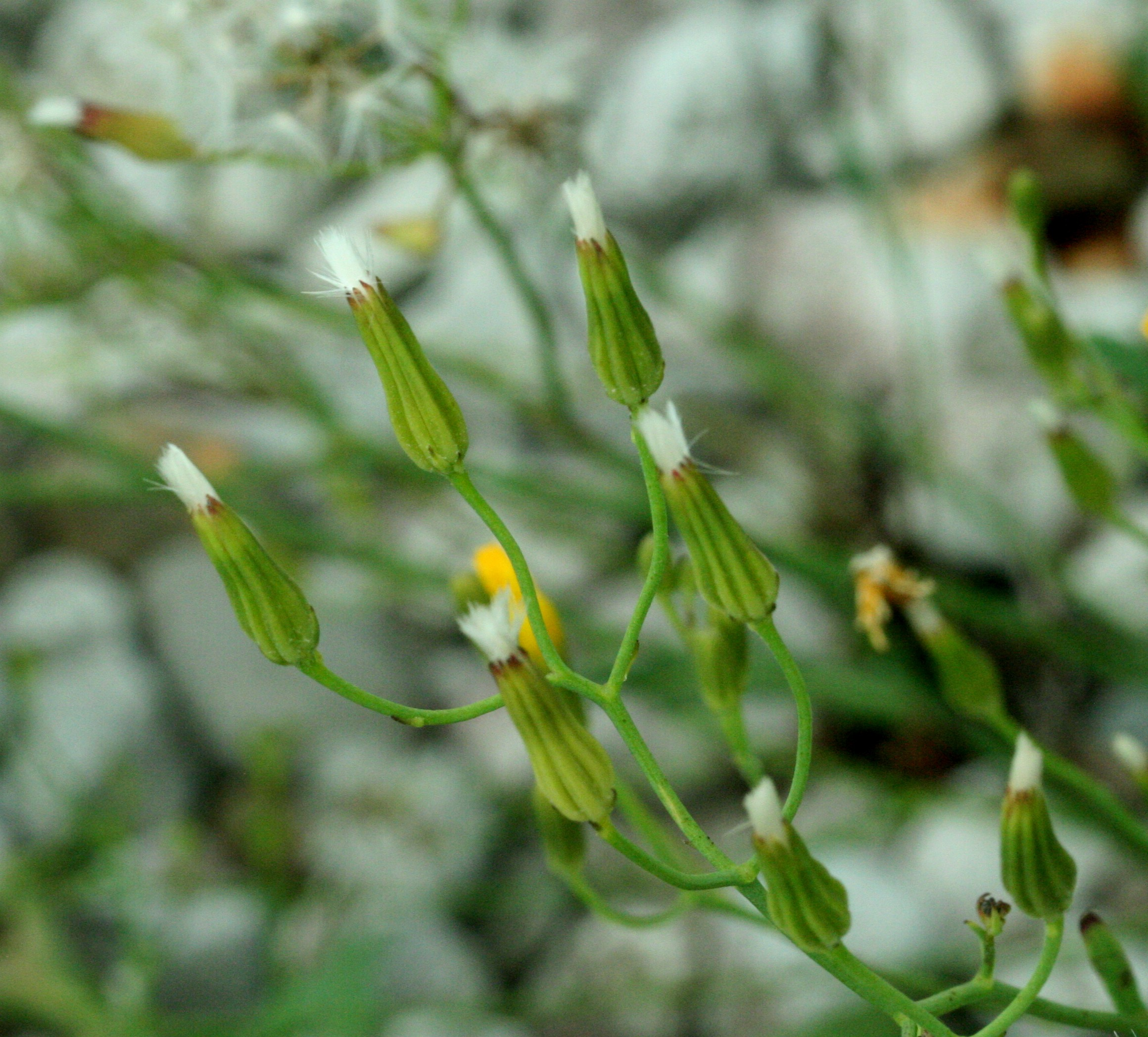
Chondrilla chondrilloides

Chondrilla is a genus of flowering plants in the family Asteraceae. They are native to Eurasia, and certain taxa are known as introduced species outside their native range. The best known of these is rush skeletonweed (Chondrilla juncea), a noxious weed established in Africa, Australia, and the Americas.

Chondrilla species produce one or more stems up to 1.5 meters tall from a taproot which can be very deep and highly branched. The basal and lower stem leaves are divided and toothed, and are borne on winged petioles. The upper leaf blades are smaller and simple. The cylindrical flower heads are often solitary but may grow in clusters, and are located along the branches and at the ends. They contain several yellow florets that soon wither. The fruit is a cylindrical, beaked, ribbed cypsela with a pappus of many white bristles.

This genus is closely related to the dandelions of genus Taraxacum. Plants of both genera undergo apomixis, producing fertile seeds via asexual reproduction.

Confusingly, the name Chondrilla is shared by a genus of Demosponge.

Species

- Chondrilla acantholepis
- Chondrilla ambigua
- Chondrilla aspera
- Chondrilla bosseana
- Chondrilla brevirostris
- Chondrilla canescens
- Chondrilla chondrilloides
- Chondrilla evae
- Chondrilla gibbirostris
- Chondrilla hispida
- Chondrilla juncea – rush skeletonweed, hogbite
- Chondrilla kusnezovii
- Chondrilla laticoronata
- Chondrilla lejosperma
- Chondrilla macra
- Chondrilla macrocarpa
- Chondrilla maracandica
- Chondrilla mariae
- Chondrilla mujunkumensis
- Chondrilla ornata
- Chondrilla pauciflora
- Chondrilla phaeocephala
- Chondrilla piptocoma
- Chondrilla ramosissima
- Chondrilla rouillieri
- Chondrilla setulosa
- Chondrilla spinosa
- Chondrilla tenuiramosa
- Chondrilla yossii
