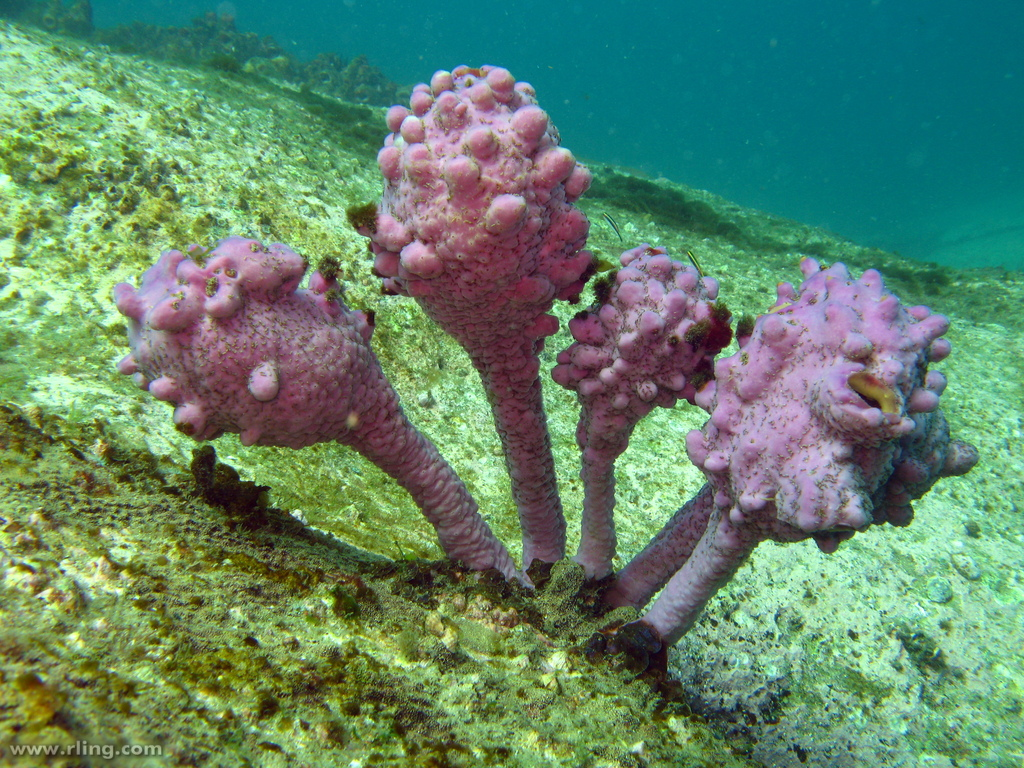

Scientific classification
- Kingdom: Animalia
- Phylum: Porifera
- Class: Demospongiae
- Order: Chondrillida
- Family: Halisarcidae; Schmidt, O. (1862)

Genera
- Halisarca Johnston, 1842

= Halisarcidae =

Family of sponges

Halisarcidae is a family of sea sponges within the order Chondrillida. Members of the family are characterised by having long tubular, branched choanocyte chambers; they have no spicules which makes it difficult to determine the group's affinities with other sponge families. Halisarcidae is a monogeneric family, the only genus being Halisarca.

== See also ==
- Halisarca caerulea
