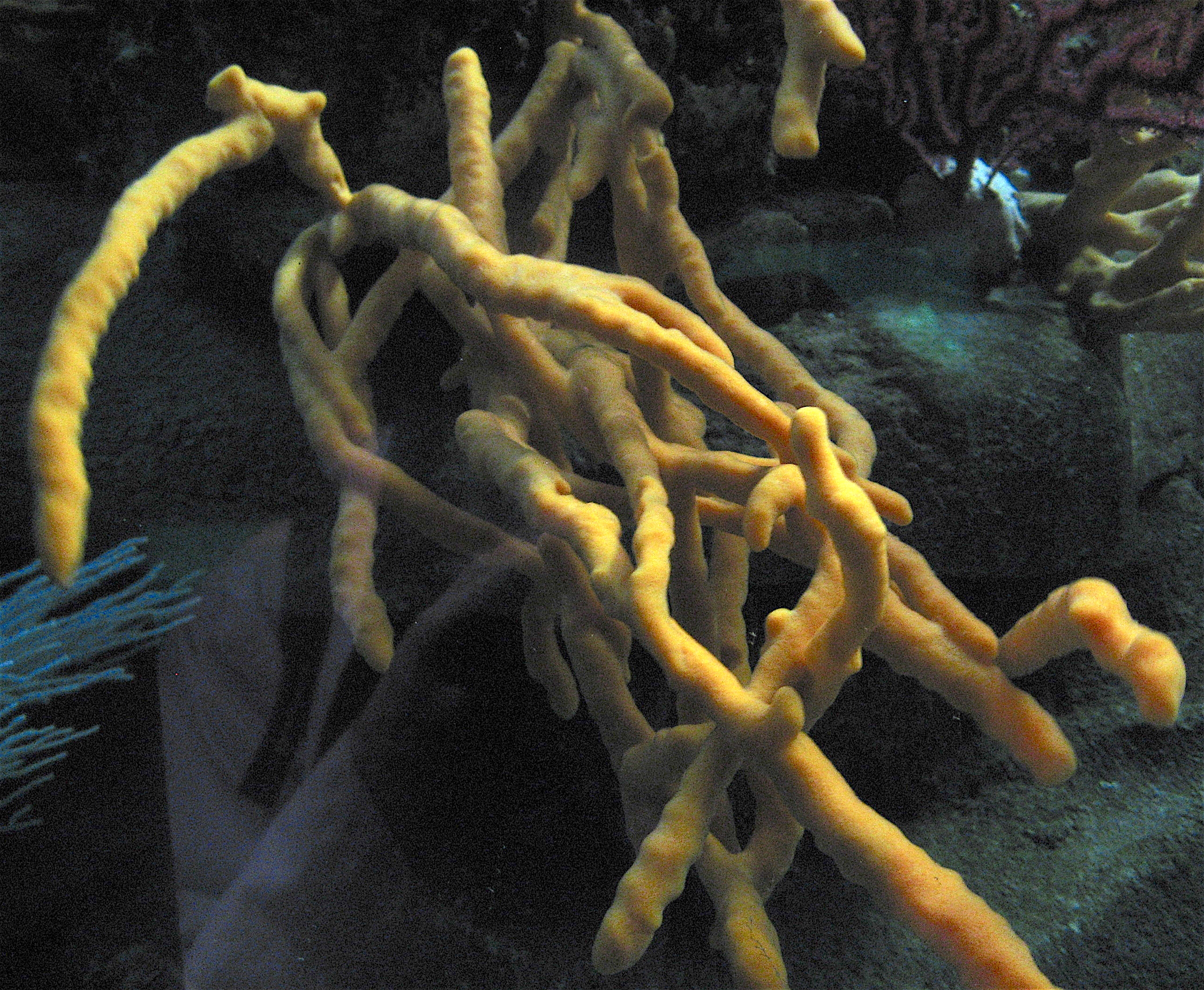
- Axinella polypoides

Scientific classification
- Kingdom: Animalia
- Phylum: Porifera
- Class: Demospongiae
- Subclass: Heteroscleromorpha; Cárdenas, Pérez & Boury-Esnault, 2012

Orders
- Agelasida; Axinellida; Biemnida; Bubarida; Clionaida; Desmacellida; Haplosclerida; Merliida; Poecilosclerida; Polymastiida; Scopalinida; Sphaerocladina; Spongillida; Suberitida; Tethyida; Tetractinellida; Trachycladida; Vilesida; Heteroscleromorpha incertae sedis

Synonyms
- List: Democlavia; Desmacidonitida; Hadromerida; Halichondrida; Haploscleromorpha; Lithistida; Spirastrellida

= Heteroscleromorpha =

Subclass of demosponges

Heteroscleromorpha is a subclass of demosponges within the phylum Porifera.

Heteroscleromorpha has the most taxa of the demosponge subclasses, with an estimated 7500 species.

Its origin can be traced back to the Cambrian period, with the oldest fossil found in Sirius Passet, Greenland. But the true origin of the group may be even older.
