= Ernstilla =

Scientific classification
- Kingdom: Animalia
- Phylum: Porifera
- Class: Demospongiae
- Order: Verongiida
- Family: Ernstillidae; Valecet et al, 2019.
- Genus: Ernstilla; Valecet et al. 2019.
- Species: E. lacunosa

Binomial name
- Ernstilla lacunosa (Hentschel, 1912)

Synonyms
- Dendrilla lacunosa Hentschel, 1912

Genus of sponges

Ernstilla is a genus of sea sponges and is the only genus in the monotypic family Ernstillidae. It is represented by a single species Ernstilla lacunosa.

== Taxonomy ==
The genus emerged from an examination of species then classified as Dendrilla lacunosa by Ernst Hentschel in 1912, describing specimens collected in Indonesia and later discovered at the Kimberley and northwest coast of Australia. The Western Australian researcher Jane Fromont observed that the form of the species, long and whip-like, resembled other classifications and not the small delicate structure of other Dendrilla species. The initial examination required international research to complete, and the result was the identification of a new genus and family, allied to the Verongiida order. The study discovered that while resembling the morphology of the former classification, the skeletal structure of the species was suspected and confirmed to contain chitin.

=== Etymology ===
The new genus and family name are derived from the original author's first name, Ernst.
