= Merliidae =

Scientific classification
- Kingdom: Animalia
- Phylum: Porifera
- Class: Demospongiae
- Order: Merliida
- Family: Merliidae

Family of sponges

Merliidae is a family of sponges belonging to the order Merliida.

Genera:

- Merlia Kirkpatrick, 1908
