= Chondrillidae =

Scientific classification
- Kingdom: Animalia
- Phylum: Porifera
- Class: Demospongiae
- Subclass: Verongimorpha
- Family: Chondrillidae; Gray, 1872

Genera
- Chondrilla; Thymosia; Thymosiopsis

Family of sponges

Chondrillidae is a family of sea sponges within the order Chondrillida.
