= Dictyodendrillidae =

Scientific classification
- Kingdom: Animalia
- Phylum: Porifera
- Class: Demospongiae
- Order: Dendroceratida
- Family: Dictyodendrillidae; Bergquist, 1980

Genera
- Acanthodendrilla; Dictyodendrilla; Igernella; Spongionella

Synonyms
- Pseudobasta Topsent, 1932

Family of sponges

Dictyodendrillidae is a family of sponges in the order Dendroceratida.

== Species ==
- Genus Acanthodendrilla Bergquist, 1995
  - Acanthodendrilla australis Bergquist, 1995
  - Acanthodendrilla levii Uriz & Maldonado, 2000
- Genus DictyodendrillaBergquist, 1980
  - Dictyodendrilla caespitosa (Carter, 1886)
  - Dictyodendrilla cavernosa (Lendenfeld, 1888)
  - Dictyodendrilla dendyi Bergquist, 1996
  - Dictyodendrilla digitata (Lendenfeld, 1888)
  - Dictyodendrilla massa (Carter, 1886)
  - Dictyodendrilla nux (de Laubenfels, 1950)
  - Dictyodendrilla pallasi (Ridley, 1884)
  - Dictyodendrilla tenella (Lendenfeld, 1888)
- Genus Igernella Topsent, 1905
  - Igernella mirabilis Lévi, 1961
  - Igernella notabilis (Duchassaing & Michelotti 1864)
  - Igernella vansoesti Uriz & Maldonado, 1996
- Genus Spongionella Bowerbank, 1862
  - Spongionella depressa Topsent, 1929
  - Spongionella foliascens Kelly-Borges, Pomponi & Vacelet, 1993
  - Spongionella gracilis (Vosmaer, 1883)
  - Spongionella monoprocta Lévi, 1961
  - Spongionella nigra Dendy, 1889
  - Spongionella pulchella (Sowerby, 1804)
  - Spongionella pulvilla (Dendy, 1905)
  - Spongionella ramodigitata (Topsent, 1901)
  - Spongionella regularis (Ridley, 1881)
  - Spongionella repens (Thiele, 1905)
  - Spongionella retiara (Dendy, 1916)
  - Spongionella tubulosa Burton, 1937
