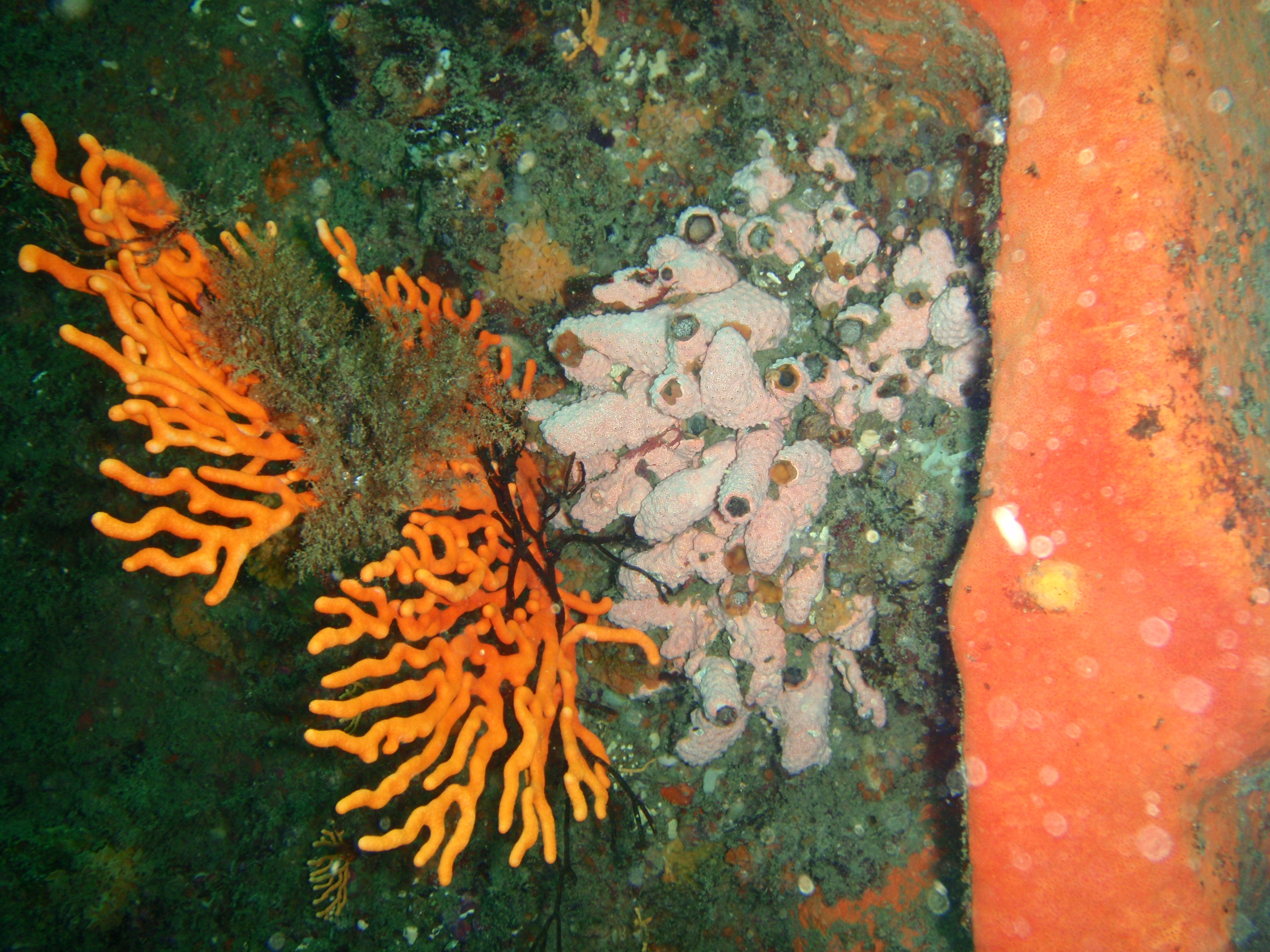

Scientific classification
- Kingdom: Animalia
- Phylum: Porifera
- Class: Demospongiae
- Order: Trachycladida
- Family: Trachycladidae
- Genus: Trachycladus; Carter, 1879

Species
- See text

Synonyms
- Spirophora Lendenfeld, 1887; Spirophorella Lendenfeld, 1888

= Trachycladus =

Genus of sponges

Trachycladus is a genus of sea sponge belonging to the family Trachycladidae.

== Species ==
Species in this genus include:

- Trachycladus cervicornis Burton, 1959
- Trachycladus laevispirulifer Carter, 1879
- Trachycladus minax (Topsent, 1888)
- Trachycladus spinispirulifer (Carter, 1879)
- Trachycladus stylifer Dendy, 1924
- Trachycladus tethyoides Burton, 1959
