= Vetulinidae =

Scientific classification
- Kingdom: Animalia
- Phylum: Porifera
- Class: Demospongiae
- Order: Sphaerocladina
- Family: Vetulinidae; Lendenfeld, 1903

Family of sponges

Vetulinidae is a family of sponges belonging to the order Sphaerocladina.

Genera:

- Macrobrochus Schrammen, 1910
- Ozotrachelus de Laubenfels, 1955
- Vetulina Schmidt, 1879
