= Hamacanthidae =

Scientific classification
- Domain: Eukaryota
- Kingdom: Animalia
- Phylum: Porifera
- Class: Demospongiae
- Order: Merliida
- Family: Hamacanthidae

Family of sponges

Hamacanthidae is a family of sponges belonging to the order Merliida.

Genera:

- Hamacantha Gray, 1867
- Pozziella Topsent, 1896
- Zygherpe de Laubenfels, 1932
