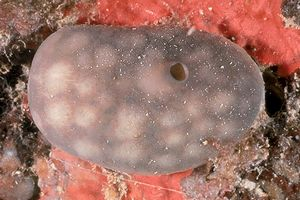
- Chondrosia reniformis

Scientific classification
- Kingdom: Animalia
- Phylum: Porifera
- Class: Demospongiae
- Subclass: Verongimorpha
- Order: Chondrosiida; Boury-Esnault & Lopes, 1985

Families
- Chondrosiidae

Synonyms
- Chondrosida

= Chondrosiida =

Order of sponges

Chondrosiida is an order of sea sponges within the subclass Verongimorpha. Chondrosia reniformis is a unique marine sponge known as the kidney sponge due to its shape and texture. It is primarily found in the Mediterranean Sea and the eastern Atlantic Ocean, typically inhabiting shallow coastal waters.
