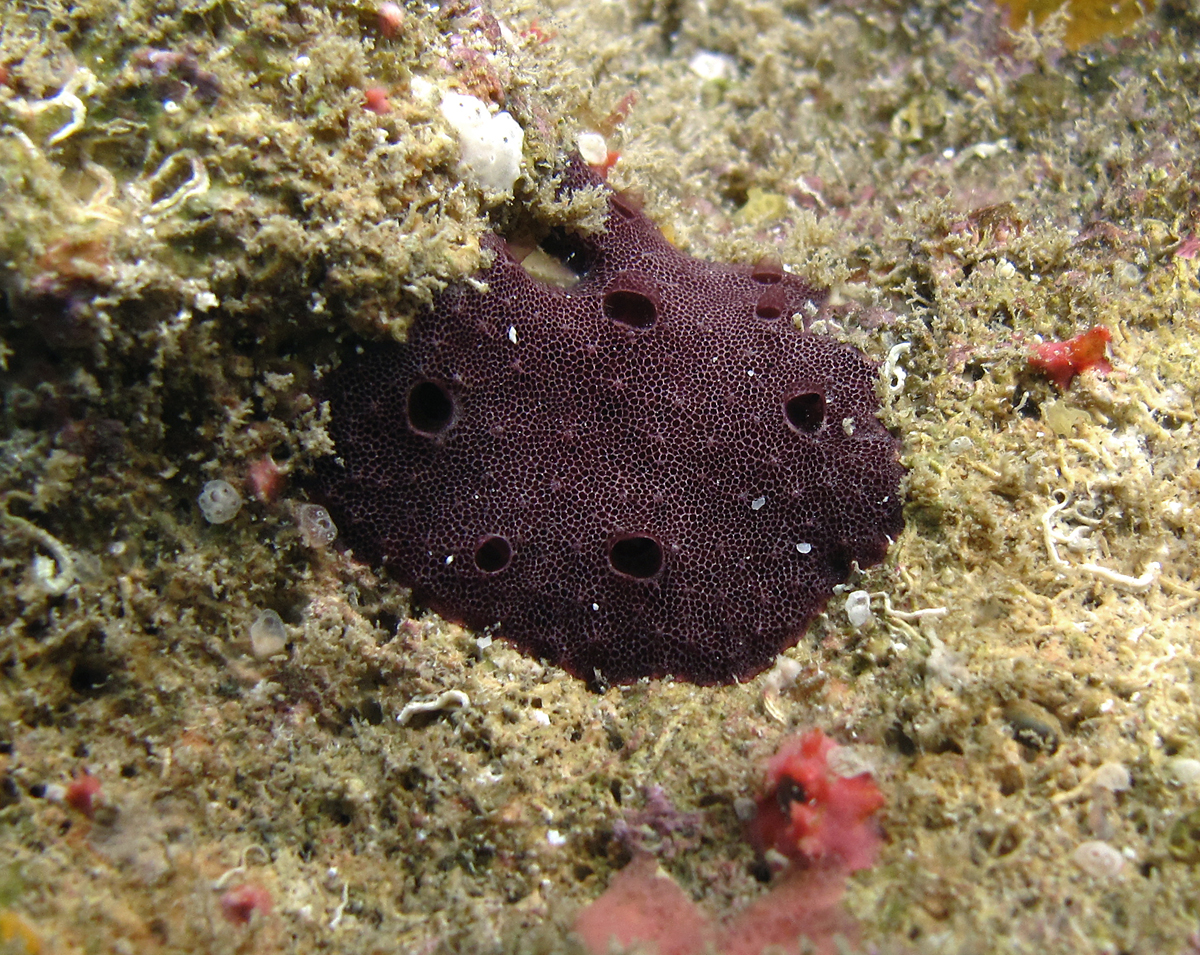

Scientific classification
- Kingdom: Animalia
- Phylum: Porifera
- Class: Demospongiae
- Order: Dendroceratida
- Family: Darwinellidae
- Genus: Chelonaplysilla
- Species: C. violacea

Binomial name
- Chelonaplysilla violacea Lendenfeld, 1883

Synonyms
- Aplysilla violacea Lendenfeld, 1883

= Chelonaplysilla violacea =

Species of sponge

Chelonaplysilla violacea is a species of sponge found mainly in New Zealand, but have been reported on both sides of the Pacific Ocean, including areas such as the Indo-Pacific, the United Arab Emirates, the Persian Gulf, Australia, and Hawaii. The color of the species is a reddish-mauve, their surface is opaque, membranous, and optically smooth, and their texture is slimy, soft, and compressible, with horny fibers protruding.
