= Vetulina =

Scientific classification
- Kingdom: Animalia
- Phylum: Porifera
- Class: Demospongiae
- Order: Sphaerocladina; Schrammen, 1924
- Family: Vetulinidae; Lendenfeld, 1903
- Genus: Vetulina; Schmidt, 1879

Species
- See text

Genus of sponges

Vetulina is a genus of sea sponges in the subclass Heteroscleromorpha. It is the only genus in the monotypic family Vetulinidae and the monotypic order Sphaerocladina.

== Species ==
There are three species recognised within the genus:

- Vetulina indica Pisera, Łukowiak, Fromont & Schuster, 2017
- Vetulina rugosa Pisera, Łukowiak, Fromont & Schuster, 2017
- Vetulina stalactites Schmidt, 1879
