= Chondrilla ambigua =

Scientific classification
- Kingdom: Plantae
- Clade: Tracheophytes
- Clade: Angiosperms
- Clade: Eudicots
- Clade: Asterids
- Order: Asterales
- Family: Asteraceae
- Genus: Chondrilla
- Species: C. ambigua

Binomial name
- Chondrilla ambigua Fisch.

Species of perennial

Chondrilla ambigua is a species of perennial plant endemic to Kazakhstan, Russia, Turkmenistan, China, and Uzbekistan. It thrives in sand dunes and gravel.

Chondrilla ambigua typically grows to a height of 40–100 cm. The species has a broomlike appearance with narrowly linear leaves and is sometimes woody.
