= Darwinella (sponge) =

Scientific classification
- Domain: Eukaryota
- Kingdom: Animalia
- Phylum: Porifera
- Class: Demospongiae
- Order: Dendroceratida
- Family: Darwinellidae
- Genus: Darwinella; Müller, 1865

Genus of sponges

Darwinella is a genus of sponges belonging to the family Darwinellidae.

The species of this genus are found mostly in the Southern Hemisphere.

Species:

- Darwinella australiensis Carter, 1885
- Darwinella corneostellata (Carter, 1872)
- Darwinella dalmatica Topsent, 1905
- Darwinella duplex Topsent, 1905
- Darwinella gardineri Topsent, 1905
- Darwinella intermedia Topsent, 1893
- Darwinella muelleri (Schultze, 1865)
- Darwinella notabilis
- Darwinella oxeata Bergquist, 1961
- Darwinella pronzatoi Bertolino, Costa & Pansini, 2020
- Darwinella rosacea Hechtel, 1965
- Darwinella simplex Topsent, 1892
- Darwinella tango (Poiner & Taylor, 1990)
- Darwinella viscosa Boury-Esnault, 1971
- Darwinella warreni Topsent, 1905
