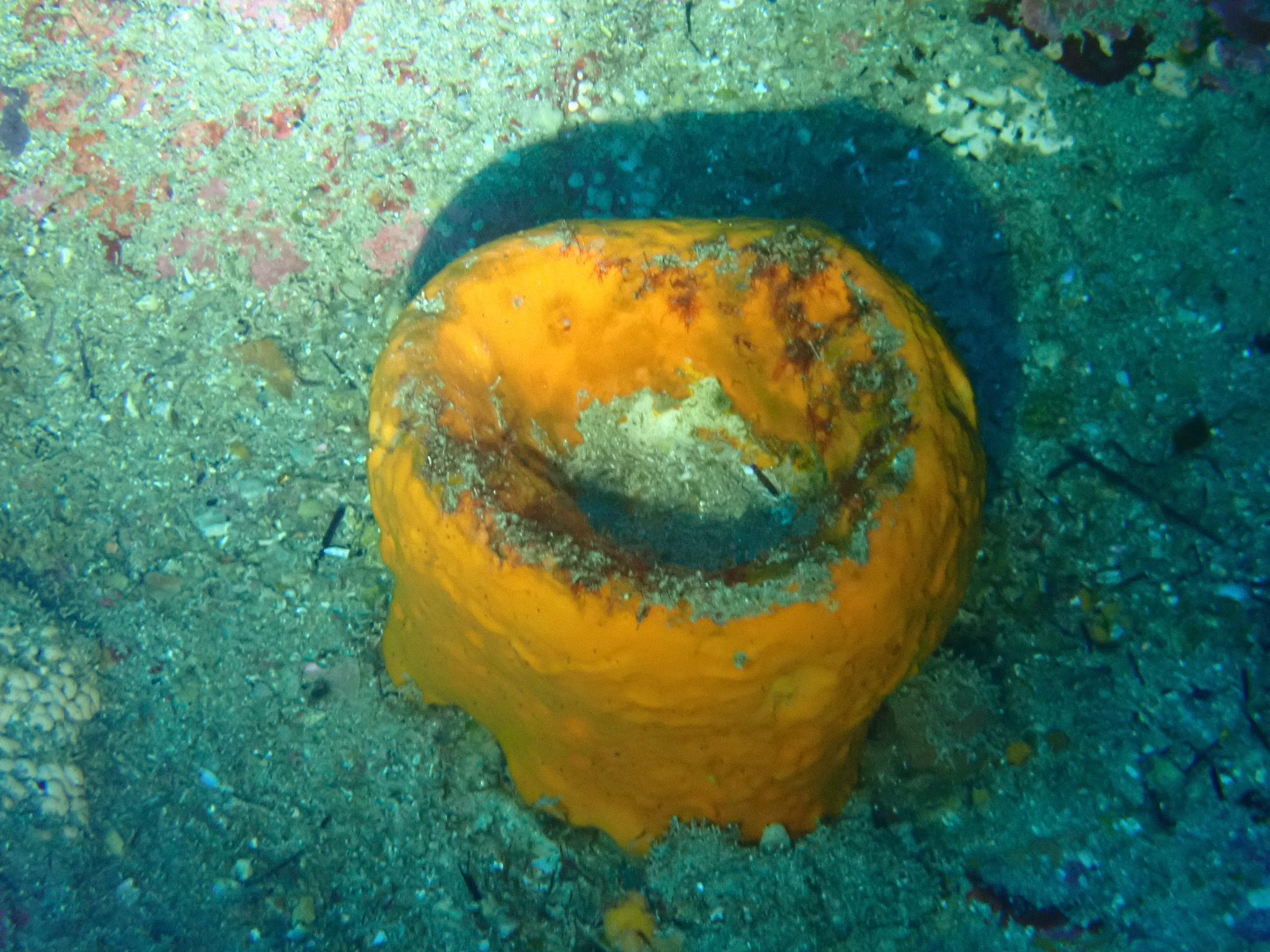
- Desmacella dendyi

Scientific classification
- Kingdom: Animalia
- Phylum: Porifera
- Class: Demospongiae
- Order: Desmacellida; Morrow & Cárdenas, 2015
- Family: Desmacellidae; Ridley & Dendy, 1886

Genera
- see text

= Desmacellidae =

Family of sponges

Desmacellidae is a family of marine demosponges. It is the only family in the monotypic order Desmacellida.

== Genera ==
The following genera are recognized in the family Desmacellidae:

- Desmacella Schmidt, 1870
- Dragmatella Hallmann, 1917
- Microtylostylifer Dendy, 1924
- Tylosigma Topsent, 1894
