= Trachycladidae =

Scientific classification
- Kingdom: Animalia
- Phylum: Porifera
- Class: Demospongiae
- Subclass: Heteroscleromorpha
- Order: Trachycladida; Morrow & Cárdenas, 2015
- Family: Trachycladidae; Hallmann, 1917

Family of sponges

Trachycladidae is a family of sea sponges in the subclass Heteroscleromorpha. It is the only family in the monotypic order Trachycladida.

== Genera ==
- Rhaphidhistia Carter, 1879
- Trachycladus Carter, 1879
