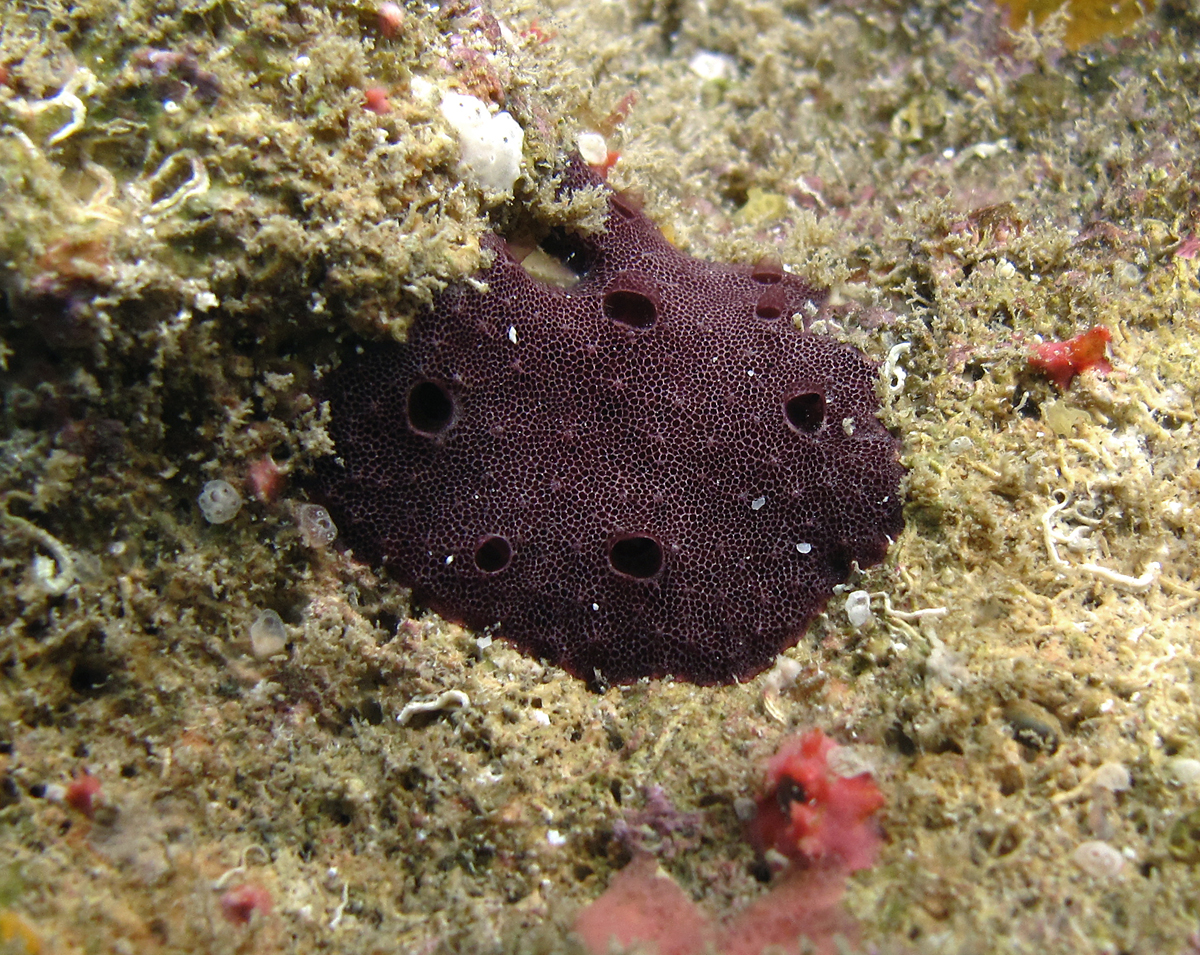
- Chelonaplysilla violacea off Réunion

Scientific classification
- Domain: Eukaryota
- Kingdom: Animalia
- Phylum: Porifera
- Class: Demospongiae
- Order: Dendroceratida
- Family: Darwinellidae

Genera
- Aplysilla; Chelonaplysilla; Darwinella; Dendrilla

= Darwinellidae =

Family of sponges

Darwinellidae is a family of sponges in the order Dendroceratida.

== Species ==
- Genus Aplysilla Schulze, 1878
  - Aplysilla arctica Laubenfels, 1948
  - Aplysilla glacialis (Merejkowski, 1877)
  - Aplysilla lacunosa Keller, 1889
  - Aplysilla lendenfeldi Thiele, 1905
  - Aplysilla longispina George & Wilson, 1919
  - Aplysilla pallida Lendenfeld, 1889
  - Aplysilla polyraphis de Laubenfels, 1930
  - Aplysilla rosea (Barrois, 1876)
  - Aplysilla rubra (Hanitsch, 1890)
  - Aplysilla sulfurea Schulze, 1878
- Genus Armodendrilla Van Soest & Hooper, 2020
  - Armodendrilla bergquistae Van Soest & Hooper, 2020
- Genus Chelonaplysilla Laubenfels, 1948
  - Chelonaplysilla americana van Soest, 2017
  - Chelonaplysilla arenosa (Topsent, 1925)
  - Chelonaplysilla aurea Bergquist, 1995
  - Chelonaplysilla betinensis Zea & van Soest, 1986
  - Chelonaplysilla delicata Pulitzer-Finali & Pronzato, 1999
  - Chelonaplysilla erecta (Row 1911)
  - Chelonaplysilla incrustans (Carter, 1876)
  - Chelonaplysilla noevus (Carter, 1876)
  - Chelonaplysilla psammophila (Topsent, 1928)
  - Chelonaplysilla supjiensis Jeon & Sim, 2008
  - Chelonaplysilla violacea (Lendenfeld 1883)
- Genus Darwinella Müller, 1865
  - Darwinella australiensis Carter, 1885
  - Darwinella corneostellata (Carter, 1872)
  - Darwinella dalmatica Topsent, 1905
  - Darwinella duplex Topsent, 1905
  - Darwinella gardineri Topsent 1905
  - Darwinella intermedia Topsent, 1893
  - Darwinella muelleri (Schultze, 1865)
  - Darwinella oxeata Bergquist 1961
  - Darwinella rosacea Hechtel, 1965
  - Darwinella simplex Topsent, 1892
  - Darwinella tango (Poiner & Taylor, 1990)
  - Darwinella viscosa Boury-Esnault, 1971
  - Darwinella warreni Topsent, 1905
- Genus Dendrilla Lendenfeld, 1883
  - Dendrilla acantha Vacelet, 1958
  - Dendrilla antarctica Topsent, 1905
  - Dendrilla cactos (Selenka, 1867)
  - Dendrilla camera (de Laubenfels, 1936)
  - Dendrilla cirsioides Topsent, 1893
  - Dendrilla cruor (Carter, 1886)
  - Dendrilla lendenfeldi Hentschel, 1912
  - Dendrilla membranosa (Pallas, 1766)
  - Dendrilla mertoni Hentschel, 1912
  - Dendrilla rosea Lendenfeld, 1883
