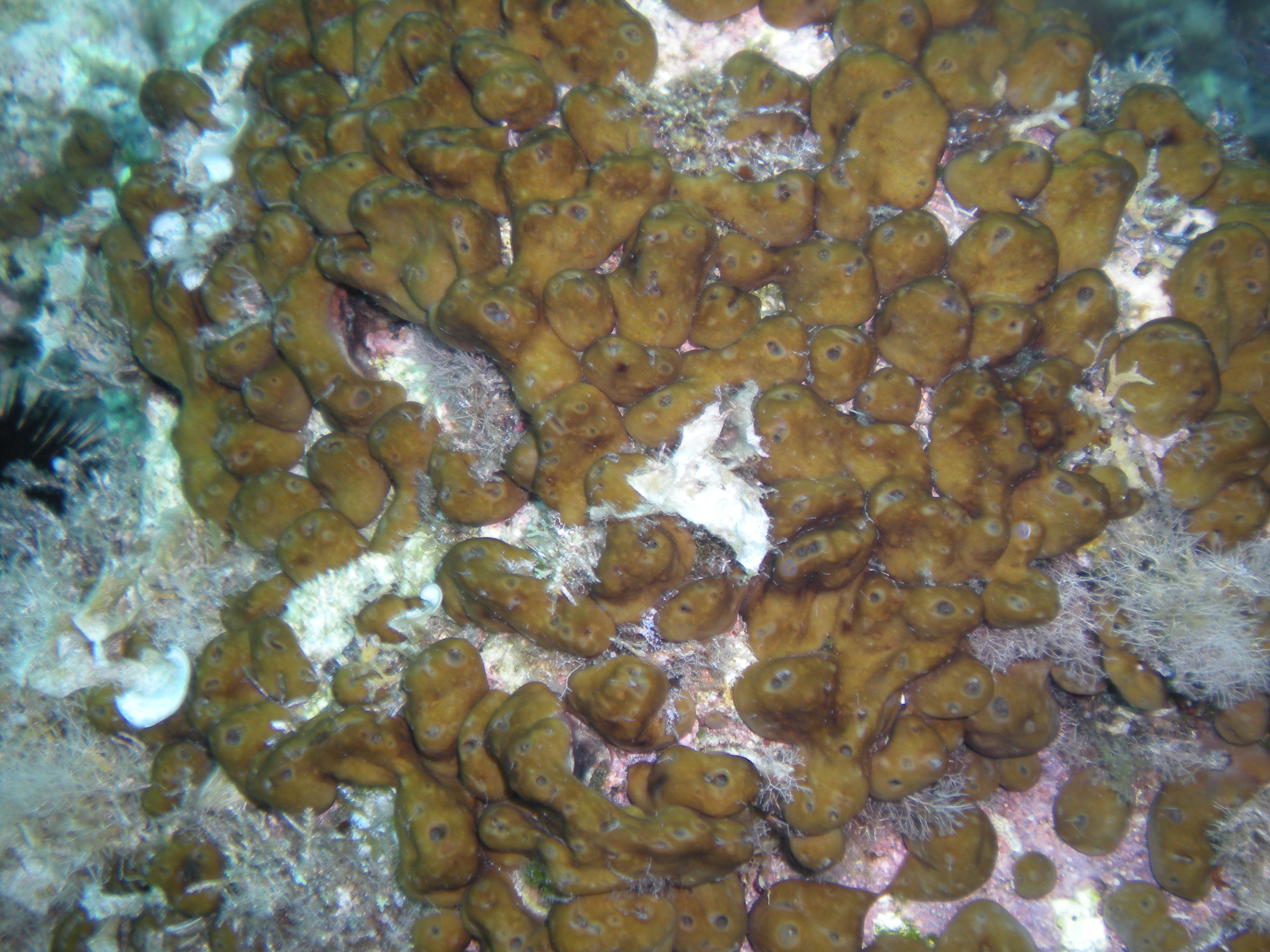
- Chondrilla nucula

Scientific classification
- Domain: Eukaryota
- Kingdom: Animalia
- Phylum: Porifera
- Class: Demospongiae
- Family: Chondrillidae
- Genus: Chondrilla; Schmidt, 1862

Synonyms
- List: Chondrillastra Topsent, 1918; Magog Sollas, 1888

= Chondrilla (sponge) =

Genus of sponges

Chondrilla is a genus of sea sponges belonging to the family Chondrillidae.

== Species ==
- Chondrilla acanthastra de Laubenfels, 1954
- Chondrilla australiensis Carter, 1873
- Chondrilla caribensis Rüztler, Duran & Piantoni, 2007
- Chondrilla euastra de Laubenfels, 1949
- Chondrilla grandistellata Thiele, 1899
- Chondrilla jinensis Hentschel, 1912
- Chondrilla kilakaria Kumar, 1925
- Chondrilla linnaei Fromont, Usher, Sutton, Toze & Kuo 2008
- Chondrilla mixta Schulze, 1877
- Chondrilla montanusa Carballo, Gomez, Cruz-Barraza & Flores-Sanchez, 2003
- Chondrilla nucula Schmidt, 1862
- Chondrilla oxyastera Tanita & Hoshino, 1989
- Chondrilla pacifica Carballo, Gomez, Cruz-Barraza & Flores-Sanchez, 2003
- Chondrilla sacciformis Carter, 1879
- Chondrilla secunda Lendenfeld, 1885
- Chondrilla verrucosa Desqueyroux-Faúndez & van Soest, 1997
