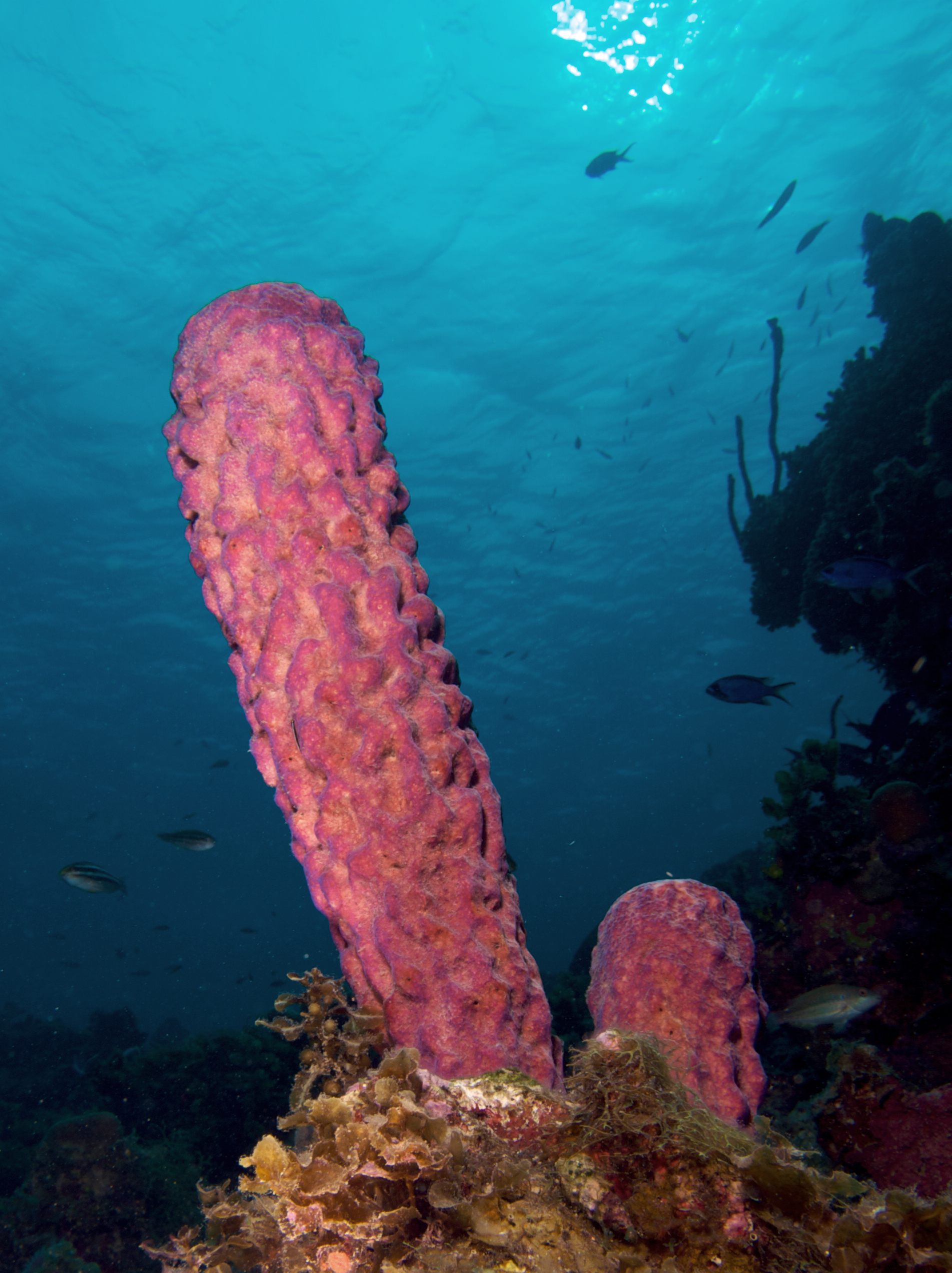
- Aplysina archeri

Scientific classification
- Domain: Eukaryota
- Kingdom: Animalia
- Phylum: Porifera
- Class: Demospongiae
- Subclass: Verongimorpha; Erpenbeck, Sutcliffe, De Cook, Dietzel, Maldonado, van Soest, Hooper & Wörheide, 2012

Orders
- Chondrillida; Chondrosiida; Verongiida

Synonyms
- Myxospongiae Haeckel, 1866

= Verongimorpha =

Subclass of sponges

Verongimorpha is the name of a subclass of sea sponges within the phylum Porifera. It was first authenticated and described by Erpenbeck et al. in 2012.
