= Merliida =

Scientific classification
- Domain: Eukaryota
- Kingdom: Animalia
- Phylum: Porifera
- Class: Demospongiae
- Subclass: Heteroscleromorpha
- Order: Merliida; Vacelet, 1979

Families
- Hamacanthidae Gray, 1872; Merliidae Kirkpatrick, 1908

Order of sponges

Merliida is an order of demosponges in the subclass Heteroscleromorpha, first described as such by Jean Vacelet in 1979.
