= Chondrillida =

Scientific classification
- Kingdom: Animalia
- Phylum: Porifera
- Class: Demospongiae
- Subclass: Verongimorpha
- Order: Chondrillida; Redmond, Morrow, Thacker, Diaz, Boury-Esnault, Cárdenas, Hajdu, Lobo-Hajdu, Picton, Pomponi, Kayal & Collins, 2013

Families
- Chondrillidae; Halisarcidae

Synonyms
- Halisarcida

Order of sponges

Chondrillida is an order of sea sponges within the subclass Verongimorpha.
