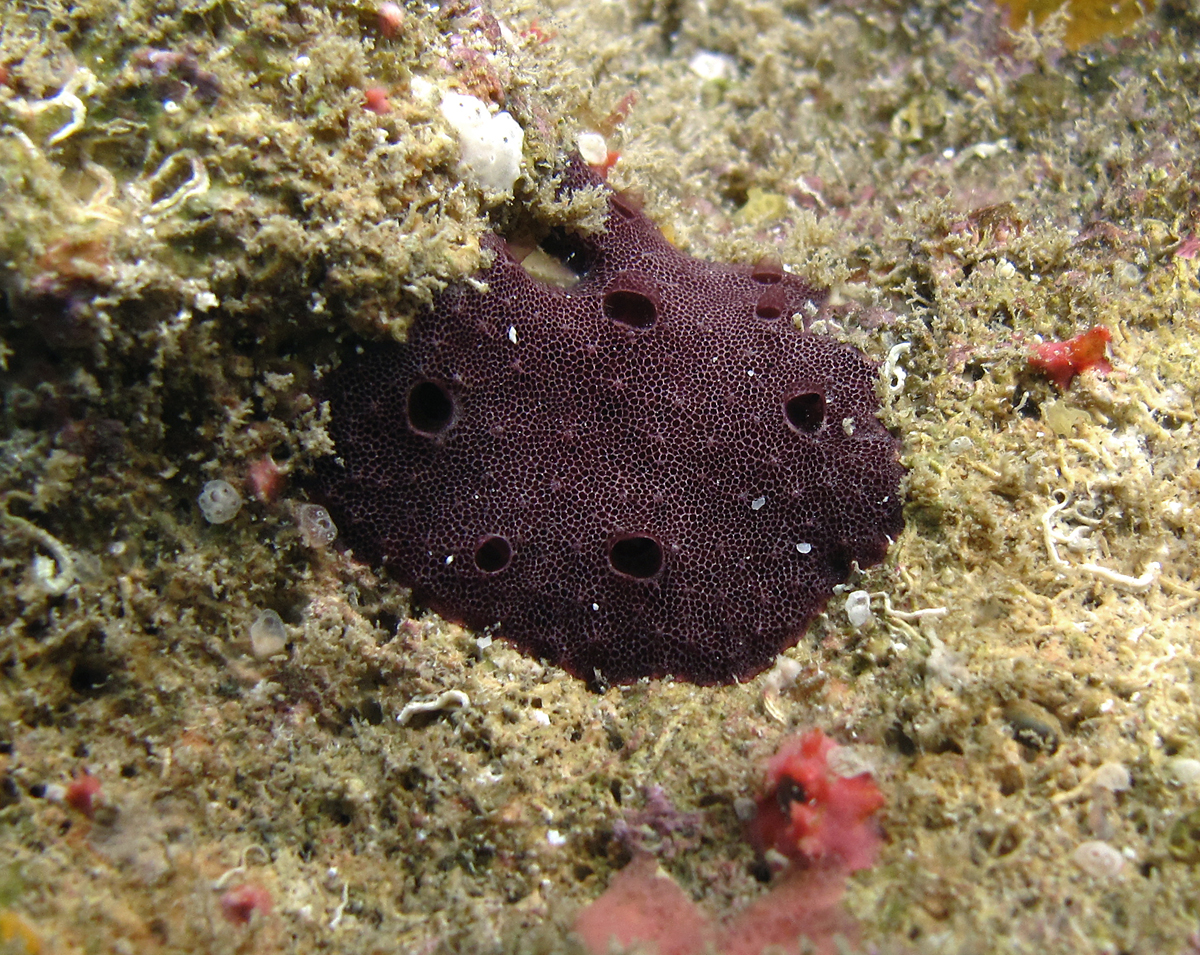
- Chelonaplysilla violacea off Réunion

Scientific classification
- Domain: Eukaryota
- Kingdom: Animalia
- Phylum: Porifera
- Class: Demospongiae
- Subclass: Keratosa
- Order: Dendroceratida; Minchin, 1900

Families
- Darwinellidae Merejkowsky, 1879; Dictyodendrillidae Bergquist, 1980

= Dendroceratida =

Order of sponges

Dendroceratida is an order of sponges of the class Demospongiae. They are typically found in shallow coastal and tidal areas of most coasts around the world. They are generally characterized by concentric layers of fibers containing spongin (a collagen-like material), and by large flagellated chambers that open directly into the exhalant canals. Along with the Dictyoceratida, it is one of the two orders of demosponges that make up the keratose or "horny" sponges, in which a mineral skeleton is minimal or absent and a skeleton of organic spongin-containing fibers is present instead.
