= List of sponges of Venezuela =

The sponges of Venezuela are a part of the Porifera fauna of Venezuela (which is part of the wildlife of Venezuela).

A number of species of sponges are found in the wild in Venezuela.

This is a partial list of the marine and freshwater sponges of Venezuela. The families are listed alphabetically within the classes.

== Statistics ==
Environment	Nº of Families	Nº of Genera	Nº of Species
Marine species	39	54	100
Freshwater species	3	10	17
Total	42	64	117

== Marine sponges ==
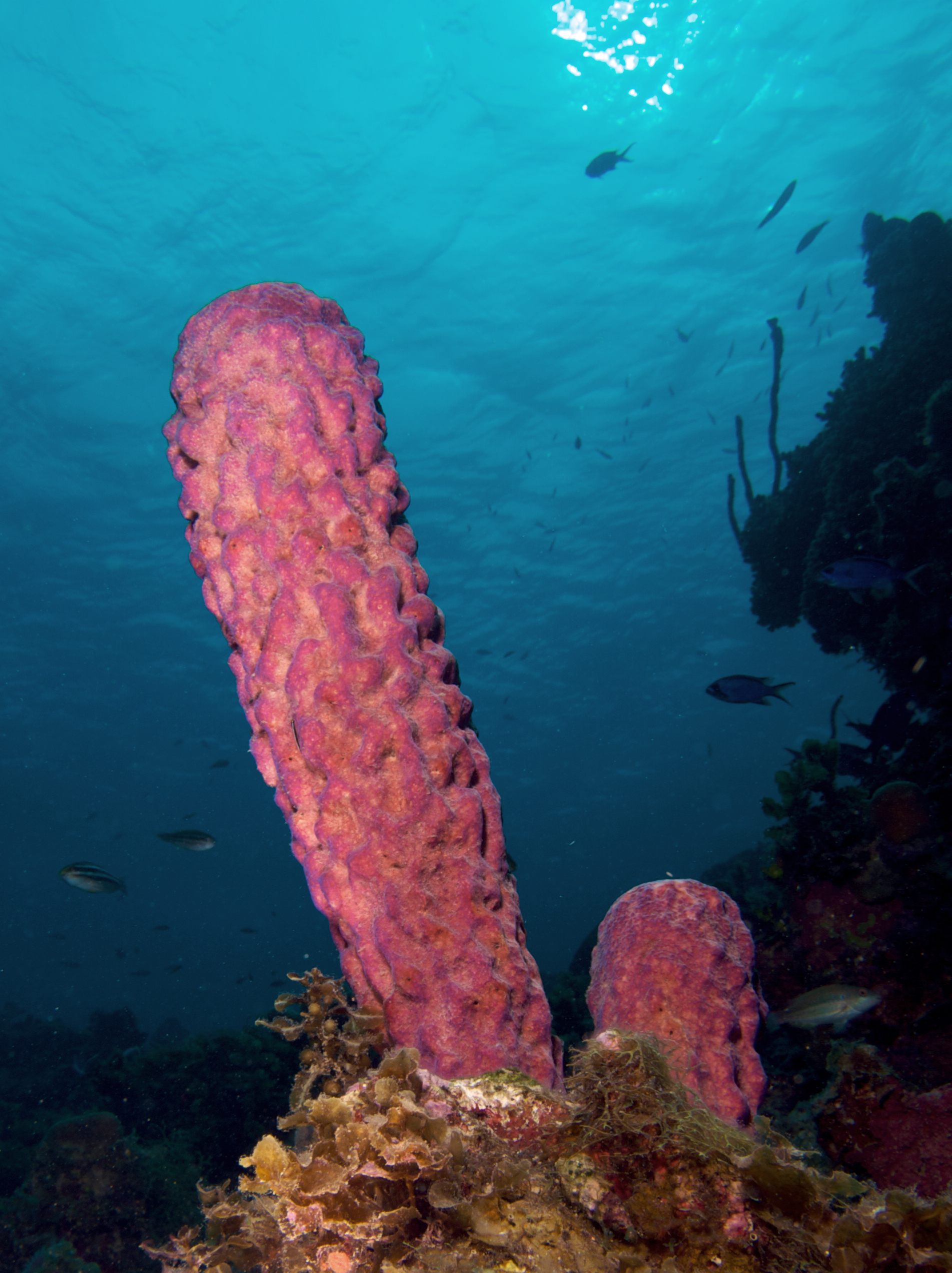
A live individual of Aplysina archeri

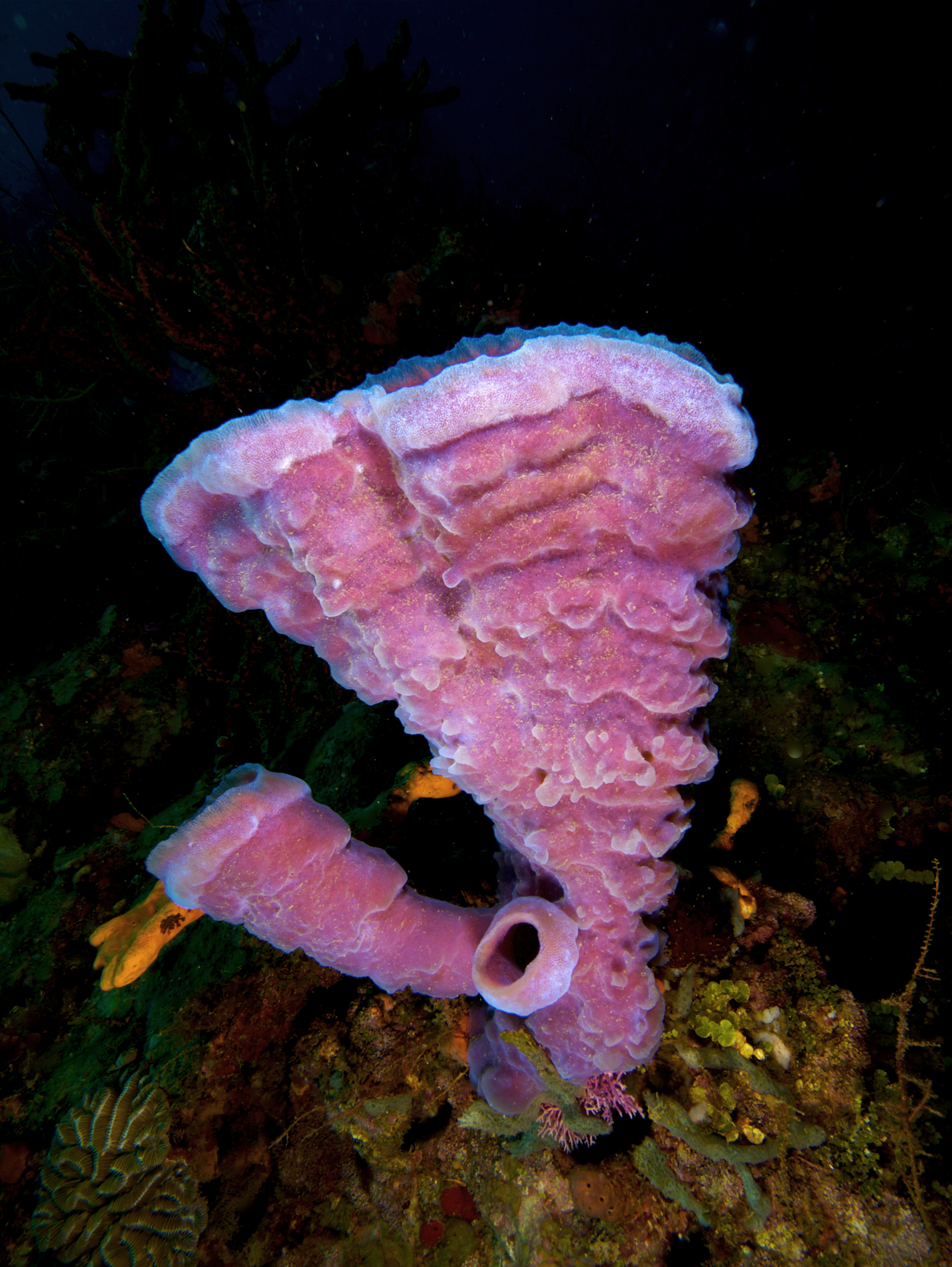
A live individual of Callyspongia vaginalis

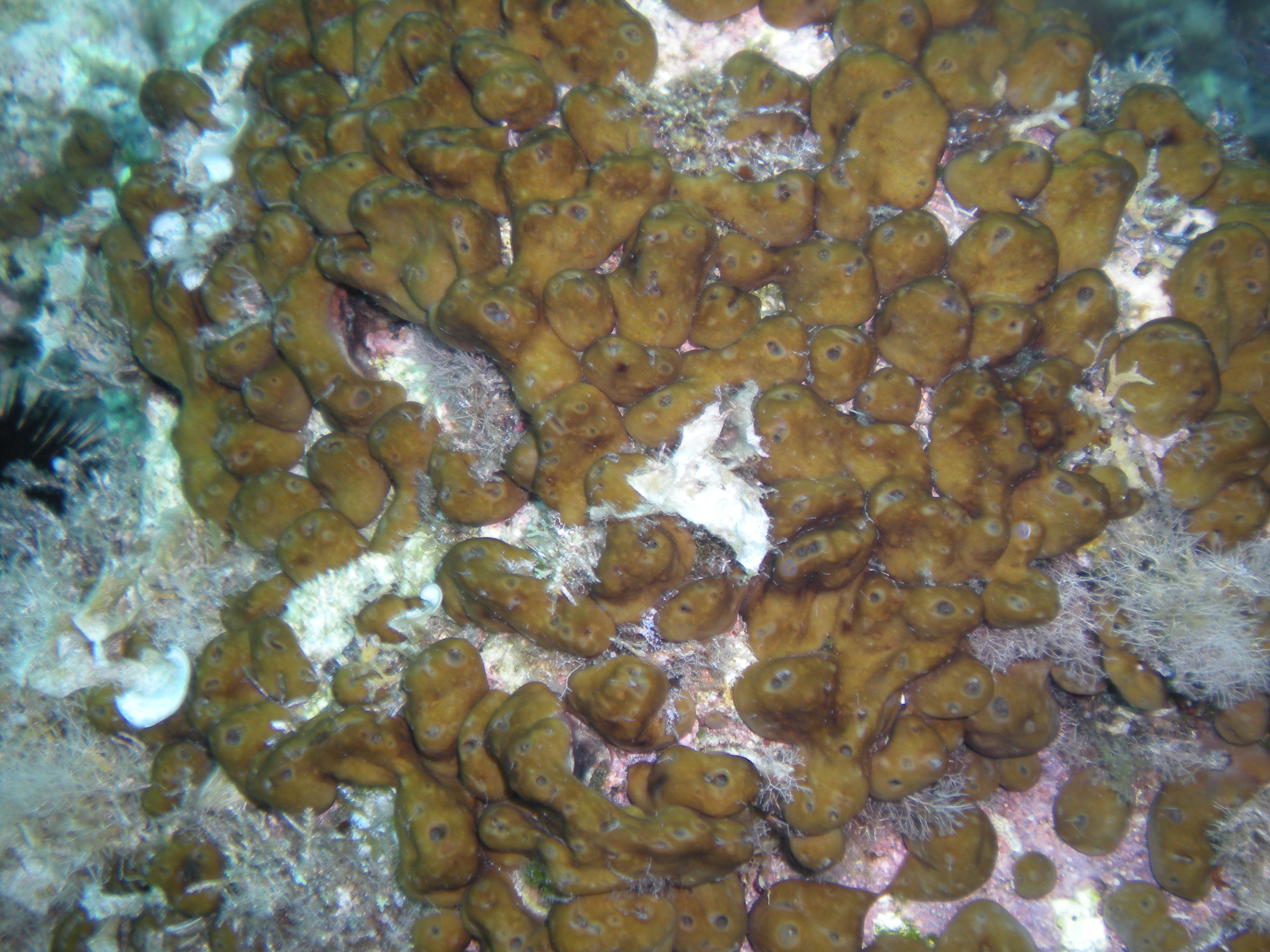
A live individual of Chondrilla nucula

Family Acarnidae

- Acarnus

Family Adociidae

- Sigmadocia caerulea Hechtel 1965

Family Aplysinidae

- Aplysina archeri (Higgin, 1875)
- Aplysina caissara Pinheiro & Hajdu, 2001
- Aplysina cauliformis (Carter, 1882)
- Aplysina fistularis (Pallas, 1766)
- Aplysina fulva (Pallas, 1766)
- Aplysina lacunosa (Lamarck, 1814)

Family Callyspongiidae

- Callyspongia arcesiosa Laubenfels, 1936
- Callyspongia vaginalis (Lamarck, 1814)

Family Chalinidae

- Chalinula molitba (Laubenfels, 1949)

Family Chondrillidae

- Chondrilla caribensis Rützler, Duran & Piantoni, 2007
- Chondrilla nucula Smithdt 1862

Family Clionidae

- Cliona raphida Boury-Esnault, 1973
- Cliona varians (Duchassaing & Michelotti, 1864)

Family Coelosphaeridae

- Lissodendoryx

Family Crambeidae

- Monanchora arbuscula (Duchassaing & Michelotti, 1864)

Family Darwinellidae

- Aplysilla glacialis (Merejkowski, 1878)
- Chelonaplysilla erecta Tsurnamal, 1967
- Darwinella rosacea Hechtel, 1965

Family Desmacididae

- Desmapsamma anchorata (Carter, 1882)

Family Desmacidonidae

- Liosina monticulosa (Verrill, 1907)

Family Dysidea

- Dysidea etheria Laubenfels, 1936

Family Dictyonellidae

- Scopalina ruetzleri (Wiedenmayer, 1977)

Family Dysideidae

- Dysidea etheria Laubenfels, 1936

Family Geodiidae

- Geodia gibberosa Lamarck, 1815
- Geodia papyracea Hechtel, 1965

Family Grantiidae

- Leucandra aspera (Schmidt, 1862)

Family Halichondriidae

- Anthosigmella varians (Duchassaing & Michelotti, 1864)
- Halichondria magniculosa Hechtel
- Halichondria melanadocia Laubenfels, 1936
- Topsentia ophiraphidites (Laubenfels, 1934)

Family Halicloniidae

- Haliclona caerulea (Hechtel, 1965)
- Haliclona crassiloba Laubenfels, 1950
- Haliclona curacaoensis (van Soest, 1980)
- Haliclona doria Laubenfels, 1936
- Haliclona implexiformis (Hechtel, 1965)
- Haliclona magnifica de Weerdt, Rützler & Smith, 1991
- Haliclona manglaris Alcolado, 1984
- Haliclona permollis (Bowerbank, 1866)
- Haliclona picadaerensis
- Haliclona tubifera (George & Wilson, 1919)
- Haliclona twincayensis de Weerdt, Rützler & Smith, 1991
- Haliclona viridis (Keller, 1889)
- Niphastes variabilis Duchassaing & Michelotti, 1864

Family Halisarcidae

- Halisarca

Family Heteroxyidae

- Myrmekioderma rea (de Laubenfels, 1934)

Family Hymedesmiidae

- Phorbas amaranthus Duchassaing & Michelotti, 1864

Family Iotrochotidae

- Iotrochota birotulata (Higgin, 1877)

Family Irciniidae

- Irsinia fasciculata (Pallas, 1766)
- Ircinia felix (Duchassaing & Michelotti, 1864)
- Irsinia strobilina (Lamarck, 1816)

Family Microcionidae

- Artemisina melana van Soest, 1984
- Clathria ferrea (de Laubenfels, 1936)
- Clathria venosa Hooper, 1996
- Clathria microchela (Stephens, 1916)
- Clathria schoenus (Laubenfels, 1936)
- Clathria venosa (Alcolado, 1984)
- Microciona
- Pandaros acanthifolium Duchassaing & Michelotti, 1864

Family Mycalidae

- Ulosa hispida Hechtel, 1965
- Mycale americana van Soest, 1984
- Mycale angulosa (Duchassaing & Michelotti, 1864)
- Mycale carmigropila Hajdu & Rützler, 1998
- Mycale citrina Hajdu & Rützler, 1998
- Mycale laxissima (Duchassaing & Michelotti, 1864)
- Mycale magnirhaphidifera van Soest, 1984
- Mycale microsigmatosa Arndt, 1927

Family Niphatidae

- Amphimedon compressa Duchassaing & Michelotti, 1864
- Amphimedon viridis Duchassaing & Michelotti, 1864
- Gelliodes ramosa Kieschnick, 1898
- Neopetrosia subtriangularis (Duchassaing, 1850)
- Niphates erecta Duchassaing & Michelotti, 1864

Family Ophlitaspongiidae

- Biemna caribea Pulitzer-Finali, 1986
- Biemna microstyla Laubenfels, 1950
- Desmacella jania Verrill, 1907
- Desmacella meliorata Wiedenmayer, 1977

Family Petrosiidae

- Neopetrosia subtriangularis (Duchassaing, 1850)

Family Phloeodictyidae

- Oceanapia nodosa (George & Wilson, 1919)

Family Placospongiidae

- Placospongia intermedia Sollas, 1888

Family Spirastrellidae

- Desmacella jania

Family Spongiidae

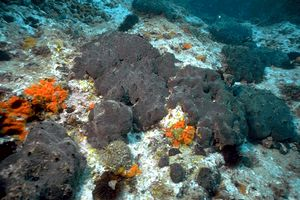
Spongia officinalis

- Spongia pertusa Hyatt, 1877
- Spongia officinalis Linnaeus, 1759
- Spongia tubulifera Lamarck, 1814
- Spongia zimocca Schmidt, 1862

Family Suberitidae

- Prosuberites laughlini (Díaz, Álvarez & van Soest, 1987)
- Suberites aurantiacus (Duchassaing & Michelotti, 1864)
- Terpios fugax Duchassaing & Michelotti, 1864
- Terpios zeteki Laubenfels 1936
- Terpios manglaris Rützler & Smith, 1993

Family Sycettidae

- Sycon

Family Tethyidae

- Tethya actinia de Laubenfels, 1950
- Tethya seychellensis (Wright, 1881)

Family Tedaniide

- Tedania ignis (Duchassaing & Michelotti 1864)
- Lissodendoryx isodictyalis (Carter, 1882)

Family Tetillidae

- Cinachyrella apion (Uliczka, 1929)
- Cinachyrella kuekenthali (Uliczka, 1929)
- Cinachyrella tarentina (Pulitzer-Finali, 1983)

Family Thorectidae

- Hyrtios proteus Duchassaing & Michelotti, 1864
- Hyrtios violaceus (Duchassaing & Michelotti 1864)

== Freshwater sponges ==
Family Metaniidae

- Acalle recurvata (Bowerbank, 1863)
- Drulia browni (Bowerbank, 1863)
- Drulia conifera Boneto & Ezcurra de Drago, 1973
- Drulia cristata (Weltner, 1895)
- Drulia uruguayensis Boneto & Ezcurra de Drago, 1968
- Metania reticulata (Bowerbank, 1863)

Family Potamolepidae

- Onosclera intermedia (Boneto & Ezcurra de Drago, 1973)
- Onosclera navicella (Carter, 1881)
- Onosclera spinifera (Boneto & Ezcurra de Drago, 1973)
- Uruguaya corallioides (Bowerbank, 1863)

Family Spongillidae

- Corvoheteromeyenia heterosclera (Ezcurra de drago, 1974)
- Saturnospongilla carvalhoi Volkmer-Rivero, 1976
- Spongilla alba Carter, 1849
- Pottsiela spoliata Volkmer-Rivero & Maciel, 1983
- Trochospongilla gregaria (Bowerbank, 1863)
- Trochospongilla minuta (Postt, 1887)
- Trochospongilla paulula (Bowerbank, 1863)

== See also ==
- List of echinoderms of Venezuela
- List of introduced molluscs of Venezuela
- List of marine molluscs of Venezuela
- List of molluscs of Falcón state, Venezuela
- List of non-marine molluscs of El Hatillo Municipality, Miranda, Venezuela
- List of non-marine molluscs of Venezuela
- List of birds of Venezuela
- List of mammals of Venezuela
