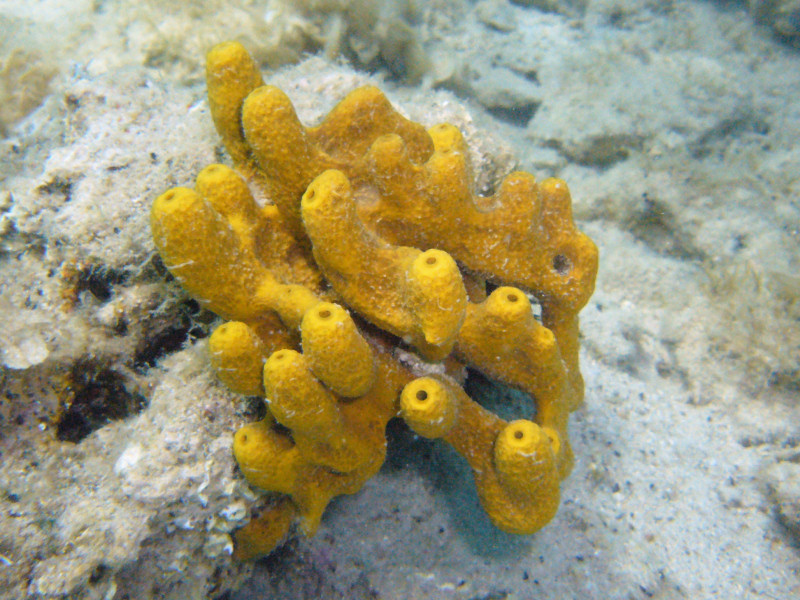

Scientific classification
- Kingdom: Animalia
- Phylum: Porifera
- Class: Demospongiae
- Order: Verongiida
- Family: Aplysinidae
- Genus: Aplysina
- Species: A. aerophoba

Binomial name
- Aplysina aerophoba (Nardo, 1833)

Synonyms
- Aplysia aerophoba Nardo, 1833; Aplysina carnosa Schmidt, 1862; Verongia aerophoba (Nardo, 1833)

= Aplysina aerophoba =

Species of sponge

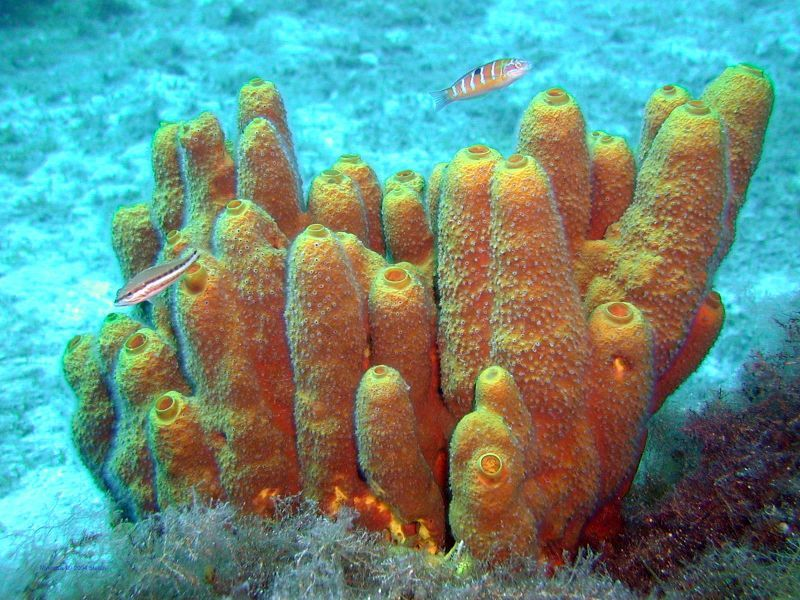
Aplysina aerophoba is sometimes heavily infested with Nausithoe polyps.

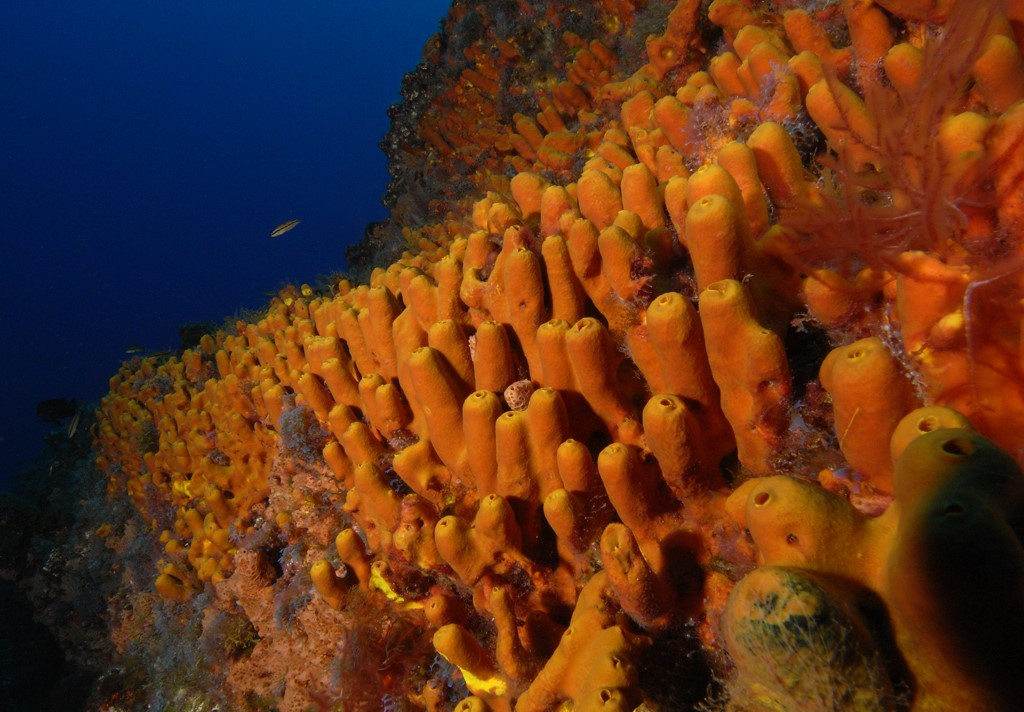
In more tropical areas like the Canary Islands Aplysina aerophoba tends to take on a smoother appearance.

Aplysina aerophoba is a species of sponge in the family Aplysinidae. It is a yellow, tube-forming or encrusting sponge and is native to the eastern Atlantic Ocean and the Mediterranean Sea; the type locality is the Adriatic Sea.

== Description ==
Aplysina aerophoba forms colonies up to 1 m (3 ft) across of irregular, yellow, tubular processes. Individual tubes are up to 4 cm (1.6 in) long and 2.5 cm (1.0 in) wide, with small oscula or exhalant pores in the centre of the flattened end. The surface of both basal mass and tubes bears small, cylindrical projections of variable length. The surface is slippery to the touch and the texture is firm and rubbery. When removed from water, this sponge turns blue, leading to its specific name "aerophoba" (Greek: "fear of air").

Aplysina aerophoba could be confused with another yellow sponge, Aplysina cavernicola, but the two have different textures, morphology and pigmentation, and occupy different habitats, with A. aerophoba being found in sunlit spots and A. cavernicola in marine caves. Another, dis-similar, dwarf yellow sponge has been found in the Mediterranean in the early 21st century; genetic analysis has confirmed that it is a miniature form of A. aerophoba.

The dwarf form is a bright sulphur yellow colour and forms small lobular patches on the surface of rocks. These do not usually touch each other, but there may be some non-apparent connection between them. Each lobe is somewhere between 2 and 15 mm (0.1 and 0.6 in) in diameter and often has small, slender cylindrical projections a few millimetres long. The surface is pitted with small puncture marks which correspond to the inhalant pores. The oscula are very small, usually less than 1 mm in diameter.

== Distribution and habitat ==
Aplysina aerophoba is chiefly a Mediterranean species, but is also found in adjacent parts of the Atlantic Ocean in Portugal and northwestern Spain. It is common in the Canary Islands. Its depth range is from the lower intertidal zone to about 20 m (70 ft), usually being found in sunlit locations. The dwarf form is known from a few locations in the Mediterranean Sea including Liguria, Provence and Corsica, and lives in caves and under overhangs in very shallow water.

== Ecology ==
This sponge feeds by drawing water in through small pores known as ostia at the base of the sponge and ejecting the water from the oscula, having filtered out organic particles such as bacteria, unicellular algae and tiny particles of detritus. It is a hermaphrodite; the gametes are released into the sea where fertilisation occurs, the larvae are planktonic and soon settle in a suitable location and undergo metamorphosis into juvenile sponges. Under certain conditions, the sponge can produce buds which separate off from the parent and form new colonies.
