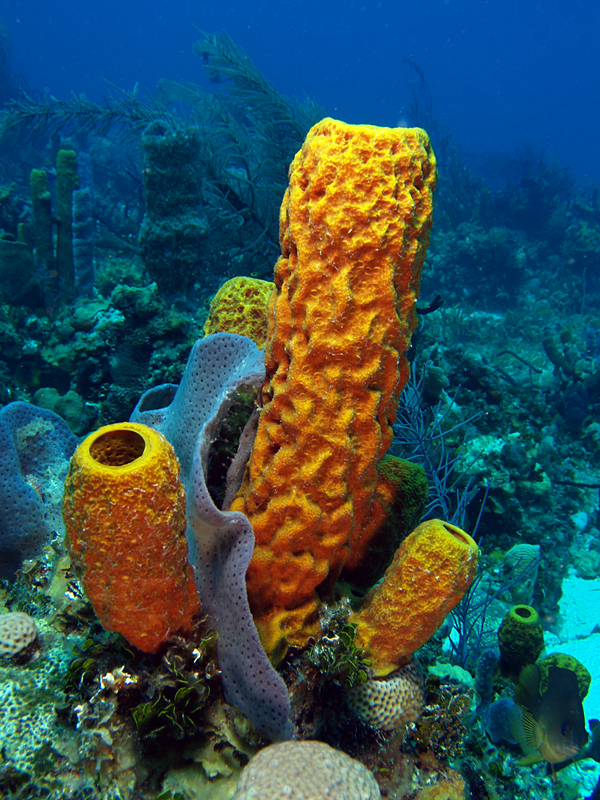

Scientific classification
- Kingdom: Animalia
- Phylum: Porifera
- Class: Demospongiae
- Order: Verongiida
- Family: Aplysinidae
- Genus: Aplysina
- Species: A. fistularis

Binomial name
- Aplysina fistularis (Pallas, 1766)

Synonyms
- List: Aplysina aggregata Topsent, 1932; Spongia fistularis Pallas, 1766; Spongia tubaeformis Lamarck, 1814; Verongia fistularis (Pallas, 1766)

= Aplysina fistularis =

Species of sponge

Aplysina fistularis, also known as the yellow tube sponge or yellow sponge, is a species of sea sponge in the order Verongiida. Aplysina fistularis is a golden or orange-brown color with a conulose surface. The animal is abundant in the Caribbean, where it is commonly found in reefs of open water areas. This sponge was first described by the Prussian zoologist Peter Simon Pallas in 1766.

== Description ==
Aplysina fistularis consists of one or more yellow tube-like structures that arise from a closed base and are sessile. The sponge has wide oscula and thin walls with ridged surfaces. Each tube is rarely over 30 centimetres (12 in) in clear water but can reach 50 centimetres (20 in) in turbid-zone reefs. Unlike the related species Aplysina insularis, A. fistularis does not develop rope-like projections around its tubes, although it may show some branching tendrils. A. fistularis does not have a silicate skeletal structure like most sponges, and was used as a bath sponge before the invention of synthetic sponges. A. fistularis produces antimicrobial activity year round, and has the potential to help future developments of antibiotics in the fight against antimicrobial resistance.

The primary predator of A. fistularis is the hawksbill turtle.

== Reproduction ==
Aplysina fistularis can reproduce both sexually and asexually. Asexual reproduction usually occurs only if a piece of the body is broken off. Newly formed sponges require a hard surface to attach to and grow on. If a reef is heavily disturbed, such as being covered by algae or sediment, A. fistularis may struggle to establish itself and grow.

== In popular culture ==
In The SpongeBob Musical, the popular animated character SpongeBob SquarePants is revealed to be an Aplysina fistularis.
