= Narrabeena lamellata =

Scientific classification
- Kingdom: Animalia
- Phylum: Porifera
- Class: Demospongiae
- Order: Verongiida
- Family: Aplysinellidae
- Genus: Narrabeena
- Species: N. lamellata

Binomial name
- Narrabeena lamellata (Bergquist, 1980)

Species of sponge

Narrabeena lamellata is a sea sponge in the family Aplysinellidae. that was first described in 1980 from a specimen washed up on Dee Why Beach from a reef 20 m below sea level, by Patricia Bergquist as Smenospongia lamellata. in 2002, she and Steve de Cook reassigned it to their newly described genus, Narrabeena, of which it is the type species.

It has only been found at its type locality.
