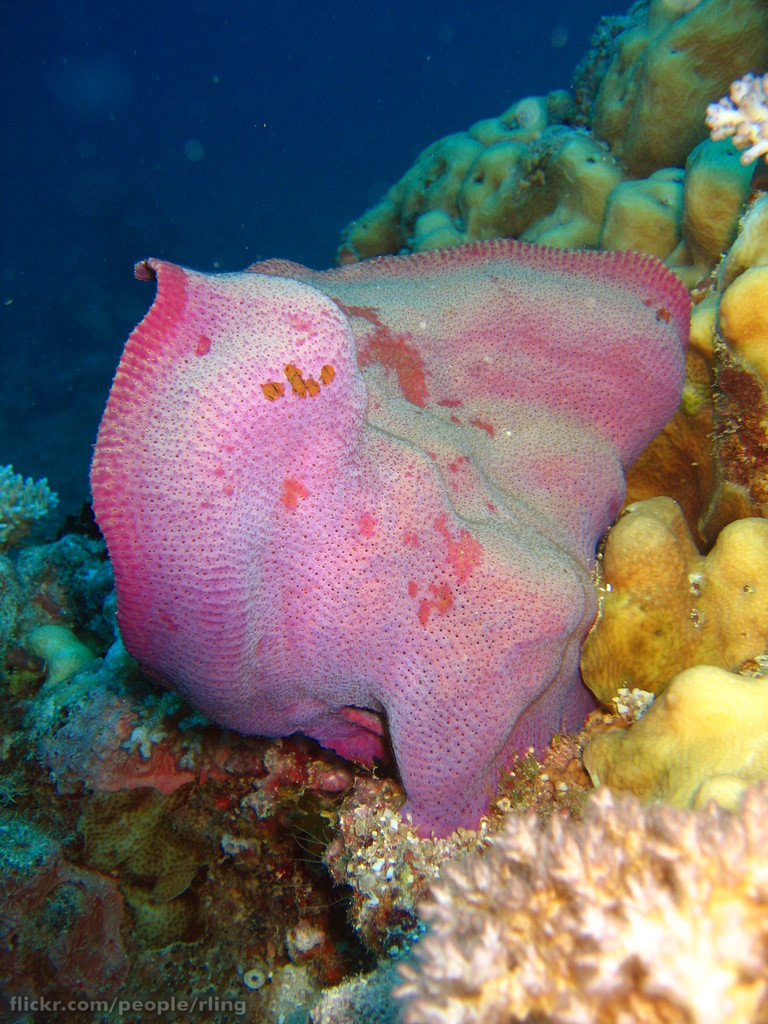
- Elephant ear sponge

Scientific classification
- Kingdom: Animalia
- Phylum: Porifera
- Class: Demospongiae
- Order: Verongiida
- Family: Ianthellidae
- Genus: Ianthella
- Species: I. basta

Binomial name
- Ianthella basta (Pallas, 1766)

Synonyms
- List: Spongia basta Pallas, 1766; Spongia grossa Esper, 1794; Spongia striata Lamarck, 1814

= Ianthella basta =

Species of sponge

Ianthella basta is a species of fan-shaped sea sponge in the class Demospongiae. It is also known as the elephant ear sponge, paper sponge, or scroll sponge.

A sponge measuring 1.7 m in height and 9.5 m circumference has been estimated to be about 8 years old.

== Distribution ==
The elephant ear sponge is found in the Indo-Pacific region. It is found on coral reefs in areas with rapid water flows.

Ianthella basta are introduced species they do not tend to invade other species territories and are noncompetitive.

== Ecology ==
The sea cucumber (Synaptula lamperti) is closely associated with the sponge and makes use of certain nutrients exuded by it.

Research is being undertaken on various metabolites and other biologically active constituents that are synthesized by the sponge.
