= Verongula rigida =

Scientific classification
- Domain: Eukaryota
- Kingdom: Animalia
- Phylum: Porifera
- Class: Demospongiae
- Order: Verongiida
- Family: Aplysinidae
- Genus: Verongula
- Species: V. rigida

Binomial name
- Verongula rigida (Esper, 1794)

Synonyms
- Luffaria rigida Esper, 1794; Spongia rigida Esper, 1794

Species of sponge

Verongula rigida is a sponge species in the class Demospongiae. The scientific name of the species was first validly published in 1794 by Eugenius Johann Christoph Esper, as Spongia rigida.

== See also ==
- 5-Bromo-DMT
- Hallucinogenic fish
