= Narrabeena nigra =

Scientific classification
- Kingdom: Animalia
- Phylum: Porifera
- Class: Demospongiae
- Order: Verongiida
- Family: Aplysinellidae
- Genus: Narrabeena
- Species: N. nigra

Binomial name
- Narrabeena nigra Kim & Sim, 2010
- Holotype site off Jeju Island'"`UNIQ--ref-00000002-QINU`"'

Species of sponge

Narrabeena nigra is a sea sponge in the family Aplysinellidae. that was first described in 2010 by Hye-Ri Kim and Chung-Ja Sim, from a specimen found in the East China Sea, at a depth of 5 m off Jeju-do. It is found attached to substrates in seas off Korea, and has also been found around the Futuna Islands.

It is a source of Bromotryptamine and its derivatives.
