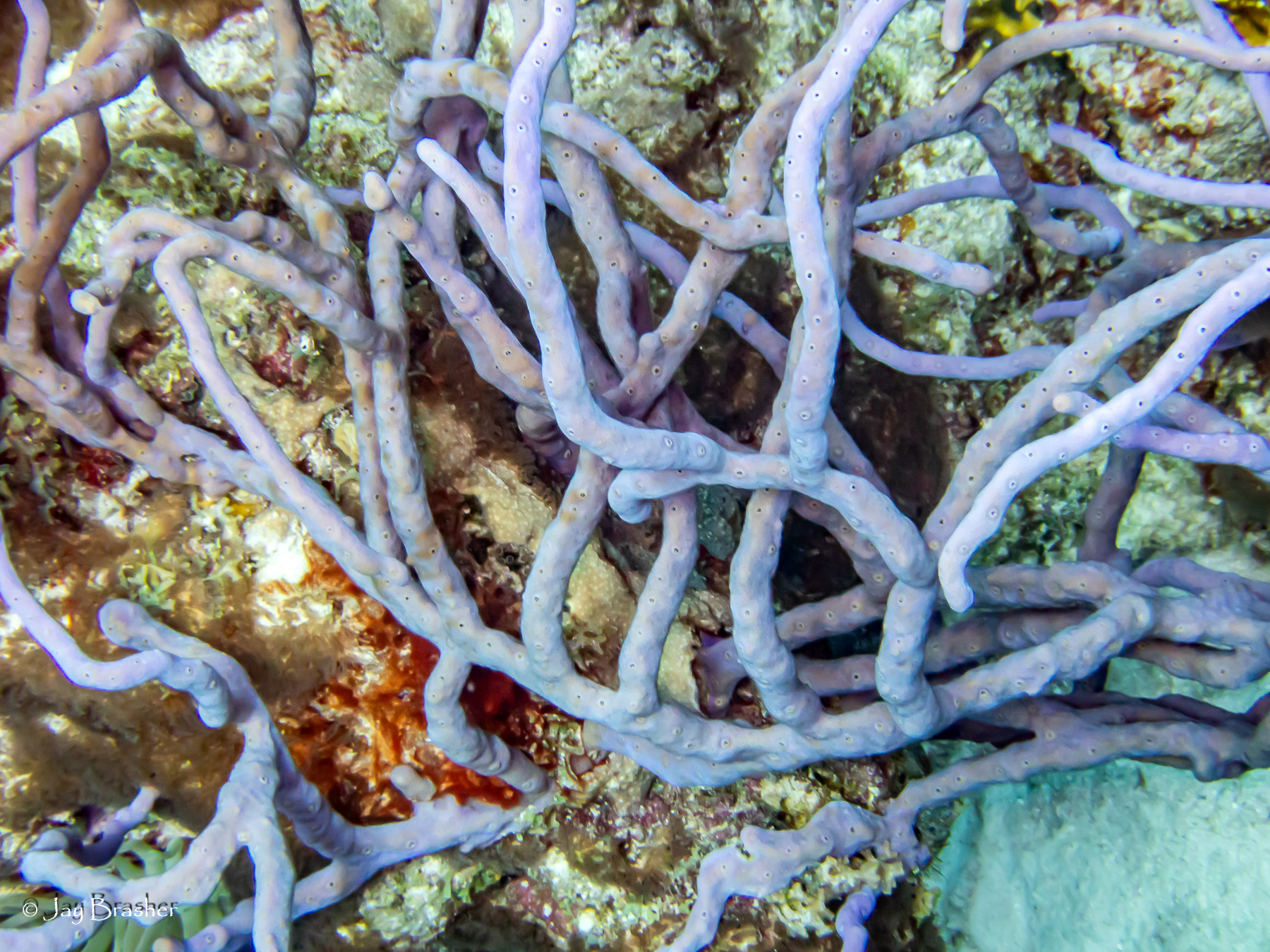
- Aplysina cauliformis

Scientific classification
- Kingdom: Animalia
- Phylum: Porifera
- Class: Demospongiae
- Order: Verongiida
- Family: Aplysinidae
- Genus: Aplysina
- Species: A. cauliformis

Binomial name
- Aplysina cauliformis Carter, 1882

Synonyms
- Luffaria cauliformis Carter, 1882; Luffaria cauliformis var. elongoreticulata Carter, 1882; Luffaria cauliformis var. rufa Carter, 1882; Luffaria elongoreticulata Carter, 1882; Luffaria rufa Carter, 1882; Verongia cauliformis (Carter, 1882); Verongia longissima sensu de Laubenfels, 1936

= Aplysina cauliformis =

Species of sponge

Aplysina cauliformis, also known as the row pore rope sponge or rope sponge, is a species of sea sponge in the family Aplysinidae. It is commonly found in shallow reefs across the tropical Atlantic Ocean, including the Caribbean Sea and the Gulf of Mexico. This sponge typically exhibits a brownish-pink or purple coloration and branches as parts of its morphology. It was first described by H.J. Carter in 1882 under the name Luffaria cauliformis.

== Description ==
Aplysina cauliformis has two distinct color morphologies. One variant of the sponge is light brown/pink and typically grows vertically, while the purple variant grows in a creeping fashion along the substrate or around other reef organisms. This sponge exhibits a branching morphology, meaning that it develops long, skinny branches rather than thick tubes with osculum. The length of the branches typically ranges from 20 to 60 cm (7.9 to 23.6 in), and they are between 0.5 and 3 cm (0.20 and 1.18 in) wide.

Many sponges have skeletons made up of spicules, which are microscopic structural elements made of either calcium carbonate or silica; sponges within Demospongiae, however, do not necessarily have spicules and instead may depend on a collagenous spongin and chitin skeleton for support. This sponge is covered in tiny oscules, which are small openings through which the sponge pulls water.

== Distribution and habitat ==
Sponges within the genus Aplysina are typically found throughout the Caribbean basin, but some have been found down the coast of South America. Most observations of Aplysina cauliformis have taken place in shallow-water coral reefs, where sponges are beginning to make up more of the foundation than corals due to warming ocean temperatures. The typical depth range for this sponge is between 2 and 20 m (6.6 and 65.6 ft). There have been some individuals observed at depths of 50 m (160 ft) where light is much more limited than in shallow water environments.

== Ecology ==
=== Feeding ===
Aplysina sponges are filter feeders, meaning that they pull water in through their osculum and filter out organic matter for consumption. However, it was recently discovered that Aplysina cauliformis hosts an abundant photosymbiont community that is responsible for roughly 70% of its carbon assimilation. This photosymbiont community continues to provide large amounts of carbon to the sponge even in shaded areas, suggesting that they are able to perform normal functions without needing sunlight. Sponge microbial communities are a hot topic of research because their purpose is not entirely understood, but in the case of many other Aplysina sponges (like Aplysina fulva), this symbiotic relationship benefits the sponge in the way of another food source. This is also the case with many corals and the symbiotic algae, zooxanthellae, which perform photosynthesis to supplement the coral's filter feeding lifestyle.

=== Reproduction ===
Sponges with branching morphologies typically reproduce asexually; the tips of the branches will break off, floating away with the current and settling in a new location. The broken branch is able to continue growing into a clone of the original sponge if it is able to establish itself; the original sponge will regrow the broken branch. A. cauliformis has this branching morphology, but it has also been found to have the ability to sexually reproduce, though the amount of biomass and energy directed to this effort is low.

=== Predators ===
Sponges have predators such as the hawksbill sea turtle, some nudibranchs, and a few species of tropical fishes. There have been observations of polychaete worms (specifically Haplosyllis spongicola) inside A. cauliformis feeding on the sponge/bacteria tissues. It has also been shown that A. cauliformis produces a chemical deterrent against hermit crabs (Paguristes puncticeps), which are typically abundant on coral reefs but have not been reported feeding on sponges.

== Aplysina red band syndrome (ARBS) ==
Sponges in the genus Aplysina are susceptible to Aplysina red band syndrome, or ARBS. This disease causes localized tissue necrosis, reduced growth, and several other negative impacts. Physically, the disease causes the presence of a red band expanding from a circular lesion around the branch of the sponge, leaving the spongin skeleton exposed and killing the living tissue. The red coloration in the band is caused by the filamentous cyanobacterium Leptolyngbya sp., but its role in other aspects of the disease is unknown. ARBS also causes a decrease in the prevalence of one of the main symbionts in the sponge, the cyanobacteria Synechococcus spongiarum; while it has not been recorded for certain, this suggests a functional consequence of the disease that could lead to other issues for the sponge. ARBS is most common in Exuma Cays, Bahamas; here, up to 15% of all Aplysina cauliformis sponges are infected with ARBS. This disease is highly detrimental to A. cauliformis populations, and it is currently more of a threat to the species than eutrophication.
