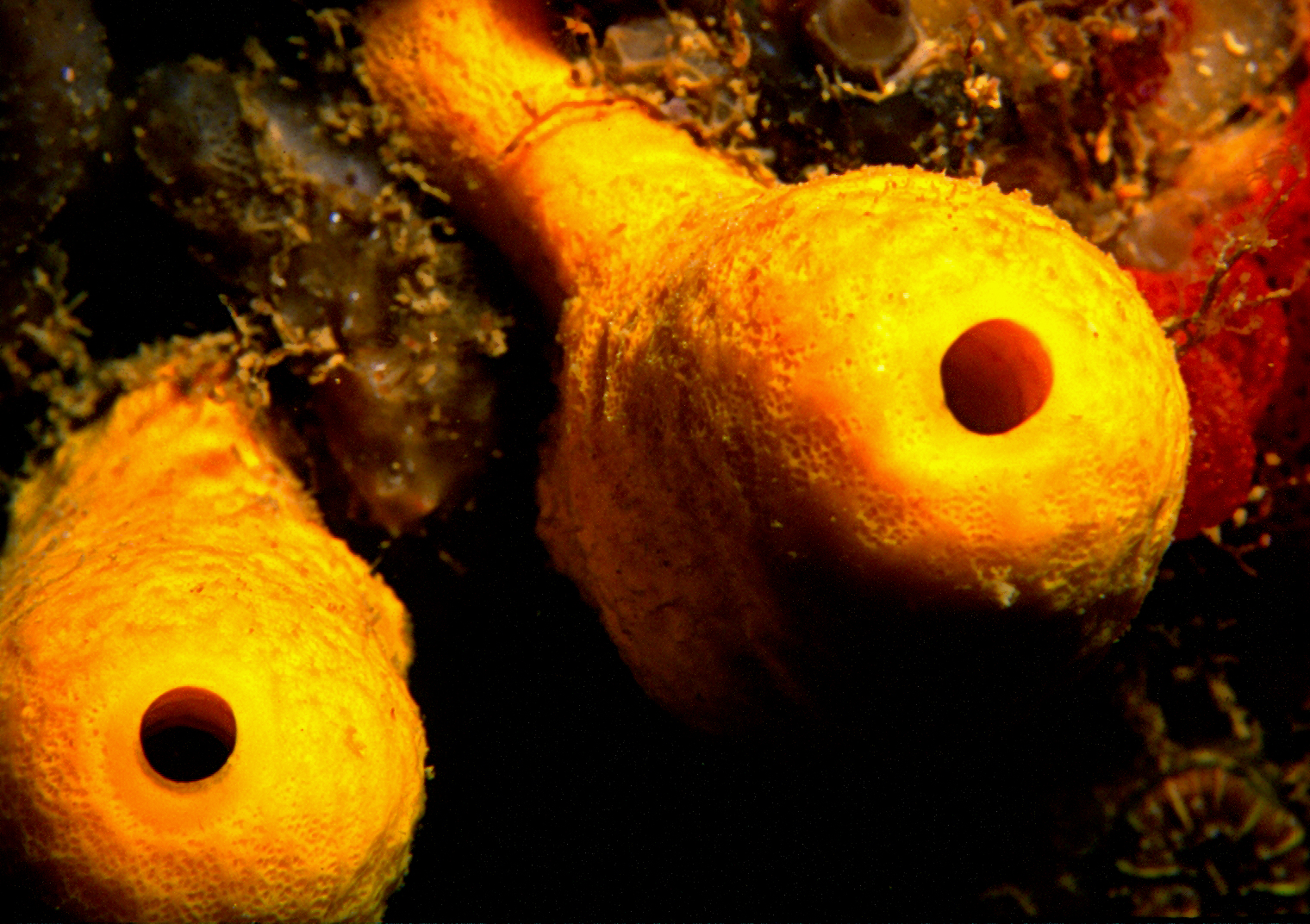

Scientific classification
- Kingdom: Animalia
- Phylum: Porifera
- Class: Demospongiae
- Order: Verongiida
- Family: Aplysinidae
- Genus: Aplysina
- Species: A. cavernicola

Binomial name
- Aplysina cavernicola (Vacelet, 1959)

Synonyms
- Verongia cavernicola Vacelet, 1959

= Aplysina cavernicola =

Species of sponge

Aplysina cavernicola is a species of sponge in the family Aplysinidae. It is native to the Mediterranean Sea where it grows in caves and under overhangs.

== Description ==
Aplysina cavernicola forms clumps that may be up to 30 cm (12 in) across. It has a base that adheres to a rock or other hard surface, out of which project a number of finger-like processes up to 6 cm (2.4 in) long and 2 cm (0.8 in) in diameter. The surface is sparsely covered with small conical protrusions, which are caused by the tips of horny fibres embedded in the tissues. There are no spicules, structural support being provided by a mesh of spongin fibres. Water is drawn in through pores known as ostia at the base of the sponge and ejected from the oscuili which are situated in slight depressions at the tips of the processes. The body colour is yellowish.

== Ecology ==
This sponge is a hermaphrodite; ciliated larvae known as parenchymella larvae are released into the water and soon settle in a suitable location and undergo metamorphosis into juvenile sponges.

This sponge accumulates brominated isoxazoline alkaloids in its tissues at concentrations of up to 10% of its dry body weight. By incorporating these biologically active compounds into experimental diets, it has been shown in feeding trials that they are distasteful to the sphinx blenny (Blennius sphinx), a polyphagous Mediterranean fish, while other sponges are readily eaten. Certain metabolic derivatives of these isoxazolines, such as dienone and aeroplysinin, are not distasteful to the fish, but may have anti-microbial properties that protect the sponge from bacterial pathogens. This sponge also bioaccumulates radionuclides, and has been used as a model organism to study the presence of isotopes such as americium-241 in seawater.
