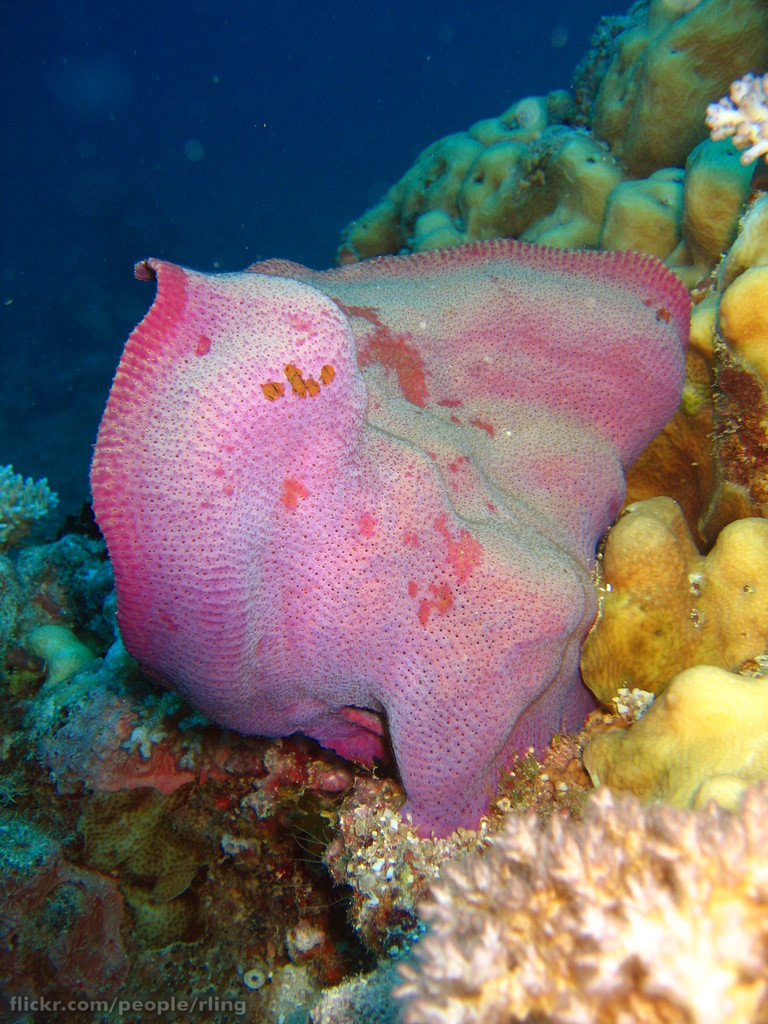
- Ianthella basta – elephant ear sponge

Scientific classification
- Domain: Eukaryota
- Kingdom: Animalia
- Phylum: Porifera
- Class: Demospongiae
- Order: Verongiida
- Family: Ianthellidae
- Genus: Ianthella; Gray, 1869

Synonyms
- Basta Oken, 1815; Haddonella Sollas, 1903

= Ianthella =

Genus of sponges

Ianthella is a genus of sponges belonging to the family Ianthellidae. The species of this genus are found in Australia, Africa and Central America.

== Species ==
There are nine recognized species:

- Ianthella aerophoba (Lendenfeld, 1883)
- Ianthella basta (Pallas, 1766)
- Ianthella concentrica Hyatt, 1875
- Ianthella flabelliformis (Linnaeus, 1759)
- Ianthella homei Gray, 1869
- Ianthella labyrinthus Bergquist & Kelly-Borges, 1995
- Ianthella quadrangulata Bergquist & Kelly-Borges, 1995
- Ianthella reticulata Bergquist & Kelly-Borges, 1995
- Ianthella topsenti (Sollas, 1903)
