= Narrabeena =

Scientific classification
- Kingdom: Animalia
- Phylum: Porifera
- Class: Demospongiae
- Order: Verongiida
- Family: Aplysinellidae
- Genus: Narrabeena; Cook & Bergquist, 2002

Type species
- Narrabeena lamellata (Bergquist, 1980)

Genus of sponges

Narrabeena is a genus of sea sponges in the family Aplysinellidae. that was first described in 2002 by Steve C. de Cook and Patricia Bergquist.

== Species ==
The following species are recognised in the genus Narrabeena:

- Narrabeena lamellata (Bergquist, 1980)
- Narrabeena nigra Kim & Sim, 2010
