= Aplysina insularis =

Scientific classification
- Kingdom: Animalia
- Phylum: Porifera
- Class: Demospongiae
- Order: Verongiida
- Family: Aplysinidae
- Genus: Aplysina
- Species: A. insularis

Binomial name
- Aplysina insularis (Duchassaing & Michelotti, 1864)

Synonyms
- List: Aplysina anomala Wilson, 1902; Aplysina fistularis f. ansa De Laubenfels, 1950; Aplysina fistularis f. insularis (Duchassaing & Michelotti, 1864); Aplysina flagelliformis var. anomala Wilson, 1902; Aplysina tenuissima (Hyatt, 1875); Luffaria insularis Duchassaing & Michelotti, 1864; Verongia ansa de Laubenfels, 1950; Verongia tenuissima Hyatt, 1875

Species of sponge

Aplysina insularis, commonly known as the yellow-green candle sponge or yellow candle sponge, is a species of sea sponge found on reefs in the Caribbean Sea and the Gulf of Mexico.

== Description ==
Aplysina insularis is a large sponge and consists of one or more cylindrical tubes united at the base. Each one narrows at the apex into a large osculum and this may be surrounded by small, finger-like projections. Slender tendrils and larger rope-like projections may also occur, and in areas with high levels of sedimentation, these may exceed the tubes in size. This sponge can grow to a length of 50 centimetres (20 in) with a tube diameter of 8 centimetres (3.1 in) and the texture is soft yet tough. The outer surface is either smooth or covered with fine conical projections. There are no silicaceous spicules in the wall but it is strengthened with a network of fibres forming a hexagonal or circular mesh pattern. The colour is yellowish brown and in deeper water changes to an intense greenish yellow because the surface layers of the sponge fluoresce in the blue (only) light that penetrates this far into the water. If bruised or removed from the water, this sponge turns dark purple or black, exuding a substance that can stain a person's skin, leaving a mark that is difficult to eradicate.

== Distribution and habitat ==
Aplysina insularis occurs in Bermuda, Florida, the Bahamas, the Virgin Islands, the Greater Antilles, the Caribbean Sea, the northern half of the Gulf of Mexico and northern Brazil. It is a moderately deep water species and occurs down to about 40 metres (130 ft) on reefs, particularly the outer reef slopes and on vertical walls.

== Ecology ==
A number of animals live inside the protective lumen of this sponge. These include the sponge cardinal fish (Phaeoptyx xenus) and several species of neon goby (Elacatinus spp.).
