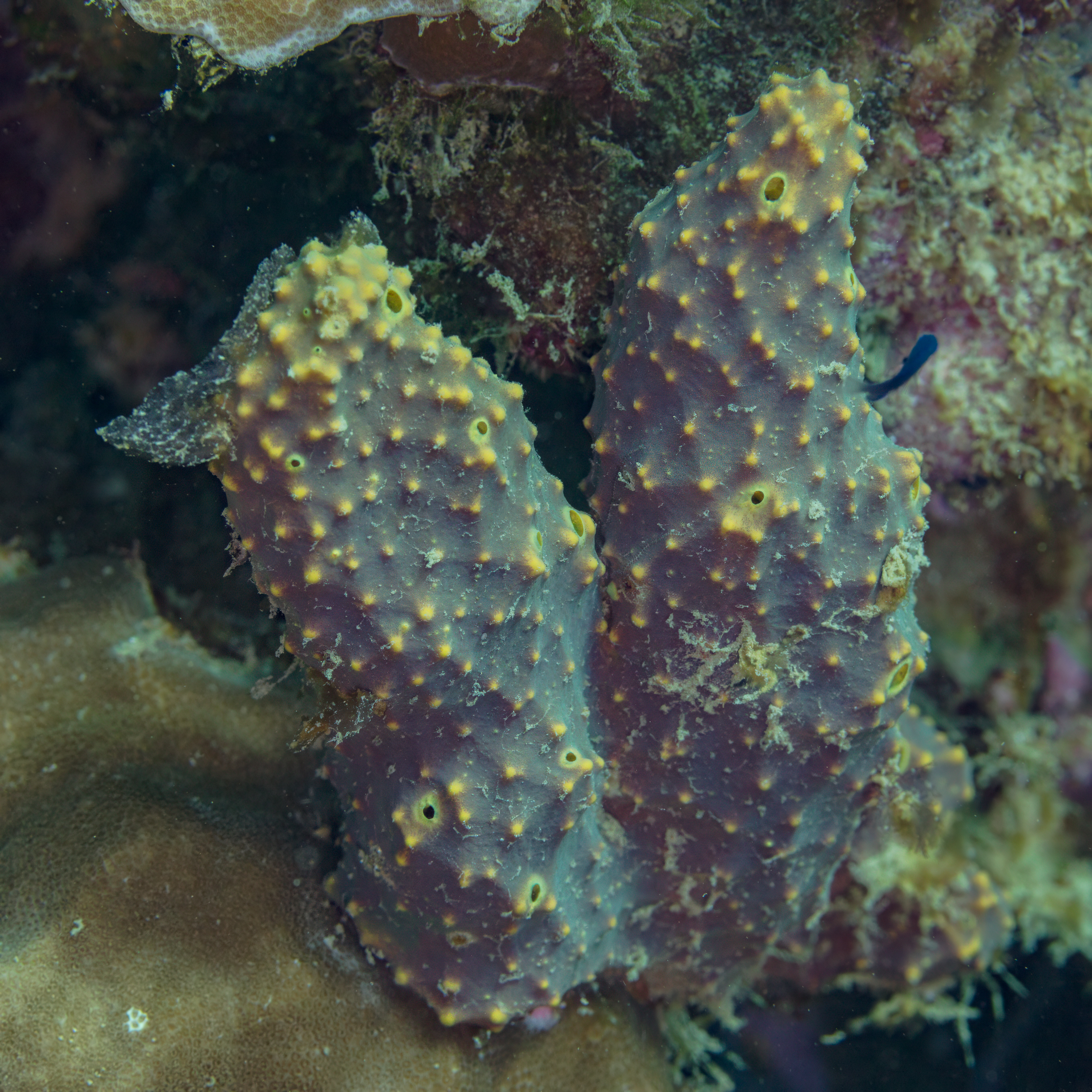
- Pseudoceratina verrucosa

Scientific classification
- Kingdom: Animalia
- Phylum: Porifera
- Class: Demospongiae
- Order: Verongiida
- Family: Pseudoceratinidae
- Genus: Pseudoceratina; Carter, 1885

Species
- Pseudoceratina arabica (Keller, 1889); Pseudoceratina durissima Carter, 1885; Pseudoceratina purpurea (Carter, 1880); Pseudoceratina verrucosa Bergquist, 1995

Synonyms
- Druinella Lendenfeld, 1889; Korotnewia Poléjaeff, 1889; Psammaplysilla Keller, 1889

= Pseudoceratina =

Genus of sponges

Pseudoceratina is a genus of sponge within the family Pseudoceratinidae. They are characterized by possession of a dendritic fiber skeleton lacking laminar bark but containing pith. They have been found in a variety of habitats including the Great Barrier Reef (Queensland, Australia) and the Red Sea. Sponges of this genus have a microbiome known to produce a variety of chemicals that are used in pharmaceutical and anti-fouling activities. Notably, a species in this genus produces a chemical that is effective in inhibiting the migration of metastatic breast cancer cells.

== Description ==
Sponges within the genus Pseudoceratina (originally named Psammaplysilla) are identified by possession of a dendritic fiber skeleton containing only pith elements while lacking the laminar bark that can be found in other sponges. Several species have been described as yellow in color, but oxidizes in air and turns a dark yellowish-green, with variations in growth type including plates, tubes, and spikey branching arms. In 2013, a proposition of a new species of Pseudoceratina was proposed. This sponge was found to have a high density of collagen fibrills, which is considered a synapomorphy for the genus Pseudoceratina, but lacks the typical skeletal framework observed in other species of this genus. Instead, this species was found within the structure of a coral. This may indicate plasticity when building a fibrous skeleton for species in the genus Pseudoceratina.

== Ecology ==
Pseudoceratina clavata can be found in patchy distributions within the Great Barrier Reef at around 15–20 meters (49–66 ft) deep.

== Symbionts ==
Symbiotic bacteria forming microbiomes within sponges is fairly standard across Porifera. They can provide chemical defenses for the sponge, a necessity for a soft-bodied, sessile creature. Pseudoceratina has been found to produce a number of different brominated alkaloids. The microbiomes of the genus Pseudoceratina are distinctively different compared to other sponges that produce a subclass of bromotyrosine alkaloids indicating that microbiomes are not conserved between taxa and across geography. However, the metabolomes produced are significantly correlated to the composition of the microbiome. A different study that compared the symbionts found in the species Pseudoceratina clavata to Rhabdastrella globostellata, both found on the Great Barrier Reef, showed a similar community structure on both the phylum- and species-level.

The natural products of their symbiotic bacteria can also be utilized for human purposes. Three different species in particular have been studied for their chemical production: Pseudoceratina arabica, Pseudoceratina clavata, and Pseudoceratina purpurpea. Pseudoceratina clavata is the first reported marine invertebrate to contain the genus Salinispora which had previously only been found in marine sediments. The ten strains of bacteria isolated from this species of sponge may control the structure of the sponge's microbial community through antagonistic activity inhibiting the growth of non-Salinospora bacteria. These strains may be useful in biopharmaceutical screenings. The natural products of Pseudoceratina have been used for enzyme inhibition, antimicrobial, parasympatholytic, cytotoxic, and antifouling bioactivites. Five new brominated alkaloids were isolated from the species Pseudoceratina arabica, found in the Red Sea, and were found to be effective in inhibiting the migration of metastatic breast cancer cells in vitro.
