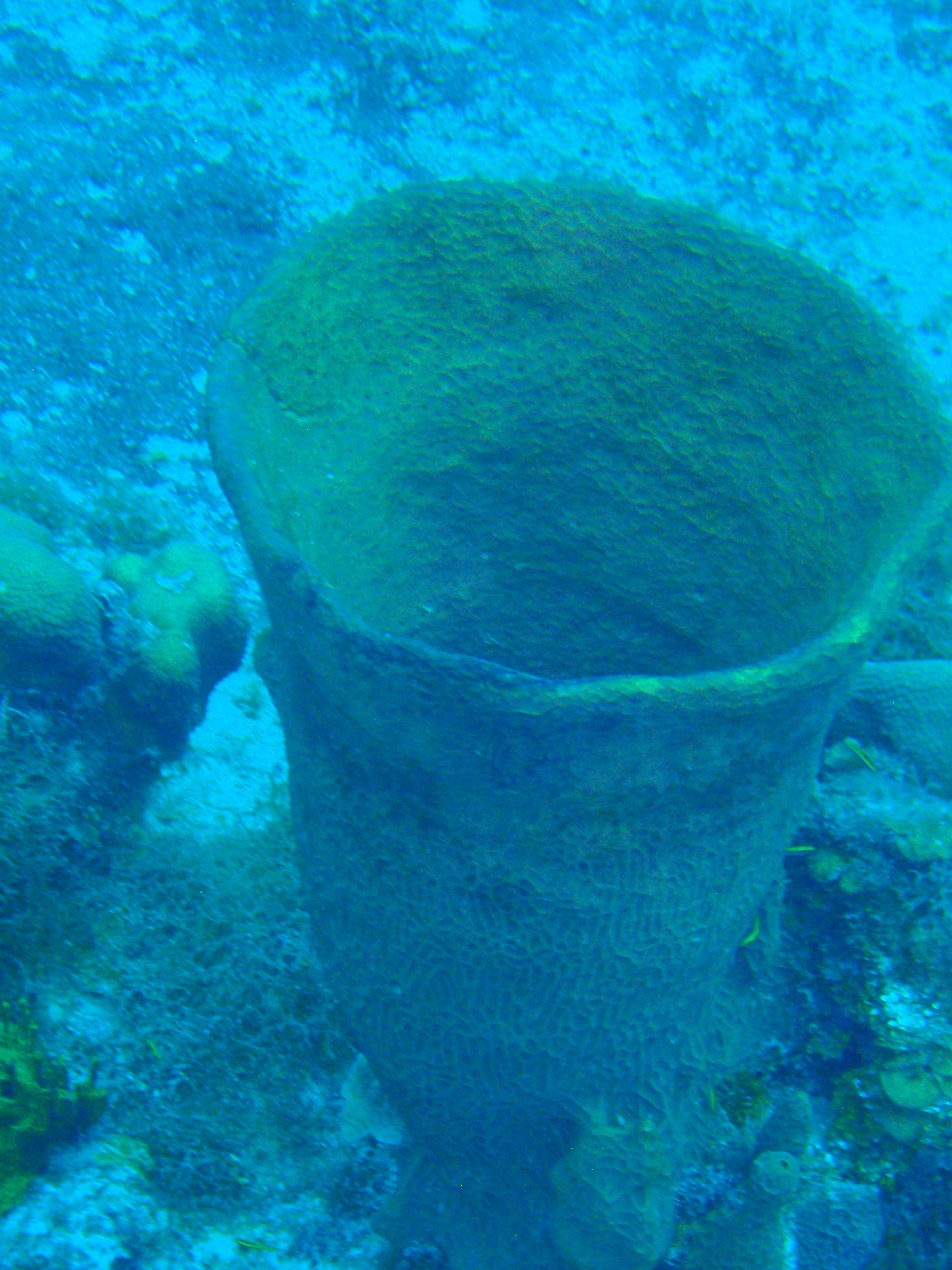
- Verongula gigantea

Scientific classification
- Kingdom: Animalia
- Phylum: Porifera
- Class: Demospongiae
- Order: Verongiida
- Family: Aplysinidae
- Genus: Verongula; Verrill, 1907

Type species
- Verongula gigantea Hyatt, 1875

= Verongula =

Genus of sponges

Verongula is a genus of sea sponges in the family Aplysinidae.

The following species are recognised in the genus Verongula:

- Verongula gigantea (Hyatt, 1875)
- Verongula reiswigi Alcolado, 1984
- Verongula rigida (Esper, 1794)
