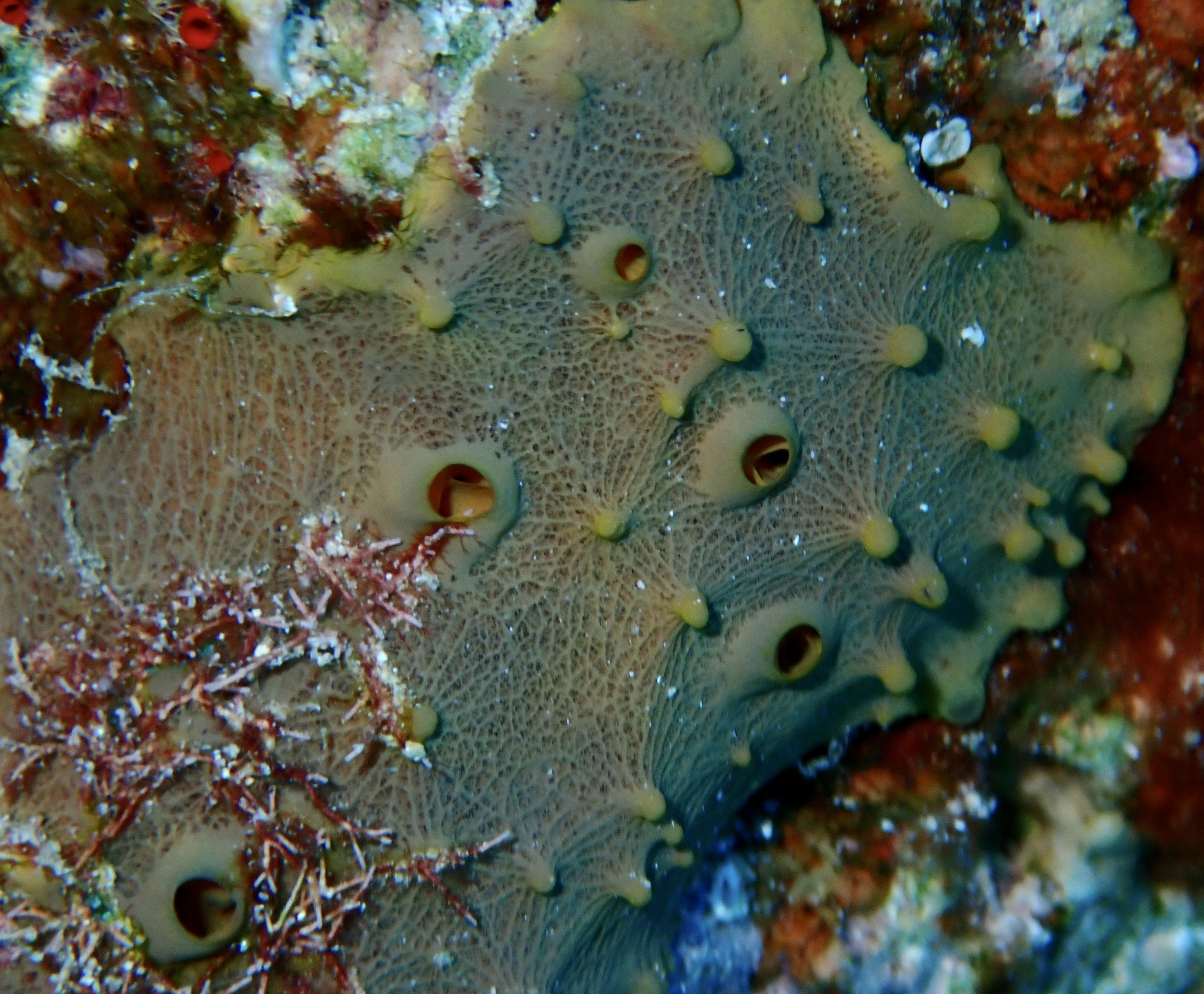
- Suberea mollis

Scientific classification
- Kingdom: Animalia
- Phylum: Porifera
- Class: Demospongiae
- Order: Verongiida
- Family: Aplysinellidae
- Genus: Suberea; Bergquist, 1995

Type species
- Suberea creba Bergquist, 1995

= Suberea =

Genus of sponges

Suberea is a genus of sponges belonging to the family Aplysinellidae.

The species of this genus are found in Southern Hemisphere.

Species:

- Suberea clavata (Pulitzer-Finali, 1982)
- Suberea creba Bergquist, 1995
- Suberea elegans (Lendenfeld, 1888)
- Suberea etiennei van Soest, Kaiser & Van Syoc, 2011
- Suberea flavolivescens (Hofman & Kielman, 1992)
- Suberea fusca (Carter, 1880)
- Suberea ianthelliformis (Lendenfeld, 1888)
- Suberea laboutei Bergquist, 1995
- Suberea meandrina Kelly, 2015
- Suberea mollis (Row, 1911)
- Suberea pedunculata (Lévi, 1969)
- Suberea praetensa (Row, 1911)
- Suberea purpureaflava Gugel, Wagler & Brümmer, 2011
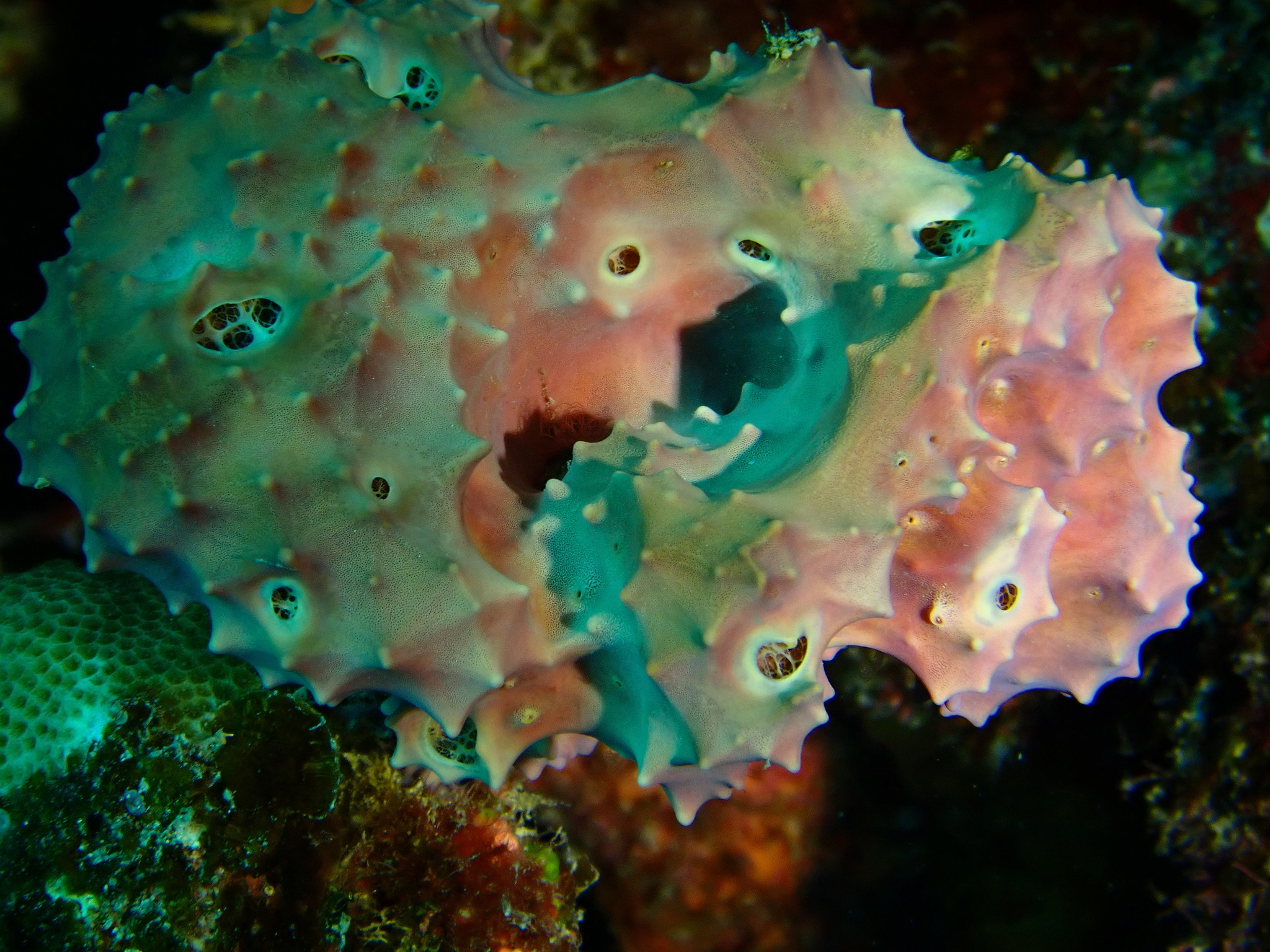
Suberea laboutei

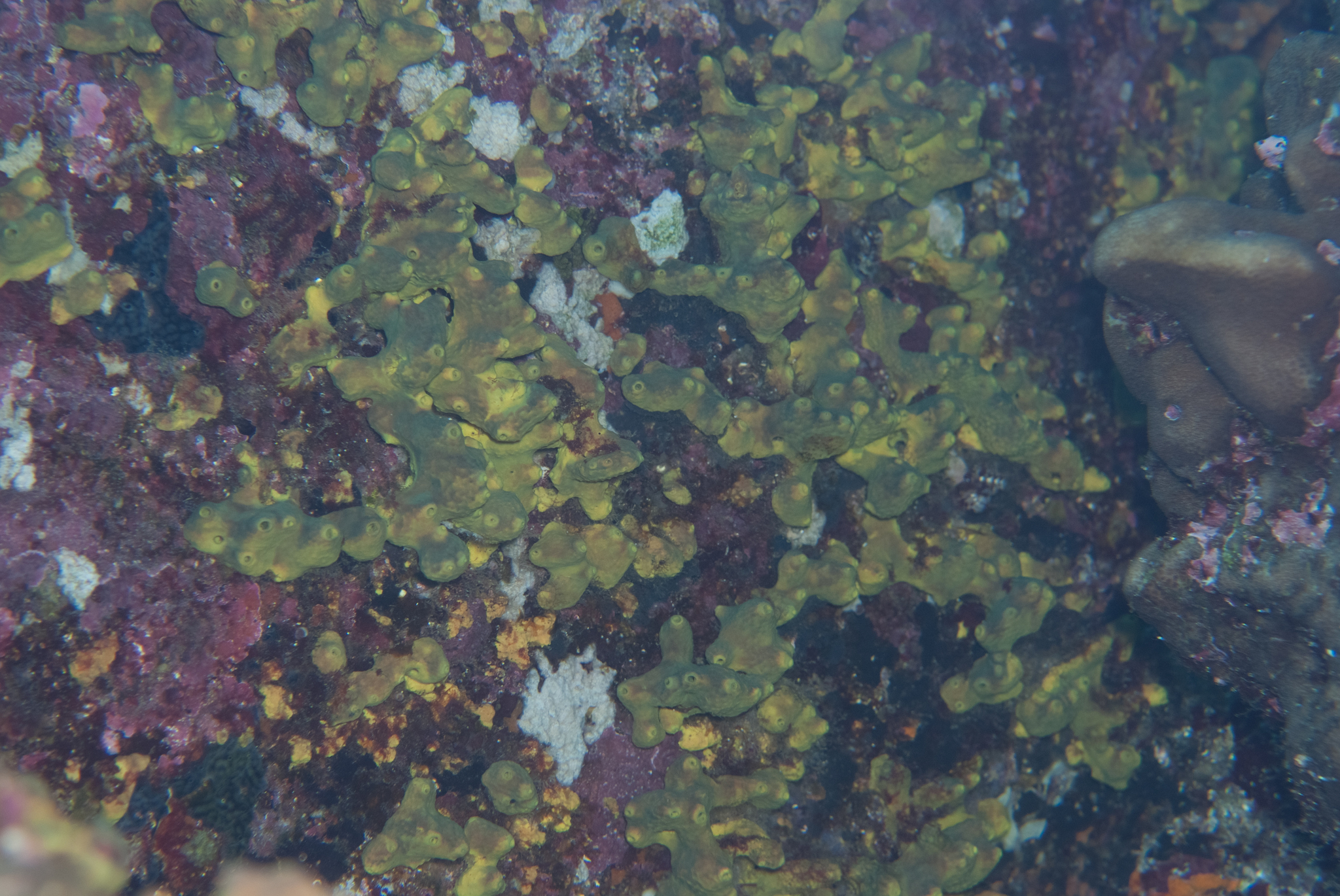
Suberea esmeralda
