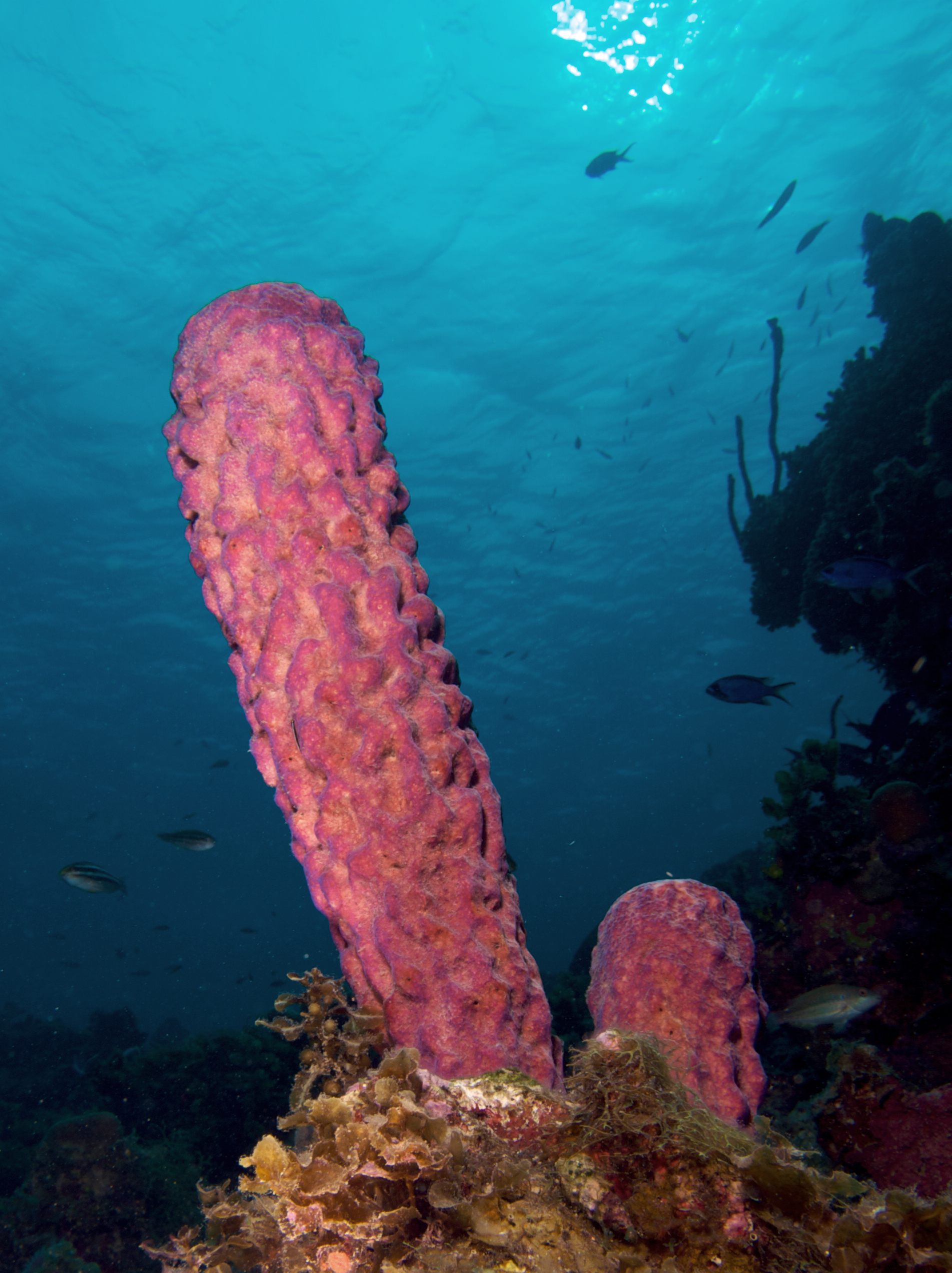
- Aplysina archeri

Scientific classification
- Kingdom: Animalia
- Phylum: Porifera
- Class: Demospongiae
- Order: Verongiida
- Family: Aplysinidae
- Genus: Aplysina; Nardo, 1834

Species
- See text

Synonyms
- Aplysia Nardo, 1833; Luffaria Duchassaing & Michelotti, 1864; Verongia Bowerbank, 1845

= Aplysina =

Genus of sponges

Aplysina is a genus of sea sponges in the order Verongiida. It was first authenticated and described by Giovanni Domenico Nardo in 1834.

== Species ==
The following species are recognised in the genus Aplysina:

- Aplysina aerophoba (Nardo, 1833)
- Aplysina airapii Gómez, González-Acosta, Sánchez-Ortíz, Hoffman & Hernández-Guerrero, 2018
- Aplysina alcicornis Pinheiro, Hajdu & Custódio, 2007
- Aplysina archeri (Higgin, 1875)
- Aplysina azteca Gómez & Bakus, 1992
- Aplysina bathyphila Maldonado & Young, 1998
- Aplysina cacos Lendenfeld, 1888
- Aplysina caissara Pinheiro & Hajdu, 2001
- Aplysina capensis Carter, 1875
- Aplysina cauliformis (Carter, 1882)
- Aplysina cavernicola (Vacelet, 1959)
- Aplysina cellulosa Hyatt, 1875
- Aplysina chiriquiensis Díaz, van Soest, Rützler & Guzman, 2005
- Aplysina clathrata Cruz-Barraza, Carballo, Rocha-Olivares, Ehrlich & Hog, 2012
- Aplysina compacta Carter, 1881
- Aplysina cristagallus Pinheiro, Hajdu & Custódio, 2007
- Aplysina encarnacionae Gómez, González-Acosta, Sánchez-Ortíz, Hoffman & Hernández-Guerrero, 2018
- Aplysina fistularis (Pallas, 1766)
- Aplysina fulva (Pallas, 1766)
- Aplysina gerardogreeni Gómez & Bakus, 1992
- Aplysina higginsii Lendenfeld, 1889
- Aplysina hirsuta (Hyatt, 1875)
- Aplysina holda Lendenfeld, 1889
- Aplysina inflata Carter, 1881
- Aplysina insularis (Duchassaing & Michelotti, 1864)
- Aplysina lactuca Pinheiro, Hajdu & Custódio, 2007
- Aplysina lacunosa (Lamarck, 1814)
- Aplysina lendenfeldi Bergquist, 1980
- Aplysina lingua Pinheiro, Hajdu & Custódio, 2007
- Aplysina meandrina Lendenfeld, 1889
- Aplysina minima Hentschel, 1914
- Aplysina minuta Lendenfeld, 1889
- Aplysina muricyana Pinheiro, Hajdu & Custódio, 2007
- Aplysina ocracea Alcolado, 1984
- Aplysina orthoreticulata Pinheiro, Hajdu & Custódio, 2007
- Aplysina pergamentacea Hechtel, 1983
- Aplysina primitiva Burton, 1959
- Aplysina procumbens Lendenfeld, 1889
- Aplysina pseudolacunosa Pinheiro, Hajdu & Custódio, 2007
- Aplysina reticulata Lendenfeld, 1889
- Aplysina revillagigedi Cruz-Barraza, Carballo, Rocha-Olivares, Ehrlich & Hog, 2012
- Aplysina sciophila Rützler, Piantoni, van Soest & Díaz, 2014
- Aplysina sinuscaliforniensis Gómez, González-Acosta, Sánchez-Ortíz, Hoffman & Hernández-Guerrero, 2018
- Aplysina solangeae Pinheiro, Hajdu & Custódio, 2007
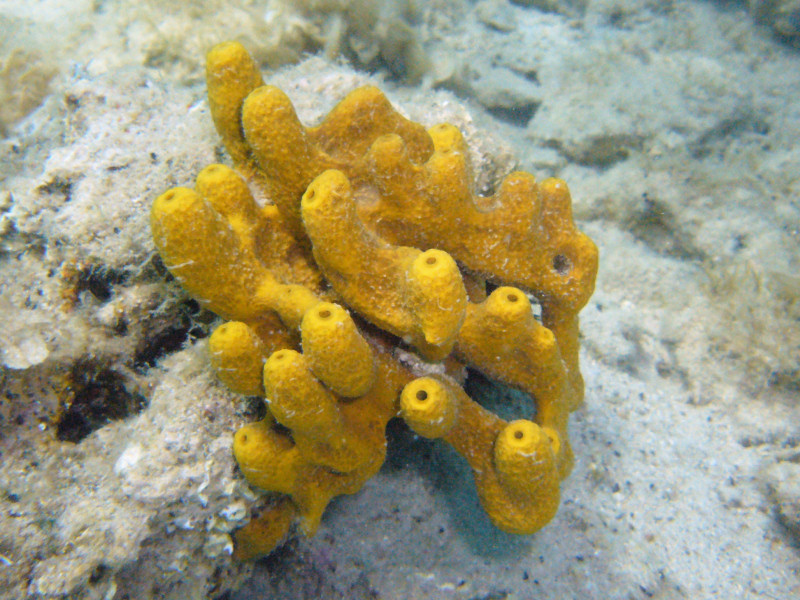
Aplysina aerophoba

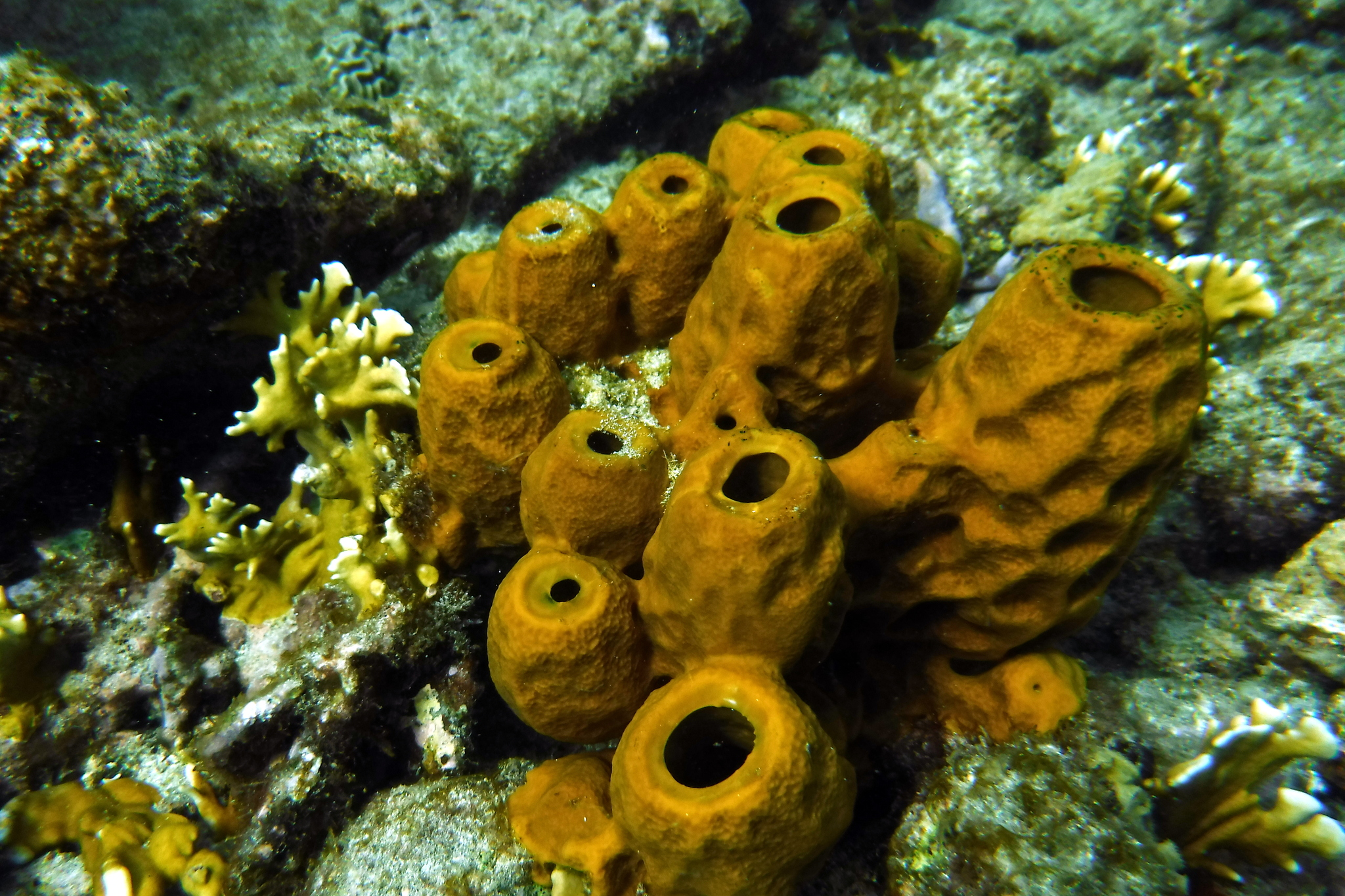
Aplysina fistularis

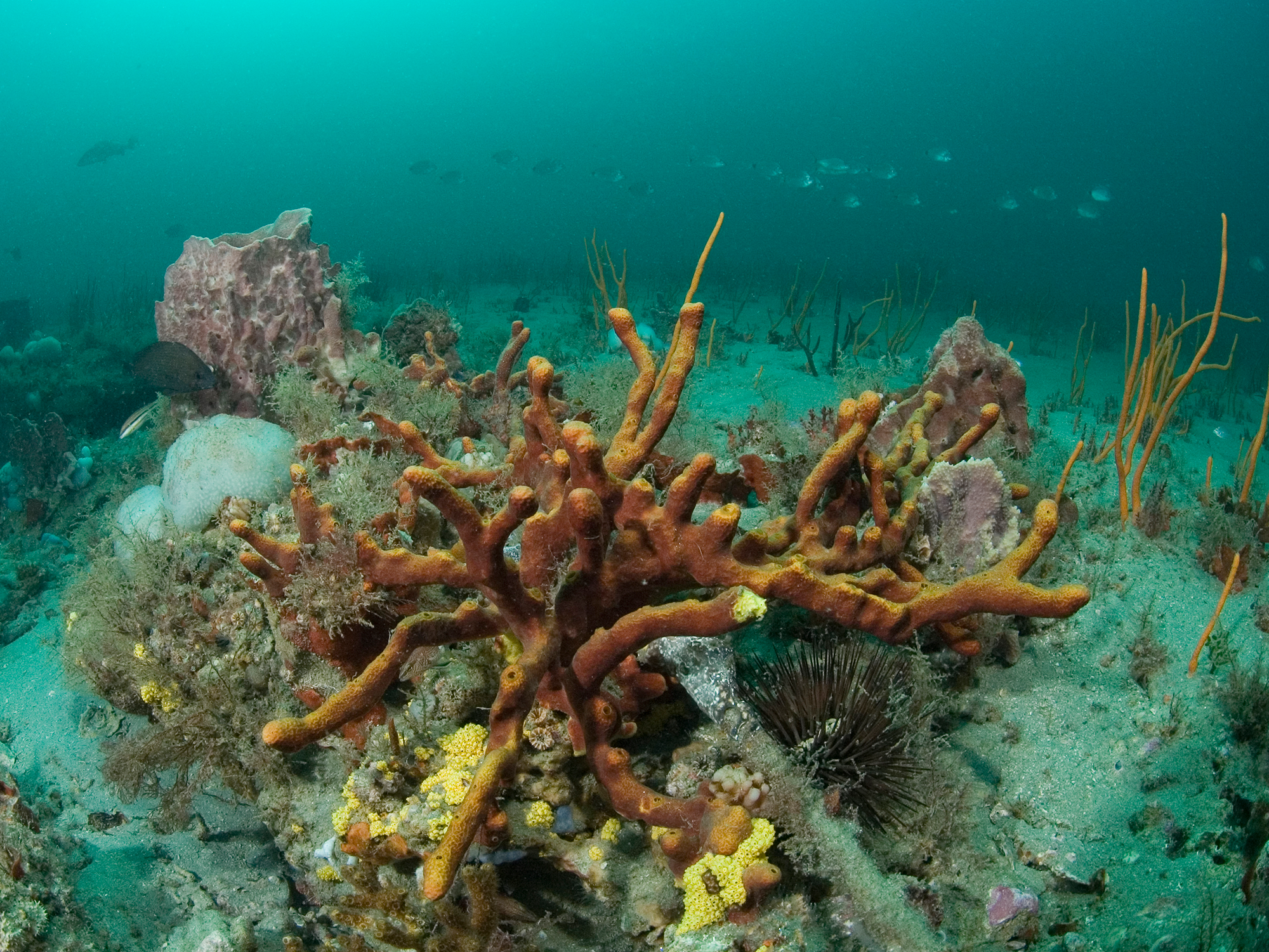
Aplysina fulva

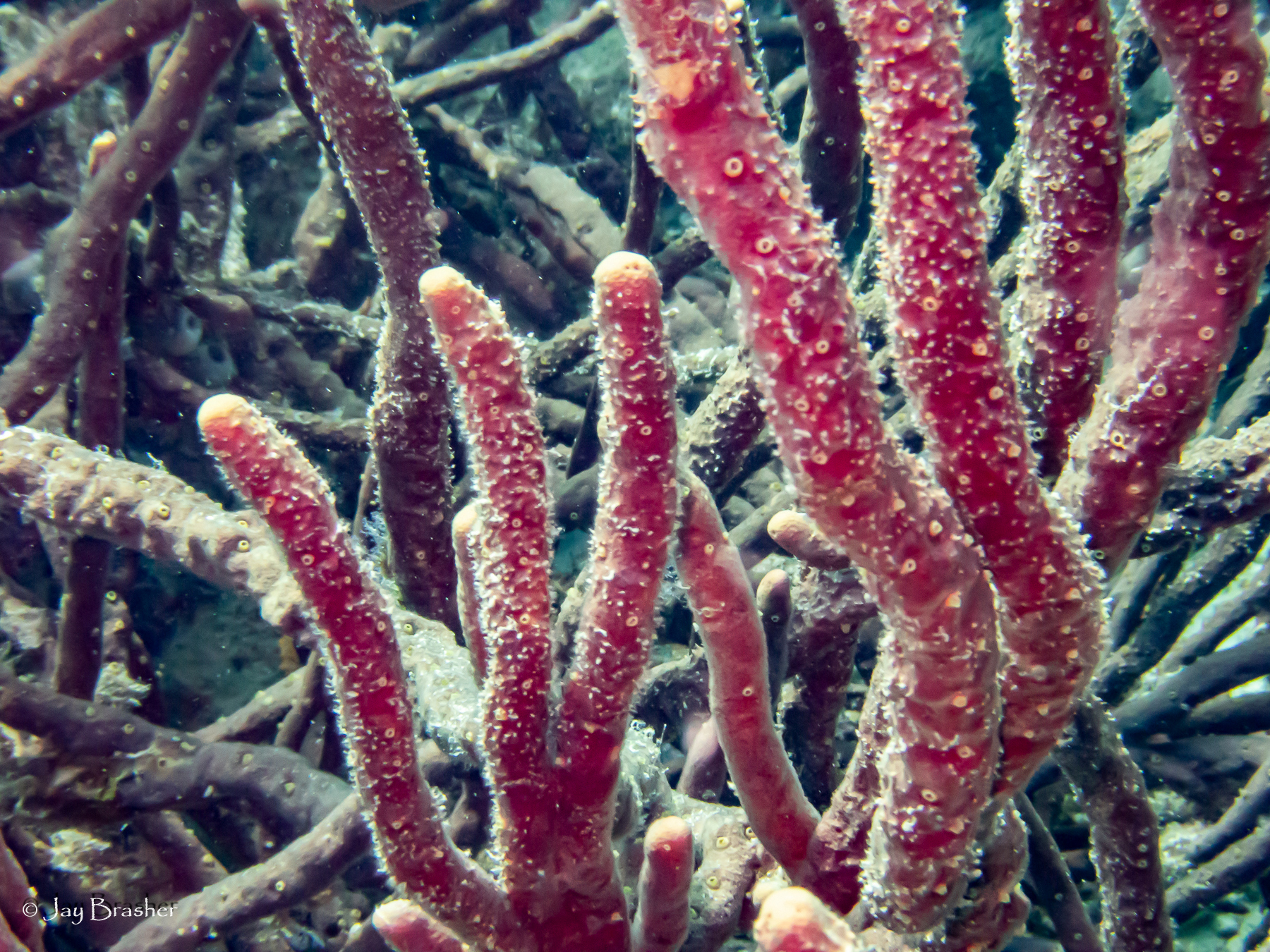
Aplysina cauliformis
