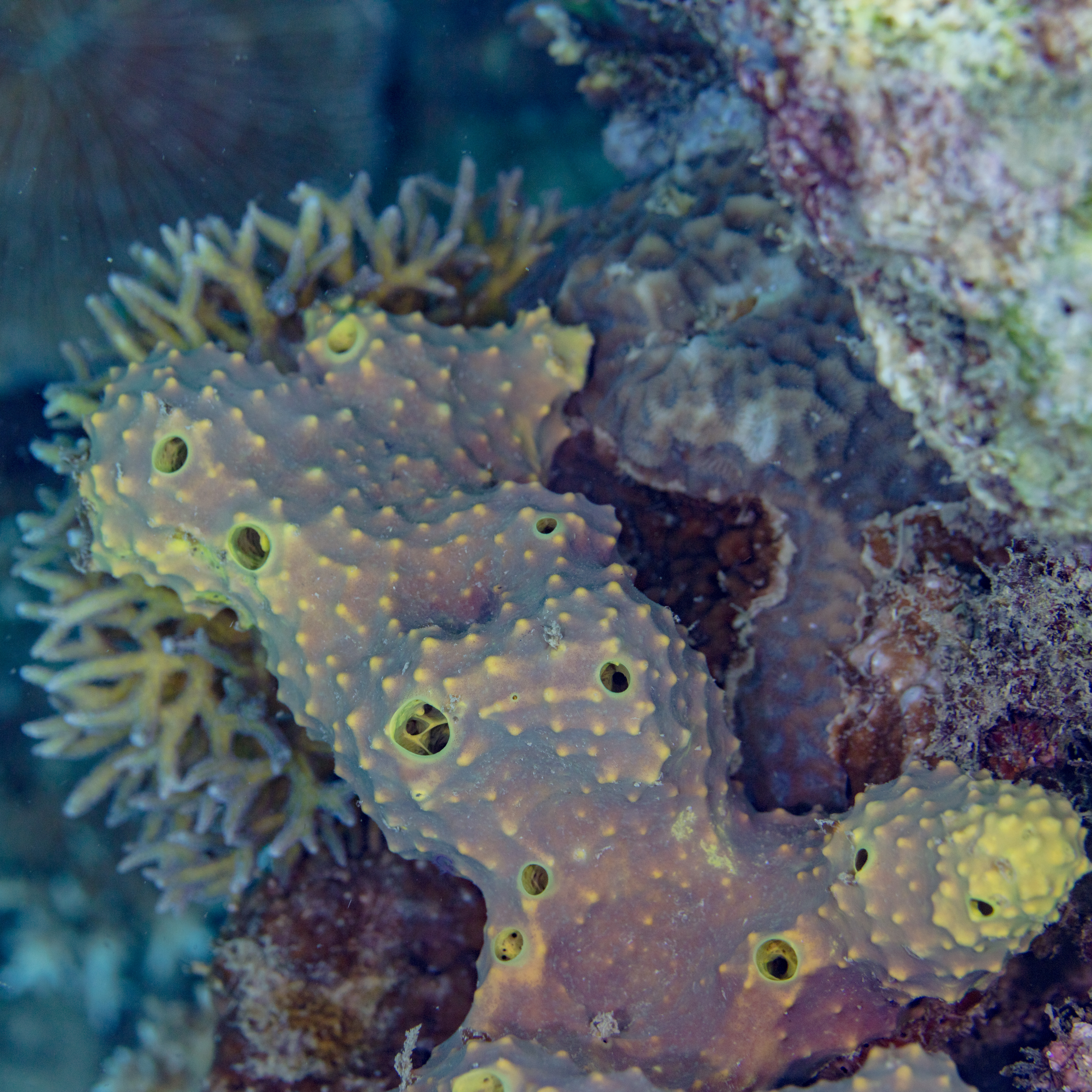
- Pseudoceratina verrucosa

Scientific classification
- Kingdom: Animalia
- Phylum: Porifera
- Class: Demospongiae
- Order: Verongiida
- Family: Pseudoceratinidae; Carter, 1885

= Pseudoceratinidae =

Family of sponges

Pseudoceratinidae is a family of sponges belonging to the order Verongiida.

Genera:

- Pseudoceratina Carter, 1885
