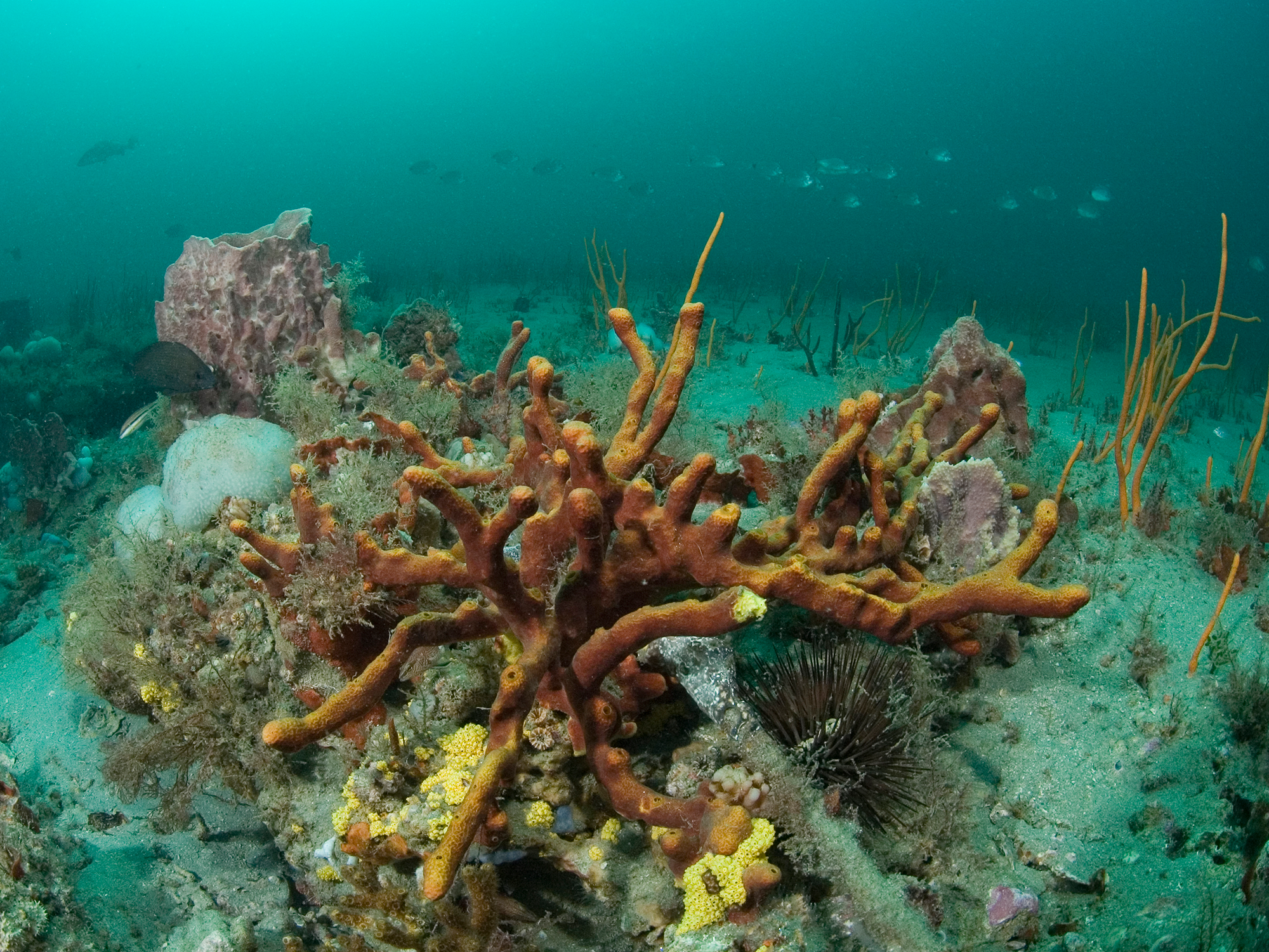

Scientific classification
- Kingdom: Animalia
- Phylum: Porifera
- Class: Demospongiae
- Order: Verongiida
- Family: Aplysinidae
- Genus: Aplysina
- Species: A. fulva

Binomial name
- Aplysina fulva (Pallas, 1766)

Synonyms
- Spongia fulva Pallas, 1766; Aplysina cancellata (Linnaeus, 1767); Aplysina fragilis Wilson, 1902; Aplysina rugosa Wilson, 1902; Luffaria fulva (Pallas, 1766); Spongia cancellata Linnaeus, 1767; Verongia fulva (Pallas, 1766)

= Aplysina fulva =

Species of sponge

Aplysina fulva, known as the scattered pore rope sponge, is a species of sponge in the family Aplysinidae. The species is found in the Caribbean Sea as well as off the coast of Brazil.

Until 1996, it was thought that Aplysina fulva and Aplysina fistularis were the same species; this was disproven because of the difference in secondary metabolites of the sponges.
