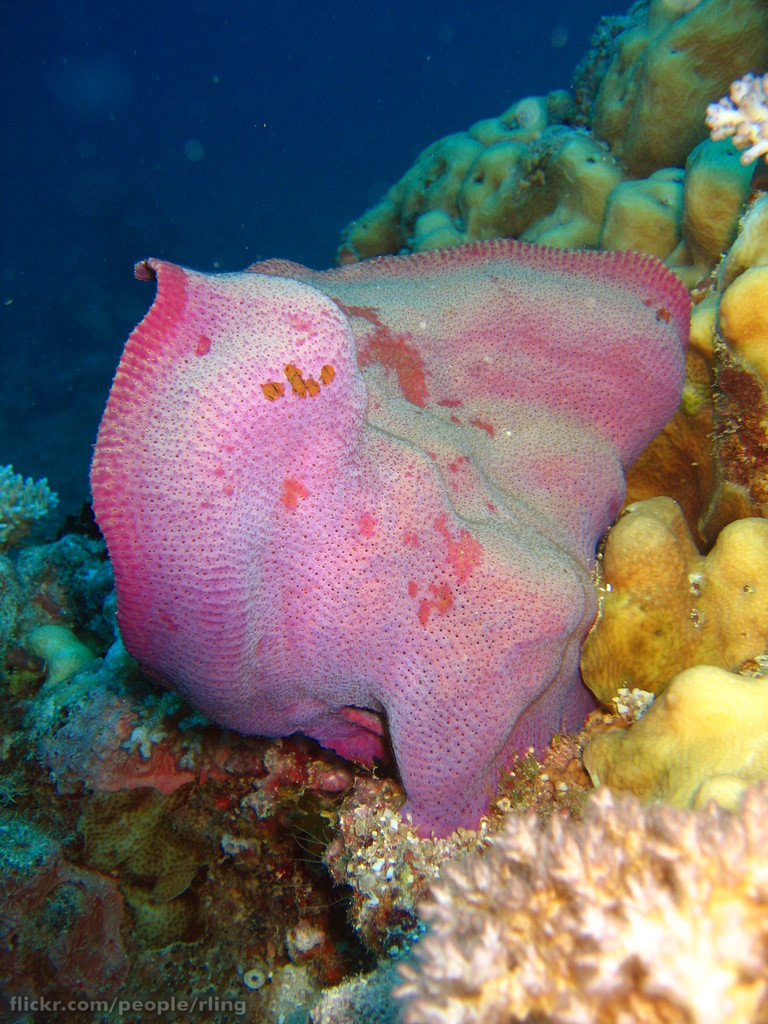
- Lanthella basta

Scientific classification
- Domain: Eukaryota
- Kingdom: Animalia
- Phylum: Porifera
- Class: Demospongiae
- Order: Verongiida
- Family: Ianthellidae

= Ianthellidae =

Family of sponges

Ianthellidae is a family of sponges belonging to the order Verongiida.

Genera:

- Anomoianthella Bergquist, 1980
- Basta Pallas, 1766
- Hexadella Topsent, 1896
- Ianthella Gray, 1869
- Vansoestia Díaz, Thacker, Redmond, Pérez & Collins, 2015
