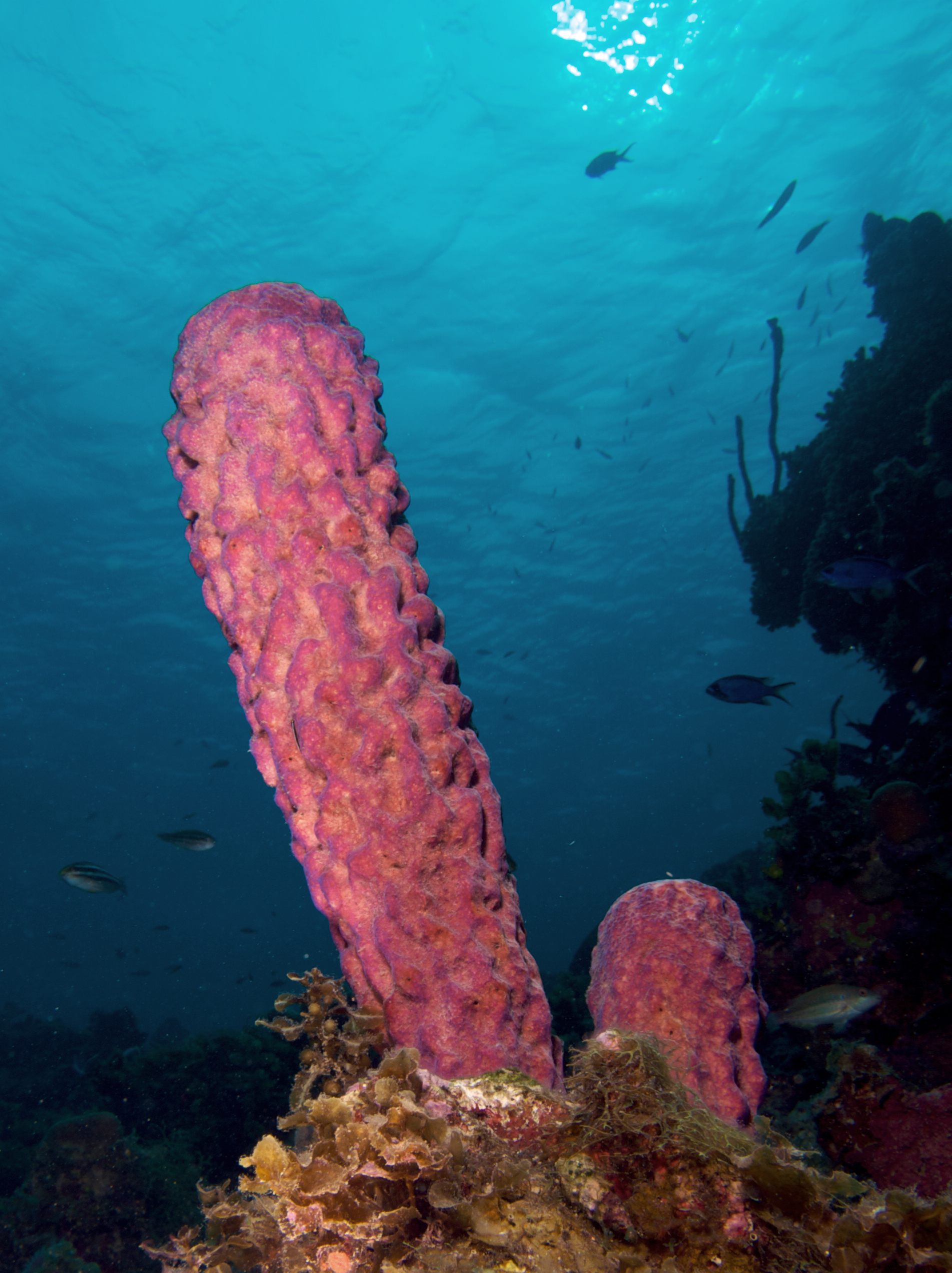
- A. archeri, Haiti

Scientific classification
- Domain: Eukaryota
- Kingdom: Animalia
- Phylum: Porifera
- Class: Demospongiae
- Order: Verongiida
- Family: Aplysinidae
- Genus: Aplysina
- Species: A. archeri

Binomial name
- Aplysina archeri (Higgin, 1875)

Synonyms
- Luffaria archeri Higgin, 1875; Verongia archeri (Higgin, 1875)

= Aplysina archeri =

Species of sponge

Aplysina archeri, also known as a stove-pipe sponge because of its shape, is a species of tube sponge that has long tube-like structures of cylindrical shape. Although they can grow in a single tube, they often grow in large groups of up to 22 tubes. A single tube can grow up to 5 feet (1.5 m) high and 3 inches (7.6 cm) thick. These sponges mostly live in the Western Atlantic Ocean: the Caribbean, The Bahamas, Florida, and Bonaire. Like most sponges, they are filter feeders; they eat food such as plankton or suspended detritus as it passes them. Very little is known about their behavioral patterns except for their feeding ecology and reproductive biology. Tubes occur in varying colors including lavender, pink, gray, and brown. They reproduce both by asexual and sexual reproduction. These sponges take hundreds of years to grow and never stop growing until they die. Snails are among their natural predators. The population density of these sponges is decreasing because of oil spills and other pollution.
