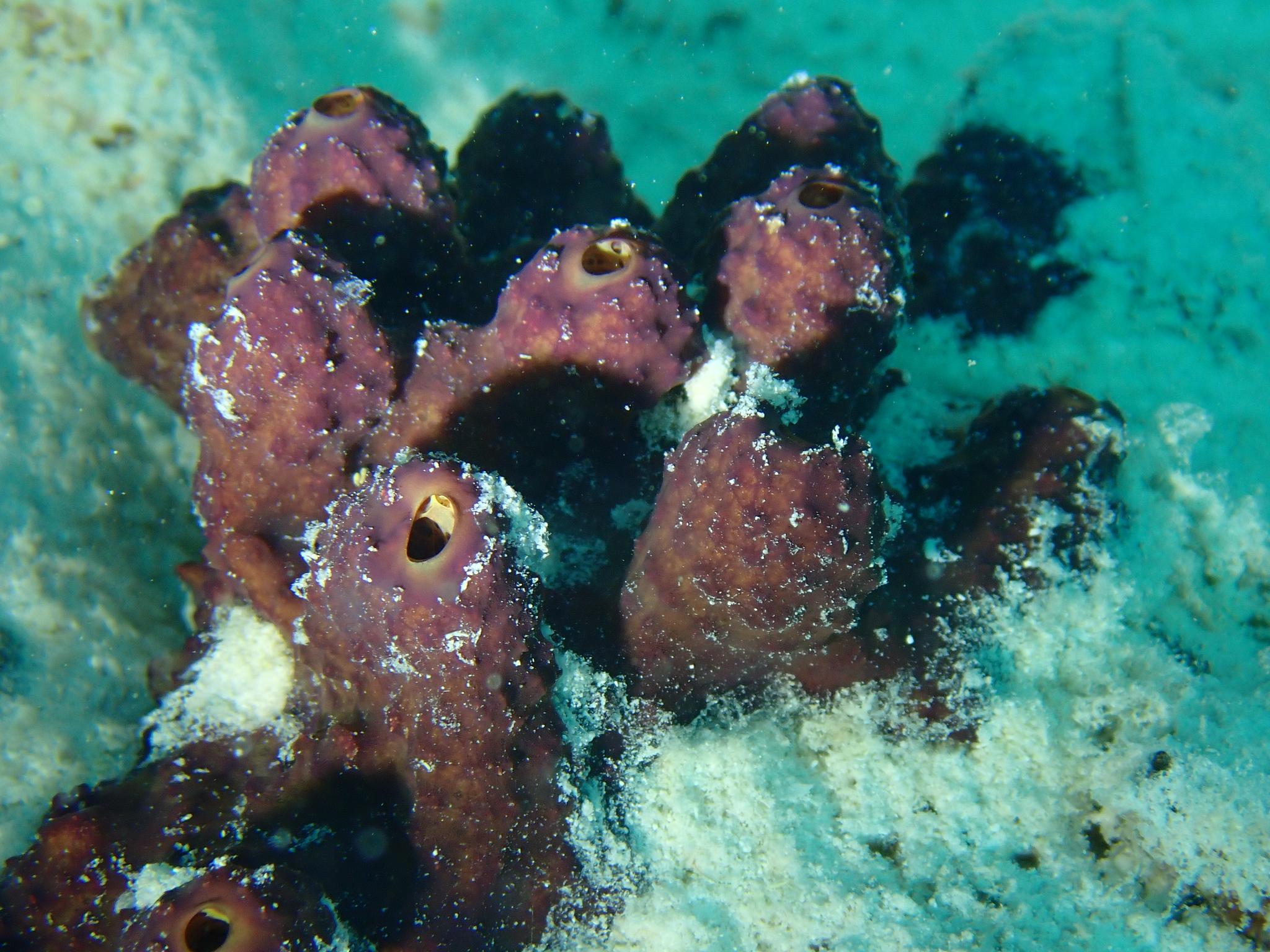
- Aplysinella rhax

Scientific classification
- Kingdom: Animalia
- Phylum: Porifera
- Class: Demospongiae
- Order: Verongiida
- Family: Aplysinellidae; Bergquist, 1980

= Aplysinellidae =

Family of sponges

Aplysinellidae is a family of sponges belonging to the order Verongiida. The family was first described in 1980 by Patricia Bergquist.

Genera:

- Aplysinella Bergquist, 1980
- Narrabeena Cook & Bergquist, 2002
- Patriciaplysina Van Soest & Hooper, 2020
- Suberea Bergquist, 1995
