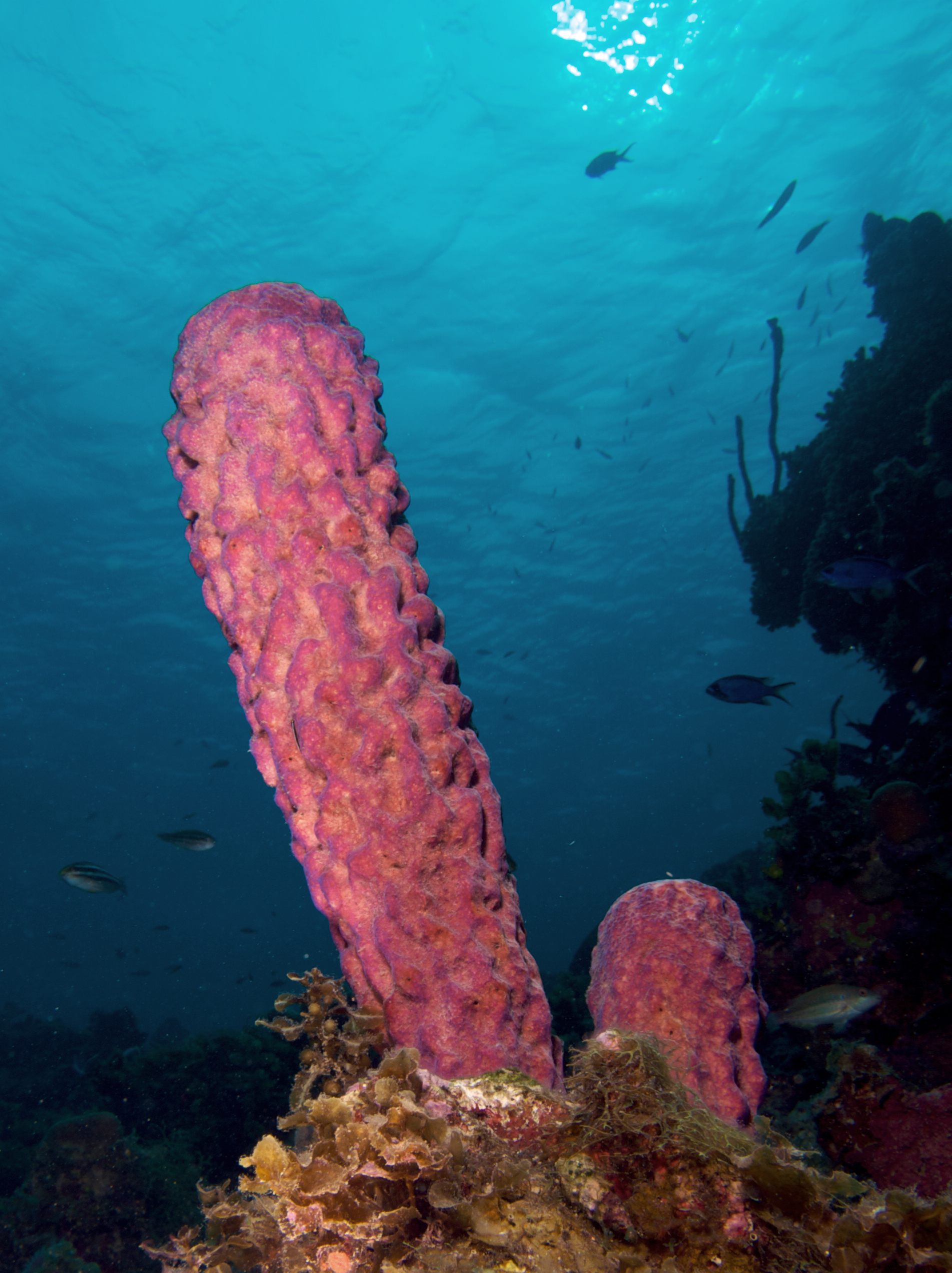
- Aplysina archeri

Scientific classification
- Kingdom: Animalia
- Phylum: Porifera
- Class: Demospongiae
- Order: Verongiida
- Family: Aplysinidae; Carter, 1875

Genera
- Aiolochroia; Aplysina; Verongula

Synonyms
- Verongiidae de Laubenfels, 1932

= Aplysinidae =

Family of sponges

Aplysinidae is a family of sea sponges in the order Verongiida. Its growths are either shaped like a fan or a club. Contained within the family are three recognized genera and six unrecognized ones. It was first authenticated and described by Henry John Carter in 1875.
