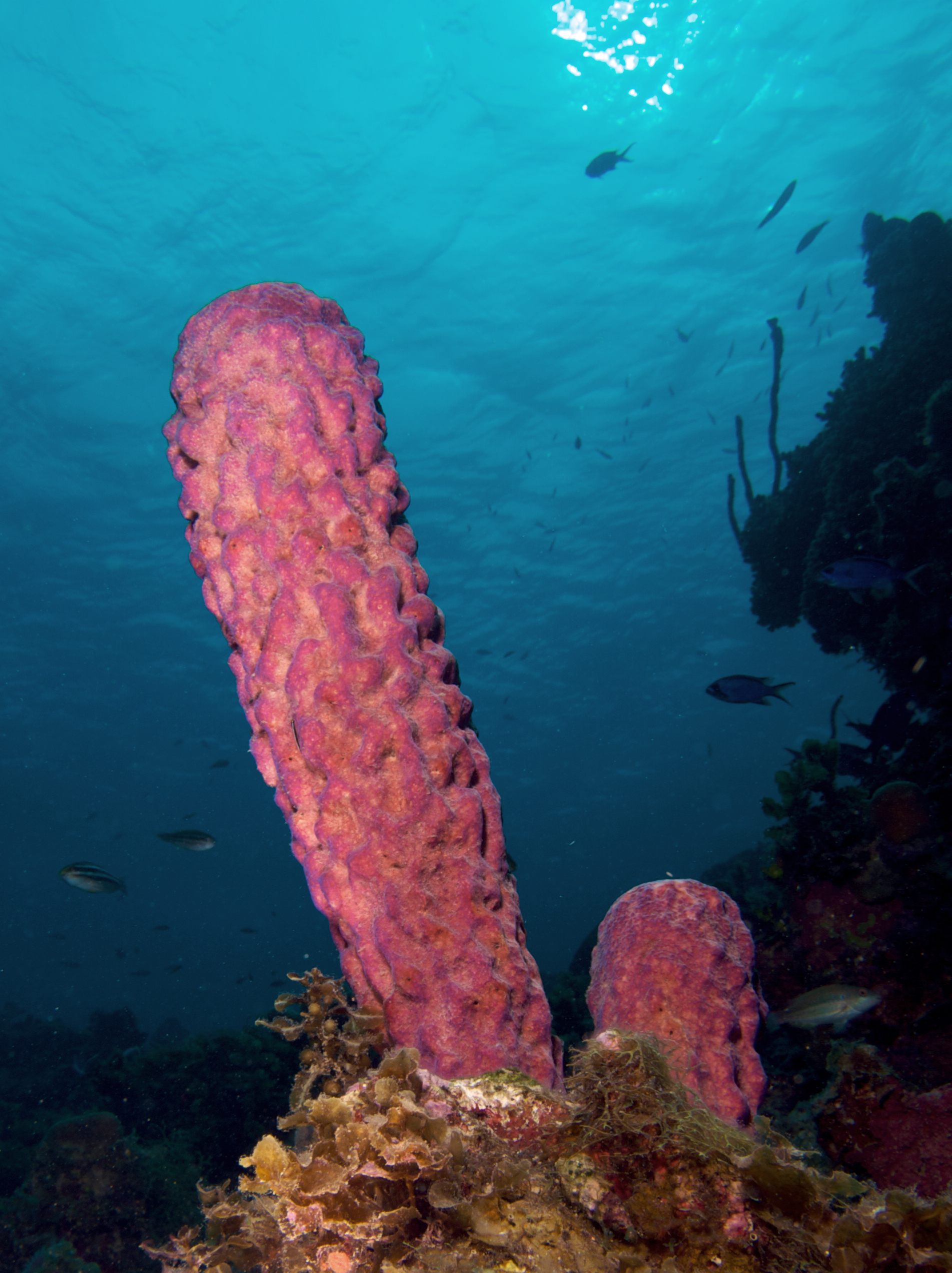
- Aplysina archeri

Scientific classification
- Domain: Eukaryota
- Kingdom: Animalia
- Phylum: Porifera
- Class: Demospongiae
- Subclass: Verongimorpha
- Order: Verongiida; Bergquist, 1978

Families
- Aplysinellidae; Aplysinidae; Ernstillidae; Ianthellidae; Pseudoceratinidae

= Verongiida =

Order of sponges

Verongiida (also known as Verongida) is an order of sea sponges within the phylum Porifera. The "skeleton" in these sponges is made up of spongin, rather than of spicules. They live in marine environments. The name was proposed by Patricia Bergquist in 1978.
