= Pipestela occidentalis =

Scientific classification
- Kingdom: Animalia
- Phylum: Porifera
- Class: Demospongiae
- Order: Axinellida
- Family: Axinellidae
- Genus: Pipestela
- Species: P. occidentalis

Binomial name
- Pipestela occidentalis Alvarez, Hooper & van Soest, 2008

Species of sponge

Holotype site

Pipestela occidentalis is a species of sponge belonging to the family Axinellidae.

The species was first described in 2008 from a specimen collected off the western shore of Barrow Island, Cape Poivre, Western Australia.

== Description ==
P. occidentalis is an orange, upright, tree-like sponge, 6.8 cm in height and 7.9 cm in width, with solid cylindrical branches. It is very like P. candelabra but the distribution is disjunct.
