= Pipestela hooperi =

Scientific classification
- Domain: Eukaryota
- Kingdom: Animalia
- Phylum: Porifera
- Class: Demospongiae
- Order: Axinellida
- Family: Axinellidae
- Genus: Pipestela
- Species: P. hooperi

Binomial name
- Pipestela hooperi (van Soest, Desqueyroux-Faúndez, Wright & König, 1996)

Synonyms
- Cymbastela hooperi van Soest, Desqueyroux-Faúndez, Wright & König, 1996

Species of sponge

Holotype site'"`UNIQ--ref-00000007-QINU`"'

Pipestela hooperi is a species of sponge belonging to the family Axinellidae.

The species was first described in 1996 by Rob van Soest and others as Cymbastela hooperi from a specimen collected from Kelso Reef in the Great Barrier Reef. The species epithet, hooperi, honours John Hooper.
