= Axinella badungensis =

Scientific classification
- Kingdom: Animalia
- Phylum: Porifera
- Class: Demospongiae
- Order: Axinellida
- Family: Axinellidae
- Genus: Axinella
- Species: A. badungensis

Binomial name
- Axinella badungensis Alvarez, de Voogd & van Soest, 2016

Species of sponge

Holotype

Axinella badungensis is a species of sponge in the family, Axinellidae, which was first described by Belinda Alvarez, Nicole de Voogd & Rob van Soest in 2016, found in the coastal waters of Badung Strait, Indonesia, (from which it takes its epithet, badungensis).
