= Pipestela rara =

Scientific classification
- Kingdom: Animalia
- Phylum: Porifera
- Class: Demospongiae
- Order: Axinellida
- Family: Axinellidae
- Genus: Pipestela
- Species: P. rara

Binomial name
- Pipestela rara Alvarez, Hooper & van Soest, 2008

Species of sponge

Holotype site

Pipestela rara is a species of sponge belonging to the family Axinellidae.

The species was first described in 2008.
