= Julavis jamaicensis =

Scientific classification
- Kingdom: Animalia
- Phylum: Porifera
- Class: Demospongiae
- Order: Axinellida
- Family: Heteroxyidae
- Genus: Julavis
- Species: J. jamaicensis

Binomial name
- Julavis jamaicensis van Soest & Lehnert, 1997

Species of sponge

Julavis jamaicensis is a species of sponge in the family Heteroxyidae.

== Taxonomy ==
The species was formally described by Rob W. M. van Soest and Helmut Lehnert in 1997. The holotype was collected off Montego Bay, Chalet Caribe, Jamaica. Van Soest and Lehnert felt that the minor differences in morphology from Julavis levis was weak evidence on its own to support Julavis jamaicensis as a new species, but was sufficient when backed up by how far apart they were from each other.

== Description ==
Julavis jamaicensis has a light orange to beige color. The holotype is around 1 millimeter thick, and a later specimen has a thickness of 0.2 to 0.4 millimeters.

The species differs from J. levis mainly in the spicules. The acanthostrongyles (large, spiny, two-ended spicules with blunt ends) form a row, are shorter, thicker, and do not curve as much as those of J. levis. The trichodragmas (bundles of small two-ended spicules) are also smaller.

== Habitat and distribution ==
The holotype was found encrusting on a deceased Ceratoporella nicholsoni (another species of sponge) in a cave at a depth of 20 meters. It has also been found encrusting on the sponge Chondrilla nucula near Discovery Bay, Jamaica, at a depth of 106 meters.
