= Pipestela terpenensis =

Scientific classification
- Domain: Eukaryota
- Kingdom: Animalia
- Phylum: Porifera
- Class: Demospongiae
- Order: Axinellida
- Family: Axinellidae
- Genus: Pipestela
- Species: P. terpenensis

Binomial name
- Pipestela terpenensis (Fromont, 1993)

Synonyms
- Amphimedon terpenensis Fromont, 1993; Cymbastela terpenensis (Fromont, 1993)

Species of sponge

Holotype site'"`UNIQ--ref-00000007-QINU`"'

Pipestela terpenensis is a species of sponge belonging to the family Axinellidae.

The species was first described in 1993 by Jane Fromont as Amphimedon terpenensis from a specimen collected at a depth of 19 m on MacGillivray Reef, Lizard Island in the Great Barrier Reef. The species epithet, terpenensis, was given because of the large proportion of terpenes in this sponge.

== Description ==
P. terpenensis is a red-brown sponge with a thin maroon band due partially to the sponge's pigment but also to a symbiont cyanobacteria. It is tall and sometimes the branches look like flattened organ pipes.

== Habitat ==
It grows on reefs in full light, on dead coral or rock at depths of 10 to 20.
