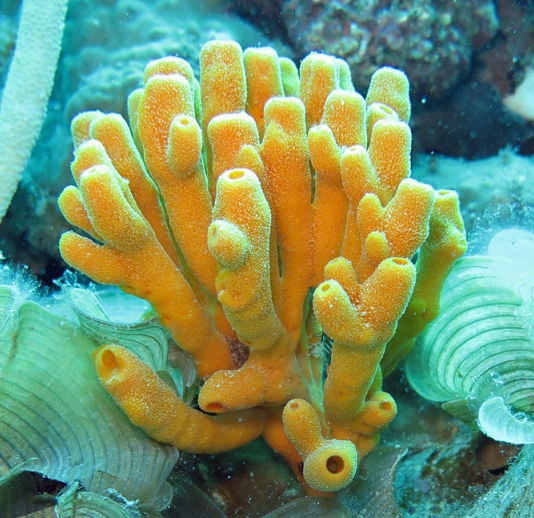
- Pipestela candelabra

Scientific classification
- Kingdom: Animalia
- Phylum: Porifera
- Class: Demospongiae
- Order: Axinellida
- Family: Axinellidae
- Genus: Pipestela; Alvarez, Hooper & van Soest, 2008

Type species
- Pipestela candelabra Alvarez, Hooper & van Soest, 2008

Species
- 5 species (see text)

= Pipestela =

Genus of sponge

Pipestela is a genus of sponges belonging to the family Axinellidae. The species of this genus are found in Australian waters, New Guinea and other countries to the north of Australia.

The genus was first described in 2008.

== Species ==
This genus contains the following five species:

- Pipestela candelabra Alvarez, Hooper & van Soest, 2008
- Pipestela hooperi (van Soest, Desqueyroux-Faúndez, Wright & König, 1996)
- Pipestela occidentalis Alvarez, Hooper & van Soest, 2008
- Pipestela rara Alvarez, Hooper & van Soest, 2008
- Pipestela terpenensis (Fromont, 1993)
