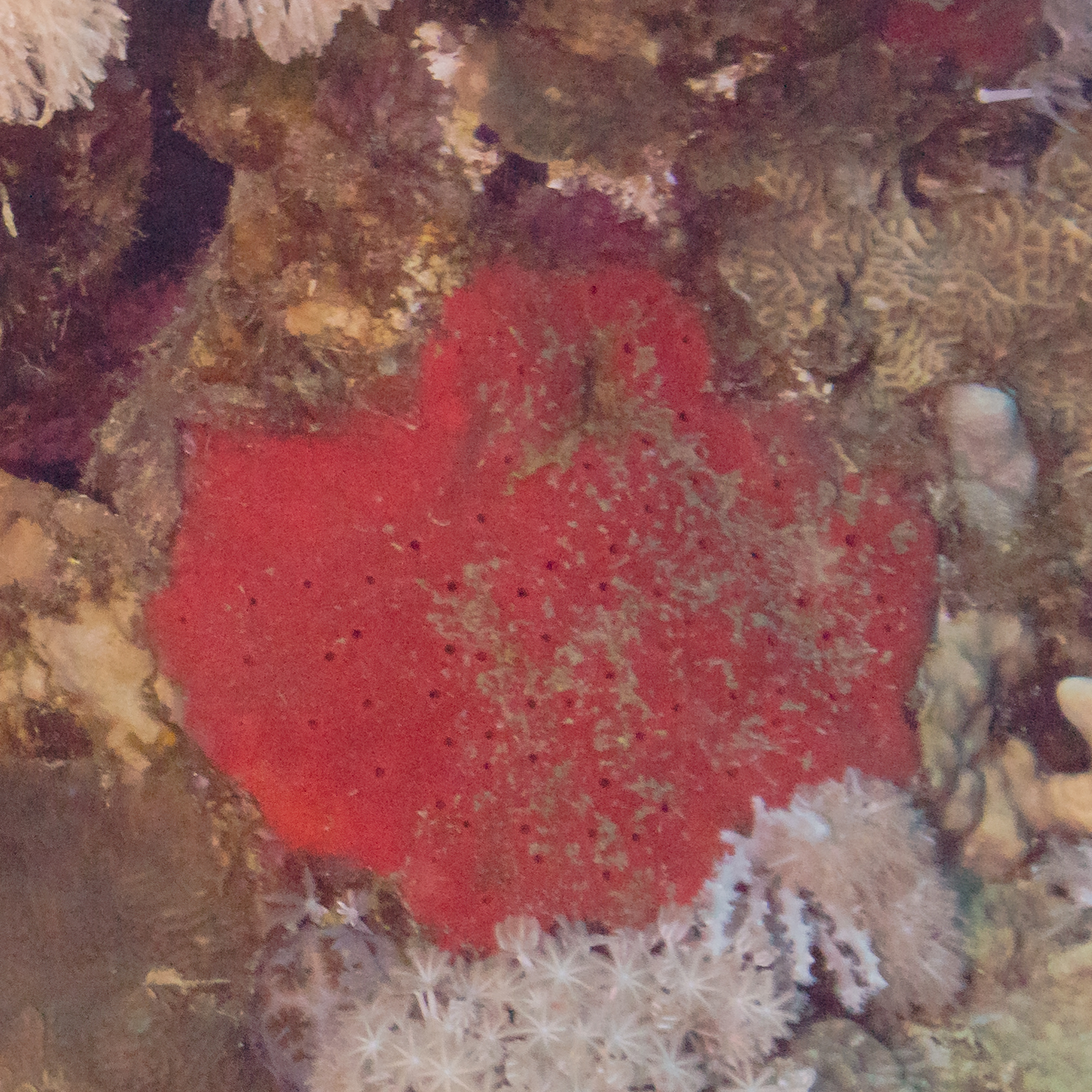

Scientific classification
- Domain: Eukaryota
- Kingdom: Animalia
- Phylum: Porifera
- Class: Demospongiae
- Order: Axinellida
- Family: Axinellidae
- Genus: Dragmacidon
- Species: D. lunaecharta

Binomial name
- Dragmacidon lunaecharta (Ridley & Dendy, 1886)

Synonyms
- List: Axinella lunaecharta Ridley & Dendy, 1886; Pseudaxinella lunaecharta (Ridley & Dendy, 1886)

= Dragmacidon lunaecharta =

Species of sponge

Dragmacidon lunaecharta, also known as the red ball sponge or red boring sponge, is a species of sea sponge found in the western Atlantic Ocean. It feeds on plankton. These sponges do not attach themselves to rocks or the sea floor but drift in water currents. Its main predators are sea slugs. It has been kept in home aquariums.

== Taxonomy ==
It was first described in 1886 by Stuart Oliver Ridley and Arthur Dendy as Axinella lunaecharta, but in 1887, in their final report, they transferred it to the genus, Pseudaxinella. In 1917, E.F. Hallman revised some genera in the family, Axinellidae, and transferred it to the genus, Dragmacidon.
