= Phycopsis =

Phycopsis may refer to:

- Phycopsis (sponge), a genus of sponges in the family Axinellidae
- Phycopsis, a genus of fungi in the family Seuratiaceae, synonym of Seuratia
- Drosera subg. Phycopsis or Drosera sect. Phycopsis, a group of plants in the genus Drosera (Droseraceae)
