= Axinella loribellae =

Scientific classification
- Kingdom: Animalia
- Phylum: Porifera
- Class: Demospongiae
- Order: Axinellida
- Family: Axinellidae
- Genus: Axinella
- Species: A. loribellae

Binomial name
- Axinella loribellae Alvarez & Hooper, 2009

Species of sponge

Axinella loribellae is a species of sponge in the family, Axinellidae, which was first described by Belinda Alvarez and John Hooper in 2009. It is found in the waters off Northern Australia in the IMCRA Northern Shelf province.
