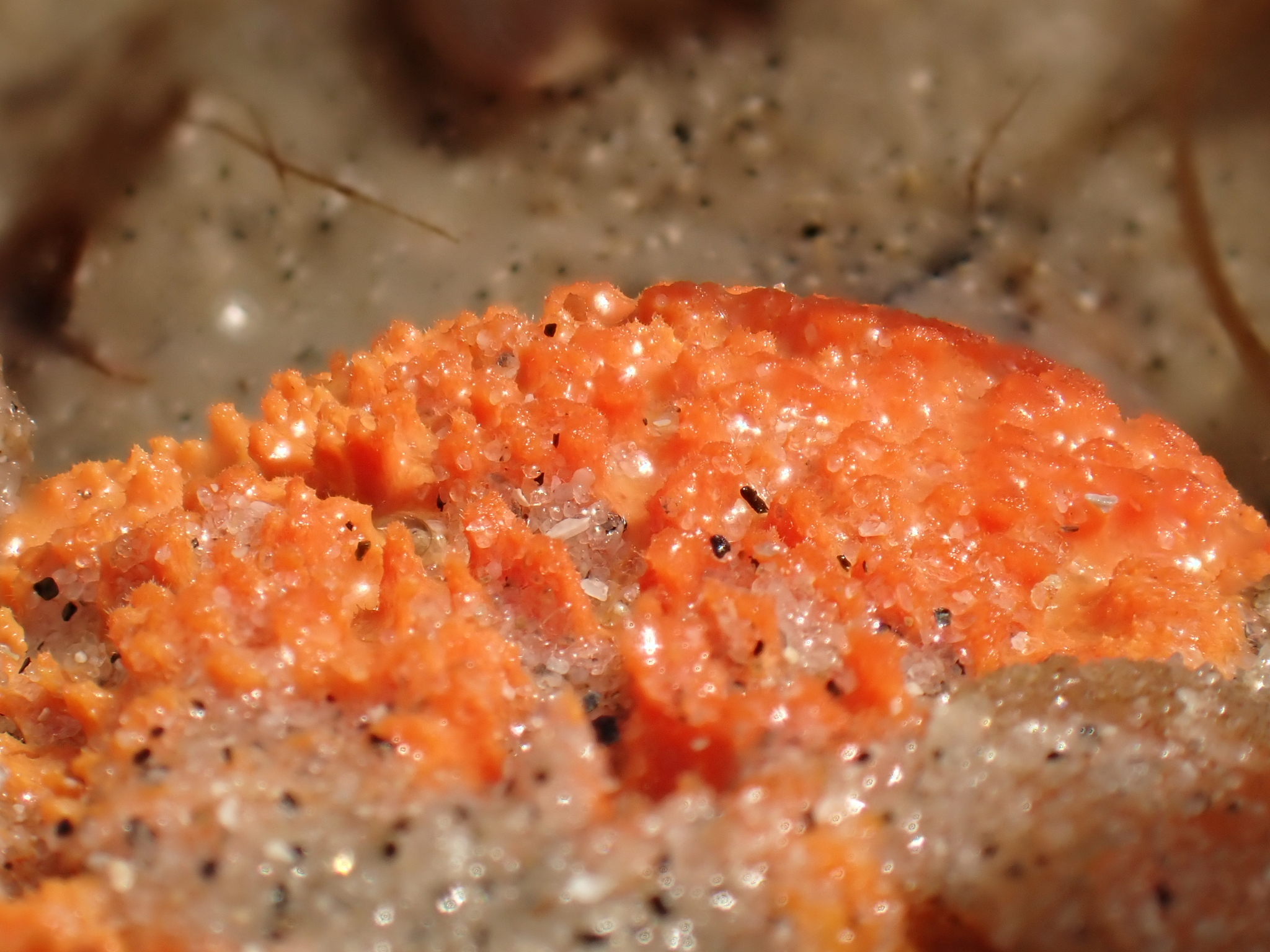

Scientific classification
- Kingdom: Animalia
- Phylum: Porifera
- Class: Demospongiae
- Order: Axinellida
- Family: Raspailiidae
- Genus: Endectyon
- Species: E. hispitumulus

Binomial name
- Endectyon hispitumulus Turner & Pankey, 2023

= Endectyon hispitumulus =

Species of sponges

Endectyon hispitumulus, also known as bristly mound fields, is a species of marine sponge in the family Raspailiidae. It is found in the intertidal and subtidal zones of the eastern Pacific Ocean.

== Description ==
Endectyon hispitumulus is a thinly encrusting sponge that is an orange-red color when it is alive. It has a distinctive morphology, evoking a field of hills or mounds. The mounds are hairy and have a smooth membrane between them.

== Distribution ==
Endectyon hispitumulus can be found as far north as Santa Cruz, California, and as far south as Loreto, Baja California Sur. The holotype was recorded at Coal Oil Point in Santa Barbara, California. The sponge is common in shady intertidal crevices, but also grows in the open, partially buried in sand.

== Ecology ==
Like other sponges, bristly mound fields are filter feeders.

== Etymology ==
The specific epithet derives from the Latin hispidus (bristled) and tumulus (mound).
