= Dragmacidon australe =

Scientific classification
- Domain: Eukaryota
- Kingdom: Animalia
- Phylum: Porifera
- Class: Demospongiae
- Order: Axinellida
- Family: Axinellidae
- Genus: Dragmacidon
- Species: D. australe

Binomial name
- Dragmacidon australe (Bergquist, 1970)

Synonyms
- Pseudaxinella australis Bergquist, 1970

Species of sponge

Dragmacidon australe is a species of sponge in the family, Axinellidae.

It was first described in 1970 by Patricia Bergquist as Pseudaxinella australis It was appears to have been transferred to the genus, Dragmacidon, in 2002, by Belinda Alvarez and John Hooper (but the transfer may have occurred in 2000).
