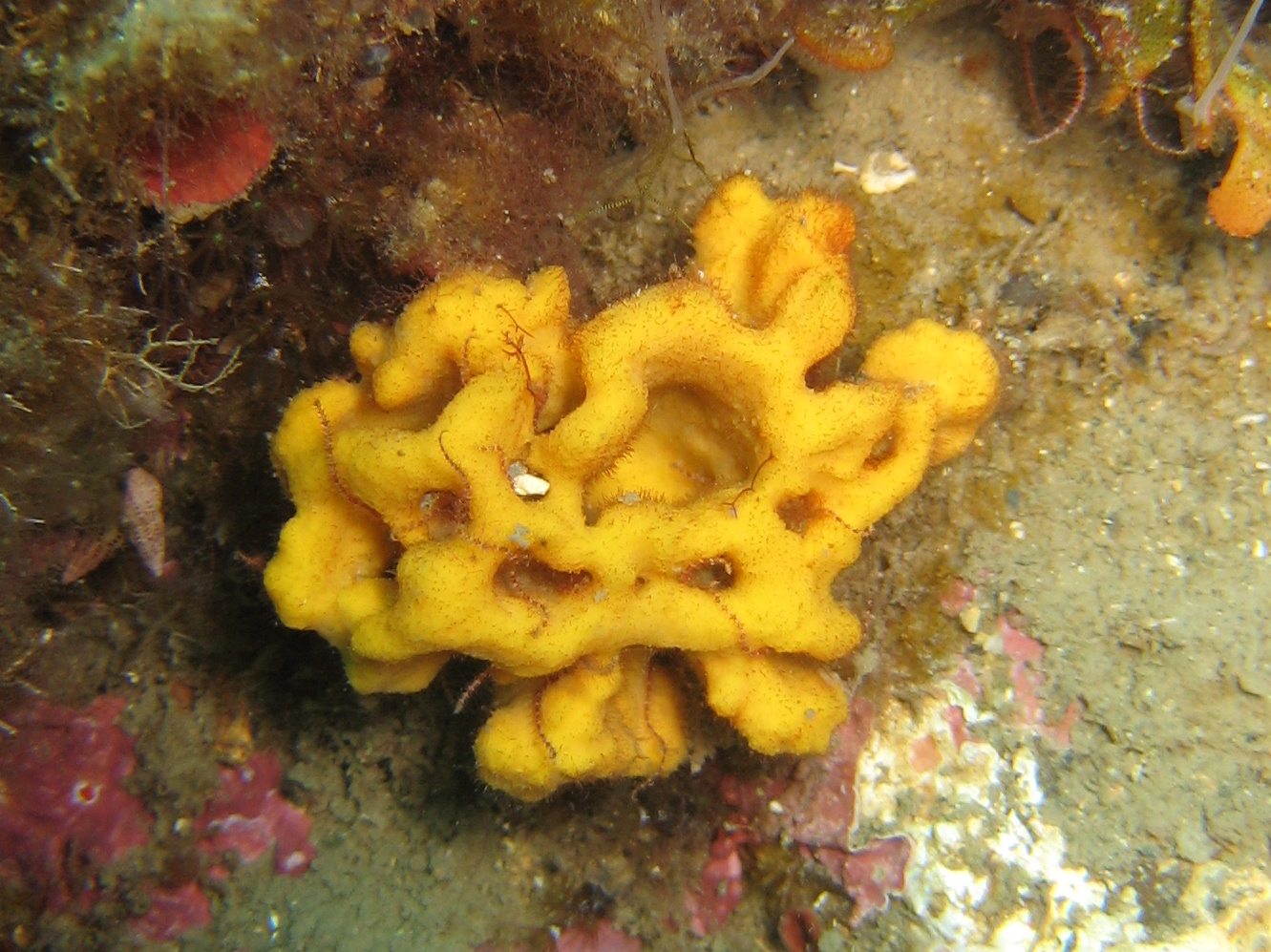

Scientific classification
- Domain: Eukaryota
- Kingdom: Animalia
- Phylum: Porifera
- Class: Demospongiae
- Order: Axinellida
- Family: Axinellidae
- Genus: Axinella
- Species: A. damicornis

Binomial name
- Axinella damicornis (Esper, 1794)

Synonyms
- Spongia damicornis Esper, 1794

= Axinella damicornis =

Species of sponge

Axinella damicornis, known as yellow sponge and crumpled duster sponge, is a marine sponge in the family Axinellidae, first described by Eugenius Johann Christoph Esper in 1794 as Spongia damicornis. It occurs in the Mediterranean Sea and North Atlantic, generally found at depths up to 120 m (390 ft), but has also been found much deeper.
