= Hemiasterellidae =

Scientific classification
- Domain: Eukaryota
- Kingdom: Animalia
- Phylum: Porifera
- Class: Demospongiae
- Order: Tethyida
- Family: Hemiasterellidae

Family of sponges

Hemiasterellidae is a family of sponges belonging to the order Tethyida.

Genera:

- Adreus Gray, 1867
- Axos Gray, 1867
- Galaxia Turner, 2020
- Hemiasterella Carter, 1879
- Leptosastra Topsent, 1904
- Liosina Thiele, 1899
- Paratimea
- Stelligera
