= Ptilocaulis =

Scientific classification
- Domain: Eukaryota
- Kingdom: Animalia
- Phylum: Porifera
- Class: Demospongiae
- Order: Axinellida
- Family: Axinellidae
- Genus: Ptilocaulis; Carter, 1883

Species
- See list

Genus of sponges

Ptilocaulis is a genus of demosponges. The species within this genus are usually red or orange. They are often called tree sponges, as they grow many branches from a single stem resembling trees. They can grow to large size.

== Species ==
The following species are included in the genus Ptilocaulis:

- Ptilocaulis aulopora (Schmidt, 1870)
- Ptilocaulis bistyla (Hechtel, 1983)
- Ptilocaulis braziliensis (Hechtel, 1983)
- Ptilocaulis digitatus Topsent, 1928
- Ptilocaulis echidnaeus (Lamarck, 1814)
- Ptilocaulis fosteri (Hechtel, 1983)
- Ptilocaulis marquezii (Duchassaing & Michelotti, 1864)
- Ptilocaulis spiculifer (Lamarck, 1814)
- Ptilocaulis walpersii (Duchassaing & Michelotti, 1864)
