= Plenaster =

Scientific classification
- Domain: Eukaryota
- Kingdom: Animalia
- Phylum: Porifera
- Class: Demospongiae
- Order: Axinellida
- Family: Stelligeridae
- Genus: Plenaster; Lim & Wiklund, 2017
- Species: P. craigi

Binomial name
- Plenaster craigi Lim & Wiklund, 2017

Genus of sponges

Plenaster is a monotypic genus of sponges in the family Stelligeridae. Plenaster craigi is the sole species. It lives on rocks on the Pacific Ocean seafloor.

Plenaster craigi have been named after the star like skeletal spicules inside their bodies.
