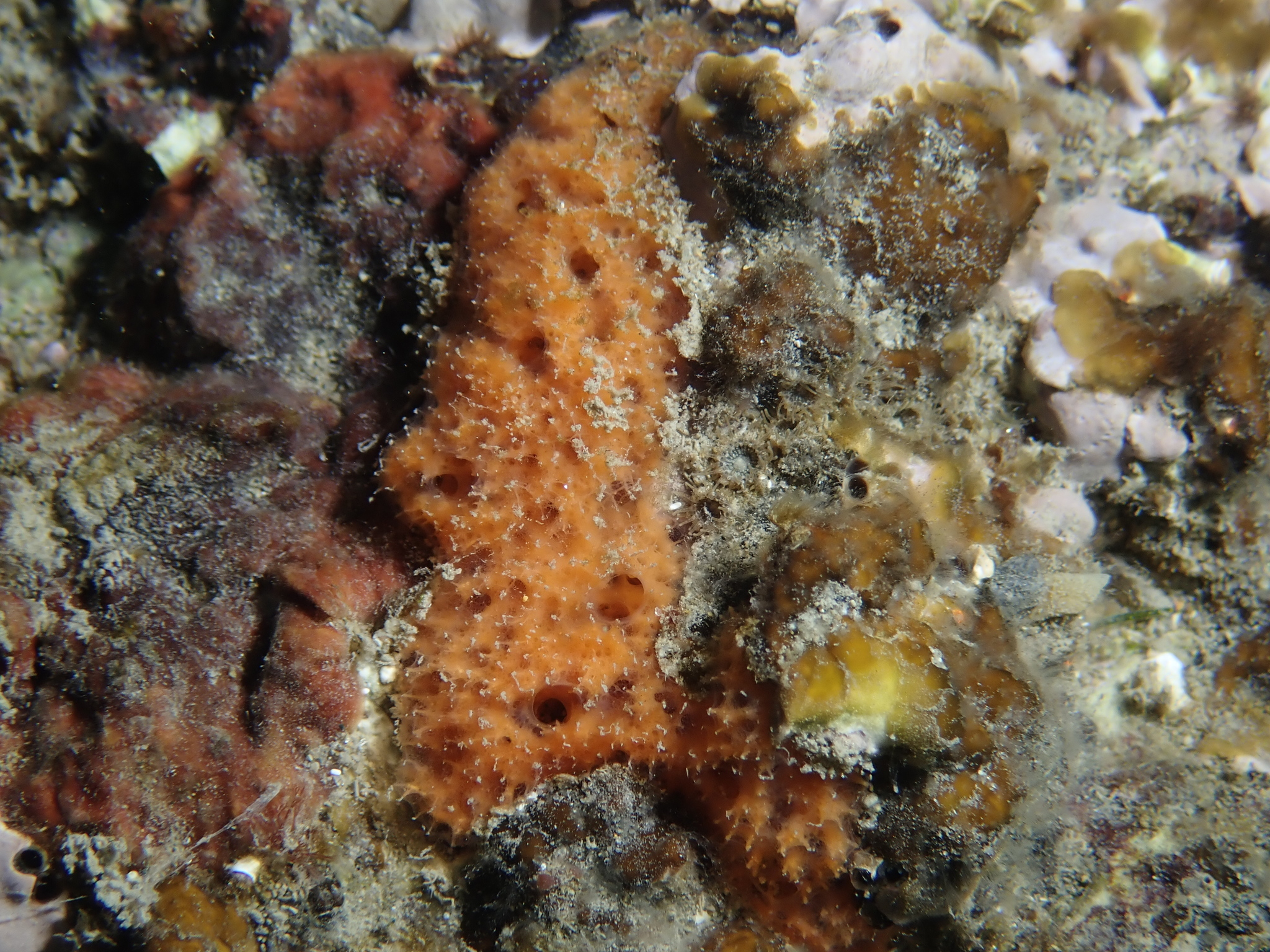
- Halicnemia gallica

Scientific classification
- Kingdom: Animalia
- Phylum: Porifera
- Class: Demospongiae
- Order: Axinellida
- Family: Stelligeridae
- Genus: Halicnemia; Bowerbank, 1864

= Halicnemia =

Genus of sponges

Halicnemia is a genus of sponges belonging to the family Stelligeridae.

The species of this genus are found worldwide.

Species:

- Halicnemia arcuata (Higgin, 1877)
- Halicnemia caledoniensis Morrow, 2019
- Halicnemia diazae Desqueyroux-Faúndez & van Soest, 1997
- Halicnemia gallica (Topsent, 1893)
- Halicnemia geniculata Sarà, 1958
- Halicnemia litorea Turner & Pankey, 2023
- Halicnemia montereyensis Turner & Pankey, 2023
- Halicnemia papillosa (Thiele, 1905)
- Halicnemia patera Bowerbank, 1864
- Halicnemia salomonensis Dendy, 1922
- Halicnemia verticillata (Bowerbank, 1866)
- Halicnemia wagini Morozov, Sabirov & Anisimova, 2018
- Halicnemia weltoni Turner & Pankey, 2023
