= Higginsia =

Scientific classification
- Domain: Eukaryota
- Kingdom: Animalia
- Phylum: Porifera
- Class: Demospongiae
- Order: Axinellida
- Family: Stelligeridae
- Genus: Higginsia; Higgin, 1877

Synonyms
- List: Allantella Hallmann, 1917; Dendropsis Ridley & Dendy, 1886

Genus of sponges

Higginsia is a genus of sea sponges belonging to the order Axinellida.

It is named for Henry Higgins (1814–1893), a British botanist and clergyman.

== Species ==
The following species are recognised in the genus Higginsia:

- Higginsia arborea (Keller, 1891)
- Higginsia bidentifera (Ridley & Dendy, 1886)
- Higginsia ciccaresei Pansini & Pesce, 1998
- Higginsia coralloides Higgin, 1877
- Higginsia higgini Dendy, 1922
- Higginsia higginissima Dickinson, 1945
- Higginsia kenyensis Pulitzer-Finali, 1993
- Higginsia lamella Pulitzer-Finali, 1993
- Higginsia massalis Carter, 1885
- Higginsia mediterranea Pulitzer-Finali, 1978
- Higginsia mixta (Hentschel, 1912)
- Higginsia natalensis Carter, 1885
- Higginsia palmata Pulitzer-Finali, 1996
- Higginsia petrosioides Dendy, 1922
- Higginsia pulcherrima Pulitzer-Finali, 1993
- Higginsia pumila (Keller, 1889)
- Higginsia pyriformis Brøndsted, 1916
- Higginsia robusta Burton, 1959
- Higginsia scabra Whitelegge, 1907
- Higginsia strigilata (Lamarck, 1814)
- Higginsia tanekea Hooper & Lévi, 1993
- Higginsia tethyoides Lévi, 1960
- Higginsia thielei Topsent, 1898
