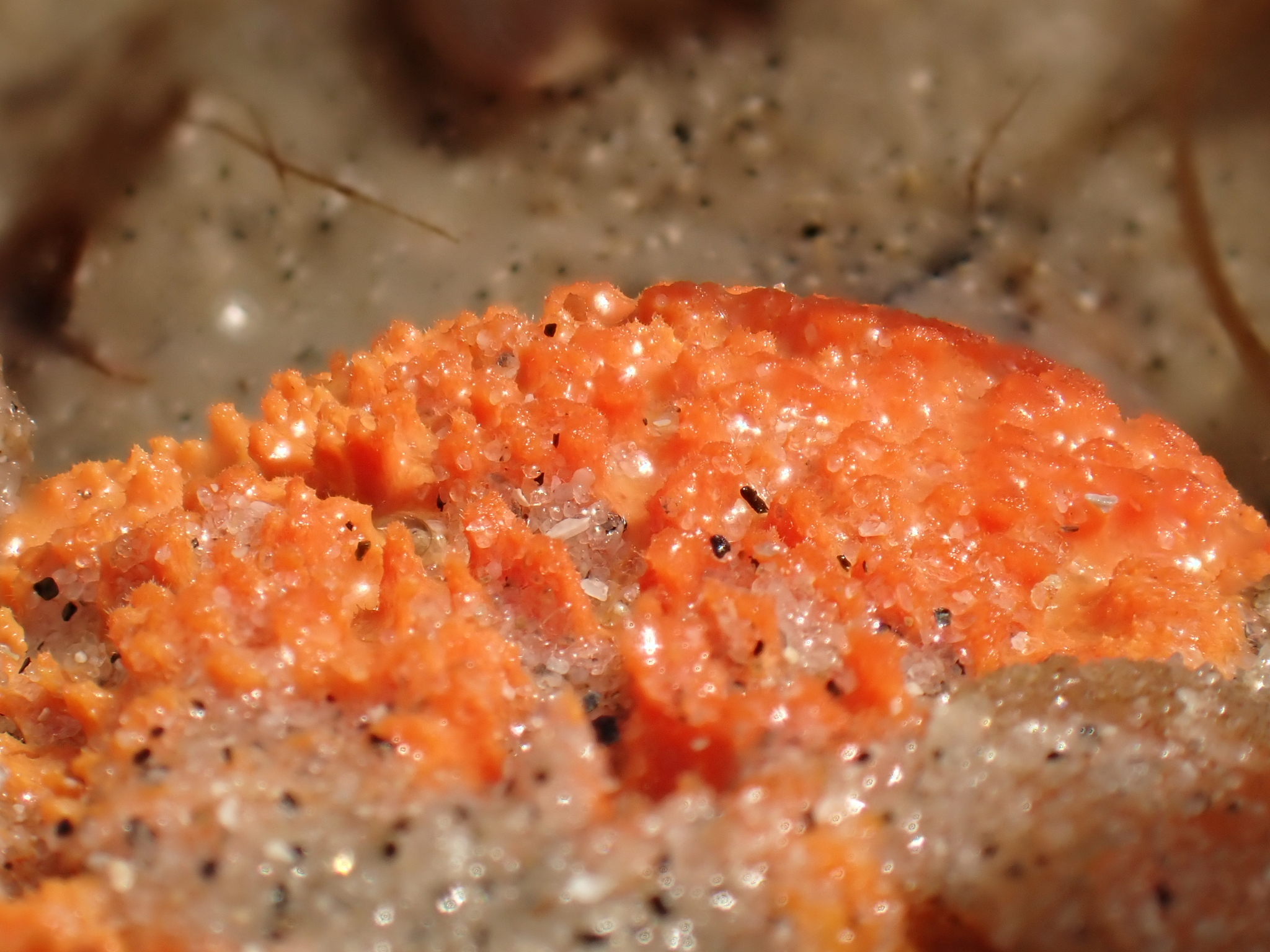
- Endectyon hispitumulus, Monterey, CA

Scientific classification
- Kingdom: Animalia
- Phylum: Porifera
- Class: Demospongiae
- Order: Axinellida
- Family: Raspailiidae
- Genus: Endectyon; Topsent, 1920

= Endectyon =

Genus of sponges

Endectyon is a genus of marine demosponges in the family Raspailiidae.

== Taxonomy ==
Endectyon is organized into two subgenera, Endectyon and Hemectyon, distinguished mainly by skeletal architecture and spicule morphology. Species in the subgenus Endectyon include the following:

- Endectyon delaubenfelsi Burton, 1930
- Endectyon elyakovi Hooper, 1991
- Endectyon fruticosum (Dendy, 1887)
- Endectyon hispitumulus Turner & Pankey, 2023
- Endectyon hornelli (Dendy, 1905)
- Endectyon hyle (de Laubenfels, 1930)
- Endectyon lacazei (Topsent, 1892)
- Endectyon lamellosum Thomas, 1976
- Endectyon multidentatum (Burton, 1948)
- Endectyon pilosum (Vacelet, 1961)
- Endectyon tenax (Schmidt, 1870)
- Endectyon thurstoni (Dendy, 1887)
- Endectyon xerampelinum (Lamarck, 1814)

Species in the subgenus Hemectyon include the following:

- Endectyon filiforme Sitja & Maldonado, 2014
- Endectyon hamatum (Schmidt, 1870)

The species Endectyon gorgonioides (Kirkpatrick, 1903) has not been assigned a subgenus.
