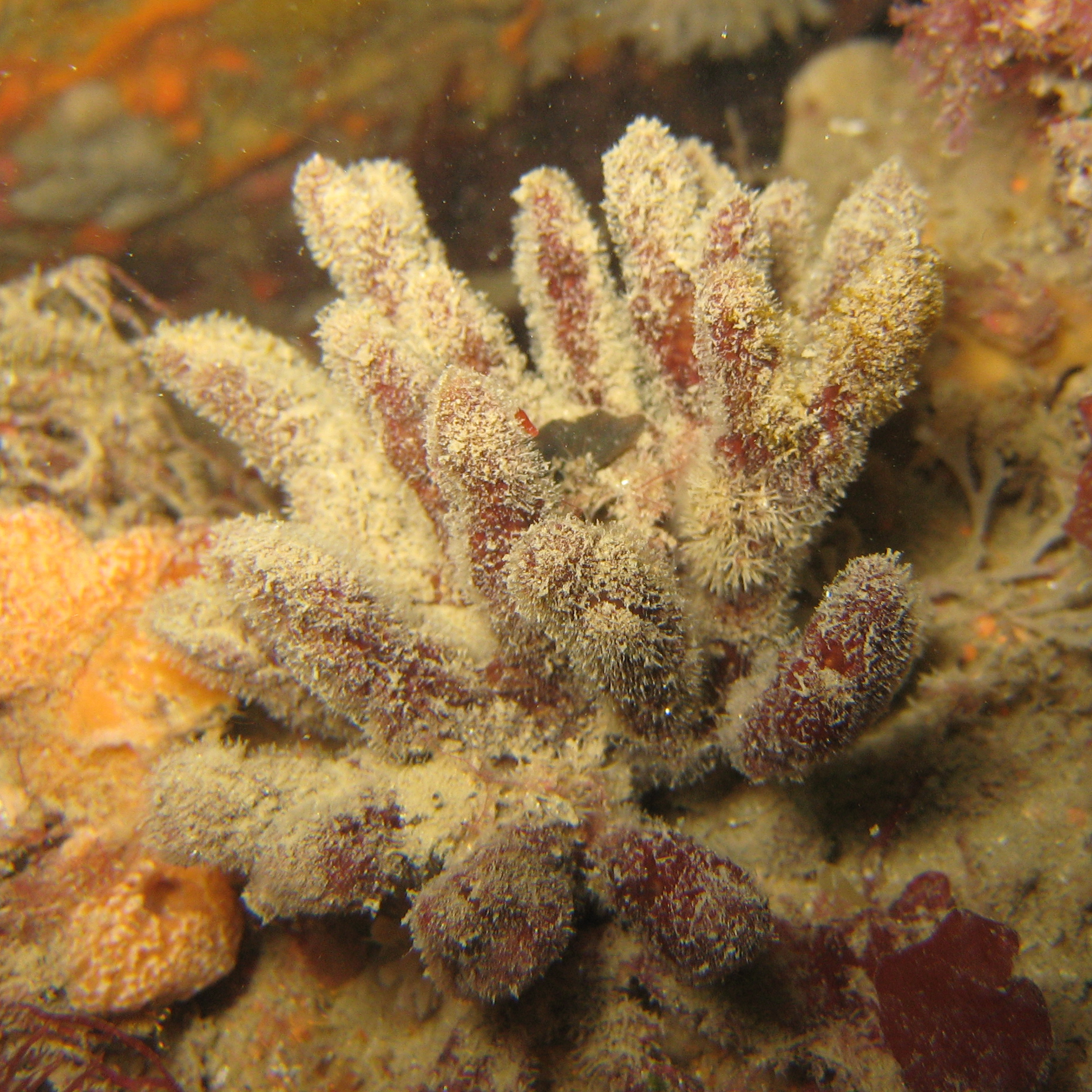
- Raspailia ramosa

Scientific classification
- Kingdom: Animalia
- Phylum: Porifera
- Class: Demospongiae
- Order: Axinellida
- Family: Raspailiidae
- Genus: Raspailia; Nardo, 1833

Species
- See text

= Raspailia =

Genus of sponges

Raspailia is a genus of sponges in the class Demospongiae.

== Species ==
As of April 2025, the World Register of Marine Species accepted the following species:

- Raspailia acerata (Carter, 1887)
- Raspailia agnata (Topsent, 1896)
- Raspailia alces Pick, 1905
- Raspailia anastomosa Kumar, 1925
- Raspailia arbuscula (Lendenfeld, 1888)
- Raspailia atropurpurea (Carter, 1885)
- Raspailia bathyalis Boury-Esnault, Pansini & Uriz, 1994
- Raspailia bifurcata Ridley, 1884
- Raspailia bonsai Recinos, Cavalcanti, Hajdu & Pinheiro, 2025
- Raspailia bouryesnaultae Lerner, Carraro & van Soest, 2006
- Raspailia cacticutis (Carter, 1885)
- Raspailia cervicornis (Burton, 1948)
- Raspailia clathrata Ridley, 1884
- Raspailia clathrioides (Lévi, 1967)
- Raspailia colorans Pulitzer-Finali, 1993
- Raspailia compressa Bergquist, 1970
- Raspailia darwinensis Hooper, 1991
- Raspailia desmoxyiformis Hooper, 1991
- Raspailia echinata Whitelegge, 1907
- Raspailia elegans (Lendenfeld, 1887)
- Raspailia estilingue Recinos, Cavalcanti, Hajdu & Pinheiro, 2025
- Raspailia falcifera Topsent, 1890
- Raspailia flaccida Bergquist, 1970
- Raspailia folium Thiele, 1898
- Raspailia frondosa Ekins, Debitus, Erpenbeck & Hooper, 2018
- Raspailia frondula (Whitelegge, 1907)
- Raspailia fueguensis Cuartas, 1994
- Raspailia galapagensis (Desqueyroux-Faúndez & van Soest, 1997)
- Raspailia gracilis (Lendenfeld, 1888)
- Raspailia gracillima Topsent, 1894
- Raspailia hentscheli Van Soest & Hooper, 2020
- Raspailia hirsuta Thiele, 1898
- Raspailia hispida (Montagu, 1814)
- Raspailia howsei (Bowerbank, 1866)
- Raspailia humilis Topsent, 1892
- Raspailia hymani (Dickinson, 1945)
- Raspailia inaequalis Dendy, 1924
- Raspailia irregularis (Lendenfeld, 1888)
- Raspailia kasumiensis Tanita, 1965
- Raspailia kennedyi Hooper, Sutcliffe & Schlacher-Hoenlinger, 2008
- Raspailia keriontria Hooper, 1991
- Raspailia konika Recinos, Cavalcanti, Hajdu & Pinheiro, 2025
- Raspailia koreana Rho & Sim, 1979
- Raspailia laciniata (Carter, 1879)
- Raspailia leblanci Recinos, Cavalcanti, Hajdu & Pinheiro, 2025
- Raspailia levis Cuartas, 1994
- Raspailia longispicula Breitfuss, 1912
- Raspailia mariana (Ridley & Dendy, 1886)
- Raspailia melanorhops HooMarion? Brassnetper, 1991
- Raspailia microacanthoxea Hoshino, 1976
- Raspailia muricyana Moraes, 2011
- Raspailia nuda Hentschel, 1911
- Raspailia pacifica (Koltun, 1962)
- Raspailia paradoxa Hentschel, 1911
- Raspailia pearsei (Wells, Wells & Gray, 1960)
- Raspailia phakellina (Topsent, 1913)
- Raspailia phakellopsis Hooper, 1991
- Raspailia pinnatifida (Carter, 1885)
- Raspailia radiosa (Bowerbank, 1866)
- Raspailia ramosa (Montagu, 1814)
- Raspailia reticulata Hooper, 1991
- Raspailia rigida Ridley & Dendy, 1886
- Raspailia rubra Aguilar-Camacho & Carballo, 2013
- Raspailia rubrum (Kirk, 1911)
- Raspailia scorpa Hooper, Sutcliffe & Schlacher-Hoenlinger, 2008
- Raspailia septentrionalis Lehnert & Stone, 2016
- Raspailia simplicior Pick, 1905
- Raspailia stelliderma (Carter, 1885)
- Raspailia tenella (Lendenfeld, 1888)
- Raspailia tenuis Ridley & Dendy, 1886
- Raspailia thamnopilosa Van Soest, 2017
- Raspailia topsenti Dendy, 1924
- Raspailia trachystyla Tanita, 1968
- Raspailia uncinata Pick, 1905
- Raspailia urizae Hooper, 2012
- Raspailia ventilabrum (Bowerbank, 1866)
- Raspailia vestigifera Dendy, 1896
- Raspailia viminalis Schmidt, 1862
- Raspailia virgultosa (Bowerbank, 1866)
- Raspailia wardi Hooper, 1991
- Raspailia wilkinsoni Hooper, 1991
