= Henry Higgins =

Henry Higgins may refer to:

- The fictional character: see Pygmalion (play), or My Fair Lady
- H. B. Higgins (1851–1929), Australian politician and judge
- Henry Higgins (botanist) (1814–1893), English botanist
- Henry Higgins (bullfighter) (1944–1978), English bullfighter

== See also ==
- Harry Higgins (1894–1979), English cricketer
- Henry Huggins, fictional character
