= Julavis =

Scientific classification
- Kingdom: Animalia
- Phylum: Porifera
- Class: Demospongiae
- Order: Axinellida
- Family: Heteroxyidae
- Genus: Julavis de Laubenfels, 1936

Type species
- Julavis levis (Kirkpatrick, 1900)

Genus of sponges

Julavis is a genus of sponges in the family Heteroxyidae. It contains three species, with Julavis levis as the type species. Species of this genus have a dense, matted surface which is made up of spiny strongyles (large, two-ended spicules with blunt tips).

== Species ==
Julavis contains the following species:

- Julavis borealis Lehnert, Rooney & Everett, 2026
- Julavis jamaicensis van Soest & Lehnert, 1997
- Julavis levis (Kirkpatrick, 1900)
