= Stelligera =

Stelligera may refer to:

- Stelligera (sponge), a genus of sponges in the family Stelligeridae
- Stelligera (plant), a genus of plants in the family Amaranthaceae
- Stelligera (fungus), a formerly recognized genus of fungi now included in the genus Lachnocladium
