= Dragmacidon =

Scientific classification
- Domain: Eukaryota
- Kingdom: Animalia
- Phylum: Porifera
- Class: Demospongiae
- Order: Axinellida
- Family: Axinellidae
- Genus: Dragmacidon; Hallmann, 1917

Species
- See text

Genus of sponges

Dragmacidon is a genus of sponges in the family Axinellidae, first described in 1917 by E.F.Hallman .

== List of species ==
- Dragmacidon agariciforme (Dendy, 1905)
- Dragmacidon alvarezae Zea & Pulido, 2016
- Dragmacidon australe (Bergquist, 1970)
- Dragmacidon clathriforme (Lendenfeld, 1888)
- Dragmacidon coccineum (Keller, 1891)
- Dragmacidon condylia (Hooper & Lévi, 1993)
- Dragmacidon debitusae (Hooper & Lévi, 1993)
- Dragmacidon decipiens (Wiedenmayer, 1989)
- Dragmacidon durissimum (Dendy, 1905)
- Dragmacidon egregium (Ridley, 1881)
- Dragmacidon fibrosum (Ridley & Dendy, 1886)
- Dragmacidon grayi (Wells, Wells & Gray., 1960)
- Dragmacidon incrustans (Whitelegge, 1897)
- Dragmacidon kishinense Austin, Ott, Reiswig, Romagosa & McDaniel, 2013
- Dragmacidon lunaecharta (Ridley & Dendy, 1886)
- Dragmacidon mexicanum (de Laubenfels, 1935)
- Dragmacidon mutans (Sarà, 1978)
- Dragmacidon ophisclera de Laubenfels, 1935
- Dragmacidon oxeon (Dickinson, 1945)
- Dragmacidon reticulatum (Ridley & Dendy, 1886)
- Dragmacidon sanguineum (Burton, 1933)
- Dragmacidon tuberosum Topsent, 1928
- Dragmacidon tumidum (Dendy, 1897)
