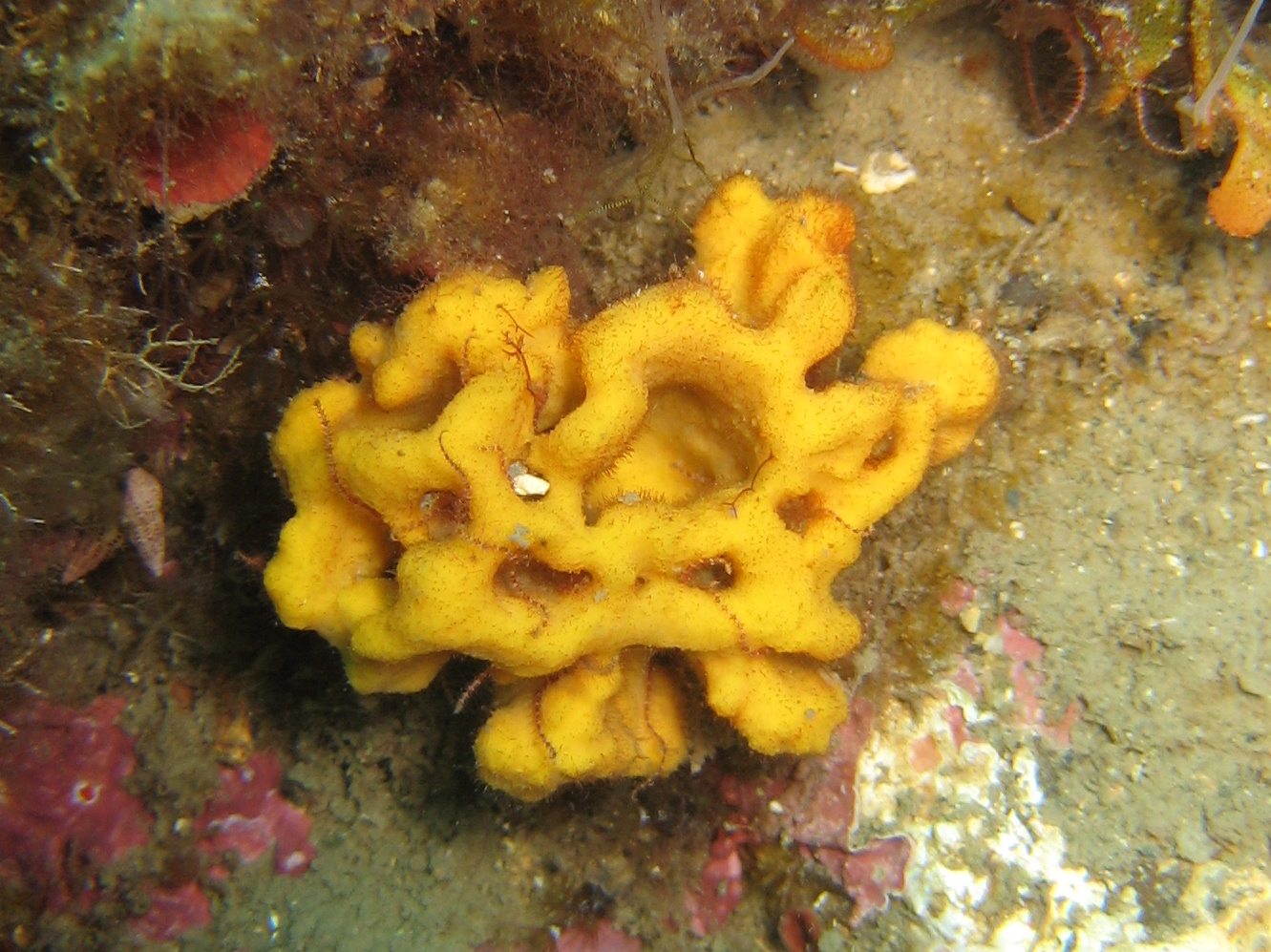
- Axinella damicornis

Scientific classification
- Kingdom: Animalia
- Phylum: Porifera
- Class: Demospongiae
- Order: Axinellida
- Family: Axinellidae
- Genus: Axinella; Schmidt, 1862

Species
- See text

Synonyms
- List: Axidragma Hallmann, 1917; Axinella (Homaxinella) Topsent, 1916; Axinella (Stylissa) Hallmann, 1914; Axinosia Hallmann, 1914; Chalinissa Lendenfeld, 1887; Pseudaxinella Schmidt, 1875; Querciclona Laubenfels, 1936; Teichaxinella Laubenfels, 1936; Tragosia Gray, 1867

= Axinella =

Genus of sponges

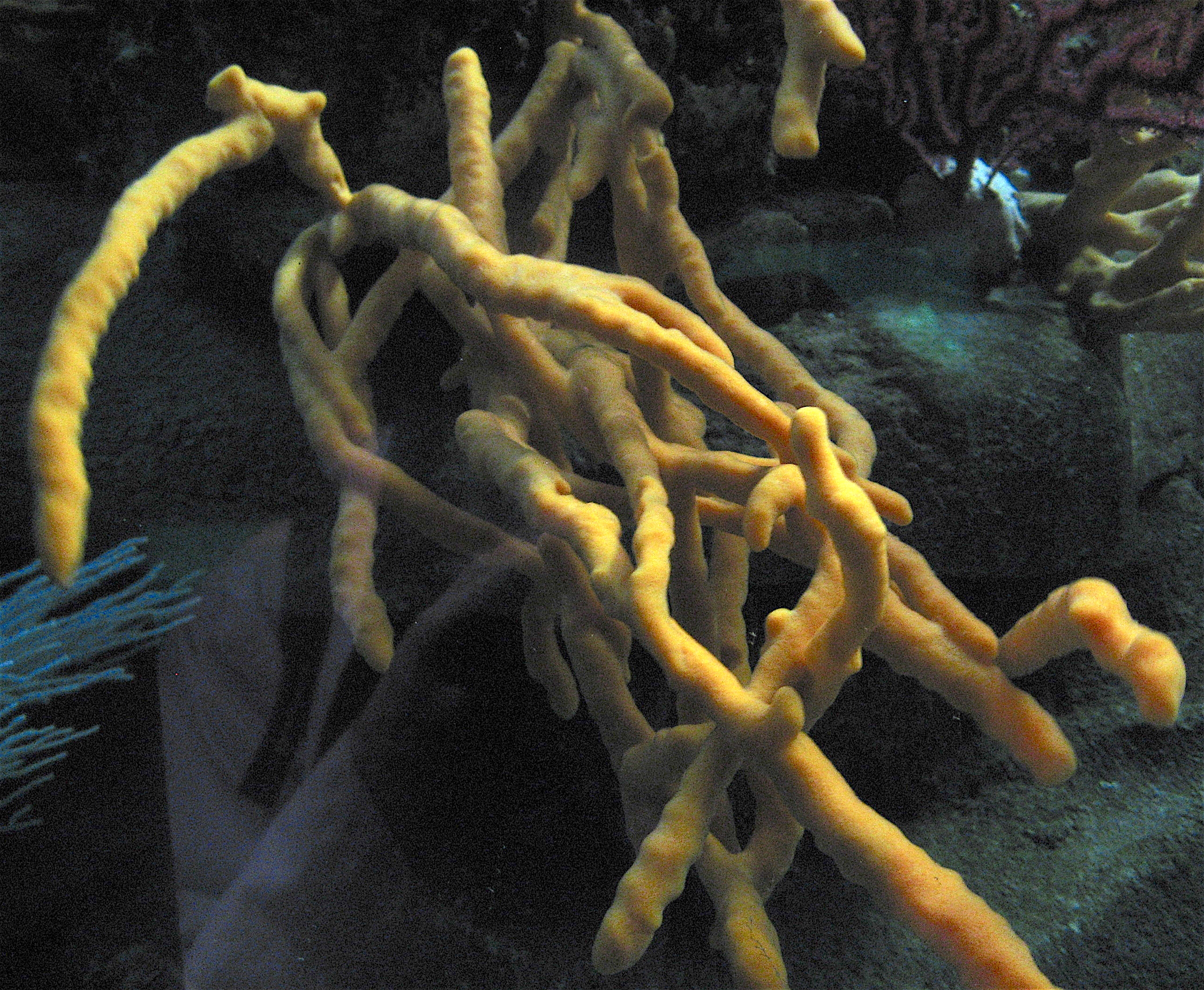
Axinella polypoides

Axinella is a genus of sponges in the family Axinellidae first described in 1862 by Eduard Oscar Schmidt. Species of the genus Axinella occur in the Indian and Pacific Oceans. Most of these sponges are smaller than 20 cm, and have a yellow or orange colour.

== List of species ==
The following species are recognized within the genus Axinella:

- Axinella acanthelloides Pattanayak, 2006
- Axinella alba (Descatoire, 1966)
- Axinella alborana Sitjà & Maldonado, 2014
- Axinella amorpha Tanita & Hoshino, 1989
- Axinella anamesa (de Laubenfels, 1957)
- Axinella antarctica (Koltun, 1964)
- Axinella arborescens Ridley & Dendy, 1886
- Axinella arctica (Vosmaer, 1885)
- Axinella aruensis (Hentschel, 1912)
- Axinella australiensis Bergquist, 1970
- Axinella babici Vacelet, 1961
- Axinella badungensis Alvarez, de Voogd & van Soest, 2016
- Axinella balinensis Alvarez, de Voogd & van Soest, 2016
- Axinella bidderi Burton, 1959
- Axinella blanca Koltun, 1959
- Axinella brevistyla (Hoshino, 1981)
- Axinella brondstedi Bergquist, 1970
- Axinella bubarinoides Dendy, 1922
- Axinella cannabina (Esper, 1794)
- Axinella centrotylota Pansini, 1984
- Axinella ceylonensis (Dendy, 1905)
- Axinella cinnamomea (Nardo, 1833)
- Axinella clathrata Dendy, 1897
- Axinella columna Sim, Kim & Byeon, 1990
- Axinella convexa Hoshino, 1981
- Axinella copiosa Thiele, 1898
- Axinella cornua Sim, Kim & Byeon, 1990
- Axinella coronata Bertolino, Costa & Pansini, 2020
- Axinella corrugata (George & Wilson, 1919)
- Axinella crassa (Carter, 1885)
- Axinella crinita Thiele, 1905
- Axinella cylindratus Hoshino, 1981
- Axinella cylindrica Bertolino, Costa & Pansini, 2020
- Axinella damicornis (Esper, 1794)
- Axinella digitiformis Lehnert & van Soest, 1996
- Axinella dissimilis (Bowerbank, 1866)
- Axinella donnani (Bowerbank, 1873)
- Axinella dragmaxioides Burton, 1959
- Axinella egregia sensu Topsent, 1892
- Axinella elegans (Dendy, 1924)
- Axinella estacioi Carballo & Garcia-Gomez, 1995
- Axinella flabelloreticulata Burton, 1959
- Axinella flustra Topsent, 1892
- Axinella globula Brøndsted, 1924
- Axinella guiteli Topsent, 1896
- Axinella halichondrioides Dendy, 1905
- Axinella hispida Koltun, 1959
- Axinella incrustans Thiele, 1898
- Axinella infundibuliformis (Linnaeus, 1759)
- Axinella kirki Dendy, 1897
- Axinella kurushima Van Soest, 2024
- Axinella labyrinthica Dendy, 1889
- Axinella lamellata (Dendy, 1905)
- Axinella lesueuri Topsent, 1932
- Axinella lifouensis Lévi & Lévi, 1983
- Axinella loribellae Alvarez & Hooper, 2009
- Axinella macrostyla Babiç, 1922
- Axinella mahonensis Ferrer-Hernandez, 1916
- Axinella manus Dendy, 1905
- Axinella massalis Burton, 1959
- Axinella meandroides Alvarez, van Soest & Rützler, 1998
- Axinella meloniformis Carter, 1885
- Axinella minor Thomas, 1981
- Axinella minuta Lévi, 1957
- Axinella natalensis (Kirkpatrick, 1903)
- Axinella nayaritensis Carballo, Bautista-Guerrero & Cruz-Barraza, 2018
- Axinella parva Picton & Goodwin, 2007
- Axinella perlucida Topsent, 1896
- Axinella pilifera Carter, 1885
- Axinella plumosa (Lévi & Lévi, 1983)
- Axinella polycapella de Laubenfels, 1953
- Axinella polypoides Schmidt, 1862
- Axinella pomponiae Alvarez, van Soest & Rützler, 1998
- Axinella profunda Ridley & Dendy, 1886
- Axinella proliferans Ridley, 1884
- Axinella pseudominuta Bibiloni, 1993
- Axinella pyramidata Stephens, 1916
- Axinella quercifolia (Keller, 1889)
- Axinella richardsoni Bergquist, 1970
- Axinella salicina Schmidt, 1868
- Axinella setosa Hentschel, 1929
- Axinella shoemakeri (de Laubenfels, 1936)
- Axinella sinoxea Alvarez & Hooper, 2009
- Axinella solenoeides de Laubenfels, 1957
- Axinella spatula Sitjà & Maldonado, 2014
- Axinella symbiotica Whitelegge, 1907
- Axinella tenuidigitata Dendy, 1905
- Axinella tenuis Thiele, 1898
- Axinella torquata Brøndsted, 1924
- Axinella trichophora Hentschel, 1929
- Axinella vaceleti Pansini, 1984
- Axinella vasonuda Topsent, 1904
- Axinella vellerea Topsent, 1904
- Axinella ventilabrum Burton, 1959
- Axinella venusta Idan, Shefer, Feldstein & Ilan, 2021
- Axinella vermiculata Whitelegge, 1907
- Axinella verrucosa (Esper, 1794)
- Axinella villosa Carter, 1885
- Axinella waltonsmithi (de Laubenfels, 1953)
- Axinella weltnerii (Lendenfeld, 1897)
