= Charles Longuet Higgins =

Physician and benefactor (1806–1885)

Charles Longuet Higgins (1806–1885) was an English landowner, physician and benefactor.

== Family background ==
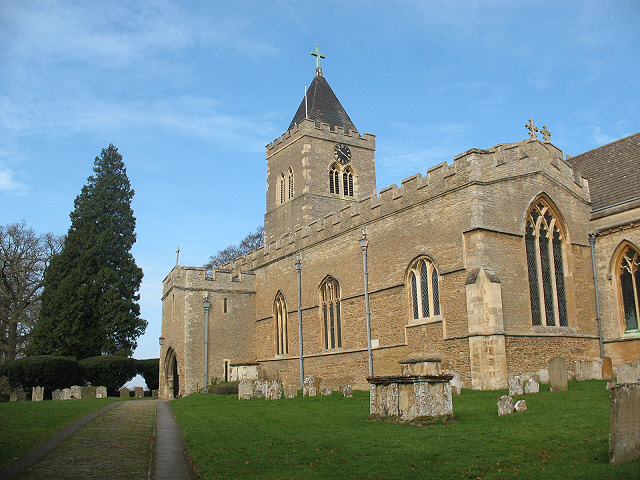
All Saints, Turvey, Bedfordshire

Turvey Abbey in Bedfordshire came into the Higgins family around 1787, when Charles Higgins, who served as Sheriff of London, bought the manor of Turvey from Charles Henry Mordaunt, 5th Earl of Peterborough. John Higgins, nephew to Charles Higgins, inherited it in 1792.

John Higgins was the son of Thomas Higgins (died 1794), brother to Charles Higgins and youngest of the five sons of John Higgins, and his wife Mary Parrott. William Cowper wrote a monumental inscription for Mary Higgins, who died in 1791; he was a neighbour of the Higgins family in Weston Underwood, Buckinghamshire from about 1786 to 1792. John Higgins drew a pencil portrait of Cowper, and also painted landscapes. He was High Sheriff of Bedfordshire in 1801.

== Life ==
The eldest son of John Higgins of Turvey Abbey, and Theresa, eldest daughter of Benjamin Longuet of Louth and Bath, Charles Longuet Higgins was born in his father's house on 30 November 1806. He received his early education at home, and matriculated as a pensioner of Trinity College, Cambridge on 14 November 1825. At Cambridge he came under the influence of Charles Simeon. He graduated B.A. in 1830, and M.A. in 1834.

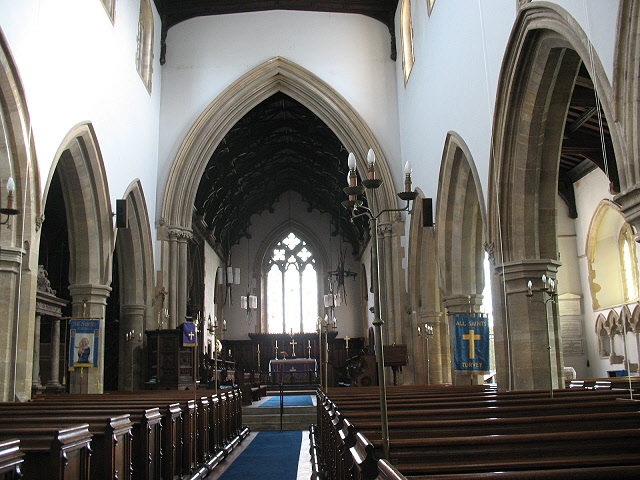
All Saints, Turvey, view from the nave

Higgins did not go into the Church, which was against his father's wishes. He was admitted a student of Lincoln's Inn on 16 November 1830, but was not called to the bar. From 1836 to 1838 he studied medicine in London, at St Bartholomew's Hospital, or St Thomas' Hospital.

Having qualified in medicine, Higgins carried on a general medical practice in Turvey. On the death of his father in 1846 he succeeded to the family property. He went on a five-month tour, with his brother Henry, in Egypt, Syria and Palestine, in 1848.

Higgins restored the parish church, where George Gilbert Scott designed the new chancel (1852–4). He built schools, a village museum, and cottages; and delivered lectures on natural history and other subjects.

Higgins was a Justice of the Peace and Deputy Lieutenant of Bedfordshire. In 1860 he was High Sheriff of Bedfordshire. He died without issue on 23 January 1885. John William Burgon, his brother-in-law, included a biography of Higgins in his Twelve Good Men (1888). With 11 clerics, Burgon highlighted him as "the good layman".

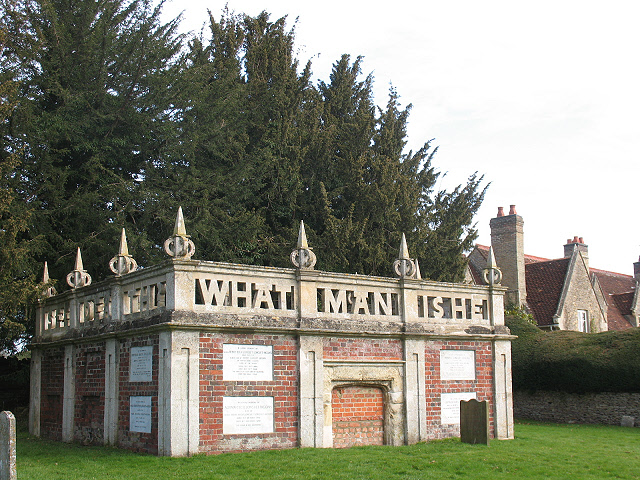
Higgins mausoleum at All Saints, Turvey

== Works ==
Higgins planned a hymn-book to be used universally in the Church of England. He read a paper on hymnology before the Church Congress in Nottingham in 1871, which was published. Clement considers that it shows the extent to which Higgins had moved from the evangelical views of his childhood and student days, towards a High Church position.

== Family ==
On 26 June 1853 Higgins married Helen Eliza Burgon, daughter of Thomas Burgon of the British Museum. The second son of John and Teresa Higgins was Henry Hugh Higgins, the botanist; Turvey Abbey was inherited by Henry Longuet Higgins, his eldest son and so nephew of Charles Longuet Higgins.

=== Family collections ===
Theresa Higgins bought numerous ethnographic exhibits at the 1806 sale of the Leverian Collection. Charles Longuet Higgins himself collected, from auctions in the 1850s, and created a village museum. In the 1860s he talked to a local society on the topic of the local, as opposed to the general museum; and he disposed of some of his collection, to Henry Christy, and possibly the British Museum, at this period. Henry Longuet Higgins made a sale of collected items in 1904. Some of the original Leverian lots certainly came finally to the British Museum; Kaeppler comments that exact accession routes remain opaque.

== Notes ==
Attribution

This article incorporates text from a publication now in the public domain: Stephen, Leslie; Lee, Sidney, eds. (1891). "Higgins, Charles Longuet". Dictionary of National Biography. Vol. 26. London: Smith, Elder & Co.
