= Hemiasterella =

Scientific classification
- Kingdom: Animalia
- Phylum: Porifera
- Class: Demospongiae
- Order: Tethyida
- Family: Hemiasterellidae
- Genus: Hemiasterella; Carter, 1879

Genus of sponges

Hemiasterella is a genus of sponges belonging to the family Hemiasterellidae.

The genus has almost cosmopolitan distribution.

Species:

- Hemiasterella affinis Carter, 1879
- Hemiasterella ajax (de Laubenfels, 1950)
- Hemiasterella aristoteliana Voultsiadou-Koukoura & van Soest, 1991
- Hemiasterella bouilloni (Thomas, 1973)
- Hemiasterella callocyathus (Sollas, 1888)
- Hemiasterella complicata Topsent, 1919
- Hemiasterella digitata Burton, 1929
- Hemiasterella elongata Topsent, 1928
- Hemiasterella intermedia Dendy, 1922
- Hemiasterella magna Pulitzer-Finali, 1993
- Hemiasterella strongylophora Lévi, 1956
- Hemiasterella topsenti (Lévi & Lévi, 1983)
- Hemiasterella typus Carter, 1879
- Hemiasterella vasiformis (Kirkpatrick, 1903)
- Hemiasterella verae Idan, Shefer, Feldstein & Ilan, 2021
