= Paratimea =

Scientific classification
- Domain: Eukaryota
- Kingdom: Animalia
- Phylum: Porifera
- Class: Demospongiae
- Order: Axinellida
- Family: Stelligeridae
- Genus: Paratimea; Hallmann, 1917

Genus of sponges

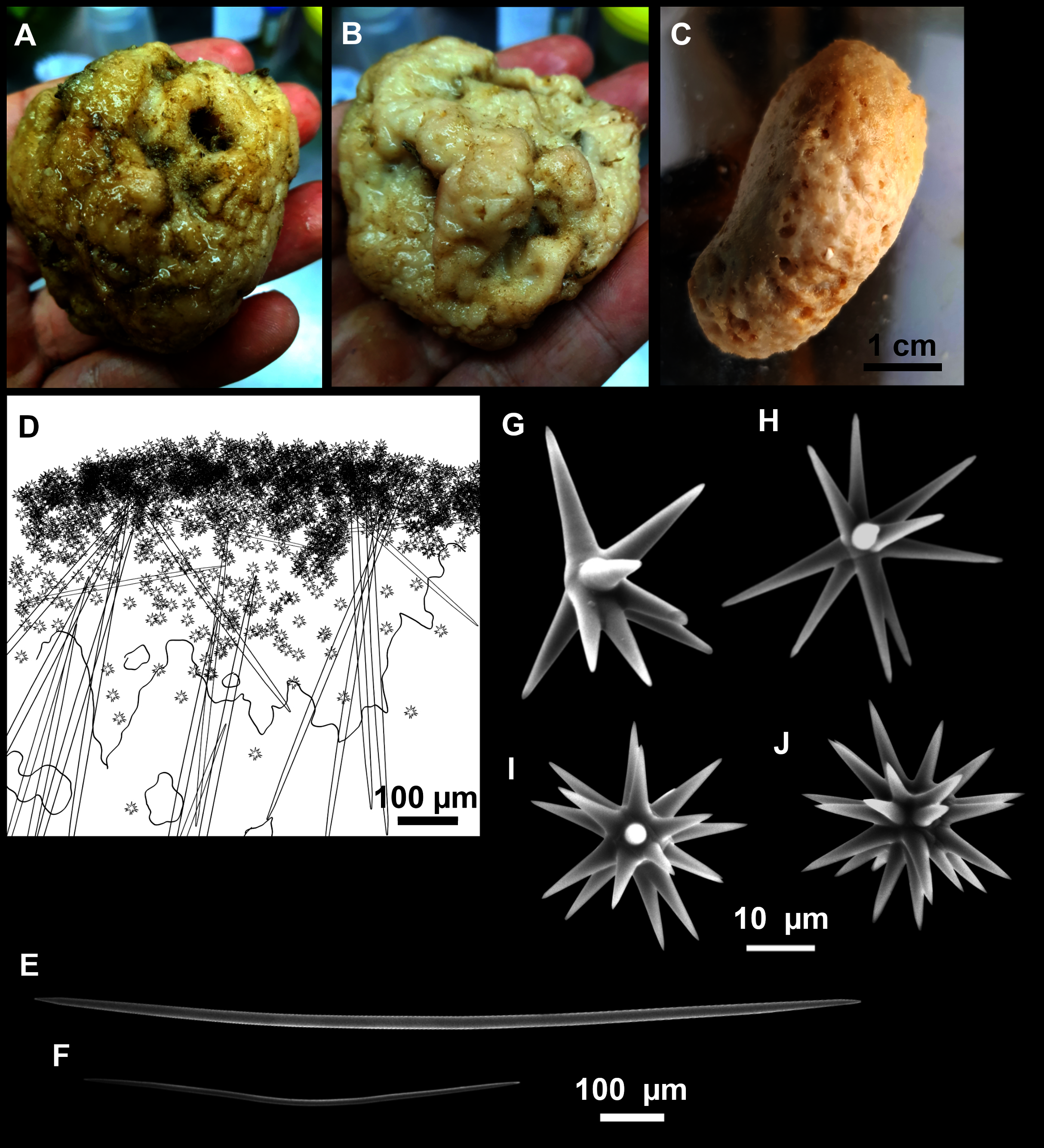
Different types of Paratimea massutii sponge

Paratimea is a genus of sponges belonging to the family Stelligeridae.

The species of this genus are found worldwide.

Species:

- Paratimea alijosensis Austin, 1996
- Paratimea arbuscula (Topsent, 1928)
- Paratimea aurantiaca Morrow, 2019
- Paratimea azorica (Topsent, 1904)
- Paratimea camelus (Van Soest, 2017)
- Paratimea constellata (Topsent, 1893)
- Paratimea dentata Morrow, 2019
- Paratimea duplex (Topsent, 1927)
- Paratimea galaxa de Laubenfels, 1936
- Paratimea globastrella van Soest, Kaiser & Van Syoc, 2011
- Paratimea hoffmannae Morrow & Cárdenas, 2019
- Paratimea lalori Morrow, 2019
- Paratimea loennbergi (Alander, 1942)
- Paratimea loricata (Sarà, 1958)
- Paratimea massutii Díaz, Ramirez-Amaro & Ordines, 2021
- Paratimea mosambicensis Morrow & Cárdenas, 2019
- Paratimea oxeata Pulitzer-Finali, 1978
- Paratimea pierantonii (Sarà, 1958)
- Paratimea rosacea Morrow & Cárdenas, 2019
- Paratimea solida (de Laubenfels, 1936)
