= Phycopsis (sponge) =

Scientific classification
- Domain: Eukaryota
- Kingdom: Animalia
- Phylum: Porifera
- Class: Demospongiae
- Order: Axinellida
- Family: Axinellidae
- Genus: Phycopsis; Carter, 1883

Species
- 8 species (see text)

Synonyms
- Ketosus de Laubenfels, 1936

Genus of sponges

Phycopsis is a genus of sponges belonging to the family Axinellidae. The species of this genus are found in Malesia and Australia.

== Species ==
This genus contains the following eight species:

- Phycopsis epakros (Hooper & Lévi, 1993)
- Phycopsis fruticulosa Carter, 1883
- Phycopsis fusiformis (Lévi, 1967)
- Phycopsis hirsuta Carter, 1883
- Phycopsis papillata (Hooper & Lévi, 1993)
- Phycopsis pesgalli Alvarez, de Voogd & van Soest, 2016
- Phycopsis setosa (Bowerbank, 1873)
- Phycopsis styloxeata Lage, Carvalho & Menegola, 2013
