= Stelligeridae =

Scientific classification
- Domain: Eukaryota
- Kingdom: Animalia
- Phylum: Porifera
- Class: Demospongiae
- Order: Axinellida
- Family: Stelligeridae

Family of sponges

Stelligeridae is a family of sponges belonging to the order Axinellida.

Genera:

- Halicnemia Bowerbank, 1864
- Higginsia Higgin, 1877
- Paratimea Hallmann, 1917
- Plenaster Lim & Wiklund, 2017
- Stelligera Gray, 1867
