= Léon Gaston Seurat =

French zoologist and parasitologist (1872–1949)

Léon Gaston Seurat (1872–1949) was a French zoologist and parasitologist known for his investigations of fauna native to French Polynesia and northern Africa.

In 1899 he submitted his graduate thesis on entomophagous Hymenoptera to the faculty of Paris, afterwards (1902–05) working as a naturalist in the South Seas, most notably in the Tuamotu and Gambier Islands. In May 1906 he began work as préparateur of zoology in the laboratory of Biologie appliquée aux colonies. Later on in his career, he was appointed professor of zoology at the University of Algiers.

Taxa with the specific epithet of seurati are named after him, a few examples being Acomys seurati (Seurat's spiny mouse), Perinereis seurati (an annelid species described by Charles Gravier in 1905) and Calcinus seurati (Seurat's hermit crab). Also a genus of fungi in the Ascomycota phylum was named Seuratia with its accompanying family Seuratiaceae.

== Selected works ==
- Observations sur la Structure, la Faune et la Flore de l'Ile Marutea du Sud, 1903 – Observations on the structure: The fauna and flora of Marutea Sud.
- Observations sur l'évolution de l'huître perlière des Tuamotu et des Gambier, 1904 – Observations on the evolution of pearl oysters of the Tuamotu and Gambier Islands.
- Observations sur quelques îles orientales de l'Archipel Tuamotu, 1904 – Observations on some of the eastern islands of the Tuamotu Archipelago.
- Tahiti et les établissements français de l'Océanie, 1906 – Tahiti and the French establishments in Oceania.
- Sur un nouvel Ophiostonum parasite du Gundi, 1915 – On a new Ophiostonum parasite affecting gundis.
- Sur deux nouveaux Spiroptères des carnivores, 1915 – On two new Spiroptera species affecting carnivores.
- Physaloptères des Mammifères du Nord-Africain, 1917 – Physaloptera affecting mammals of North Africa.
- Faune des eaux continentales de la Berbérie, 1921 – Wildlife of the inland waters of the Barbary.
- Exploration zoologique de l'Algérie de 1830 à 1930, (1930) – Zoological exploration of coastal Algeria from 1830 to 1920.
- Exploration zoologique des côtes de l'Algérie de 1724 à 1930, (1930) – Zoological exploration of coastal Algeria from 1724 to 1930.
- Exploration zoologique des côtes de l'Algérie orientale secteurs de Bône et de La Calle, 1937 – Zoological exploration of the eastern coastal Algerian sectors of Bône and La Calle.
- Faune des eaux continentales de la Tunisie (eaux superficielles), 1944 – Wildlife of the inland waters of Tunisia (surface water).
