= Henry Higgins (botanist) =

Henry Hugh Higgins (1814–1893) was an English botanist, bryologist, geologist, curator and clergyman. He is cited as an authority in scientific classification, as Higgins.

== Life ==
He was the second son of John Higgins of Turvey Abbey, Bedfordshire, the younger brother of Charles Longuet Higgins. He was educated at Corpus Christi College, Cambridge, graduating B.A. in 1836, M.A. in 1842.

Higgins was inspector of the National Schools in Liverpool from 1842 to 1848 and chaplain to the Rainhill Asylum, also in Liverpool. In 1848 he travelled in Egypt, Sinai and Palestine, with his brother Charles. He was president of the Liverpool Field Naturalists' Club from 1861 to 1881.

He especially worked on the Ravenhead collections, almost wholly made up of Upper Carboniferous flora, fish, bivalves and insect remains. Higgins had suggested that Ravenhead donate his collections to the Liverpool Museum and the donation gained a home with the construction of the railway in 1870, which exposed two Carboniferous seams known as the Upper and Lower Ravenhead. Most of Liverpool Museum's collections survived the Liverpool Blitz of May 1941 which practically destroyed the Museum itself, but the entire Ravenhead collection was lost in the fire.

== Selected publications ==
- 1882. The Turvey ammonite: a paper read before the Literary and Philosophical Society of Liverpool, October 16, 1882. 8 pp.
- 1890. What is religion?.

=== Books ===
- 1858. ... Synopsis and list of British Hymenomycetes, arranged according to the epicrisis of M. Fries. Ed. H. Greenwood. 54 pp.
- 1858. The Fungi of Liverpool and its vicinity... Ed. H. Greenwood. 81 pp.
- 1859. ... Synopsis and list of British Gastromycetes. 122 pp.
- henry hugh Higgins, joseph Henry. 1872. On vitality. Annual report of the Board of Regents of the Smithsonian Institution. 388 pp.
- 1874. Synopsis of an arrangement of invertebrate animals in the Free public museum of Liverpool: with introduction. Issue 28 of the Proceedings of the Literary & Philosophical Society of Liverpool. Ed. D. Marples. 104 pp. Republished by General Books LLC, in 2010, 72 pp. ISBN 978-1-153-39726-1
- 1877. Notes by a field-naturalist in the western tropics: from a journal kept on board the Royal Mersey steam yacht "Argo". Ed. E. Howell. 205 pp. Republished by BiblioLife, in 2010, 252 pp. ISBN 978-1-146-83768-2

== Eponyms ==
=== Genera ===
- (Stelligeridae) Higginsia Higgin

=== Species ===
- (Hookeriaceae) Hookeria higginsii Besch. ex Higgins
- (Dictyoneuridae) Dictyoneura higginsi Handlirsch
- (Pristidae) Myriosteon higginsi Gray

== Family ==
Higgins married Anne Gouthwaite, daughter of John Topper Gouthwaite, in 1852. They had three sons and four daughters.

== Sources ==
- alan j. Bowden, wendy Simkiss. Henry Hugh Higgins and Frederick Price Marrat: the reluctant palaeobotanists and the Ravenhead collections. In the Proceedings of the Geologists' Association, 114, 327-338
- w. Simkiss, a.j. Bowden. Palaeobotanical studies and collecting in the 19th century, with particular reference to the Ravenhead collection and Henry Hugh Higgins. In Bowden, A.J., Burek, C.V. & Wilding, R. (eds) 2005. History of Palaeobotany: Selected Essays. Geological Society, London, Special Publications, 241, 111-126
