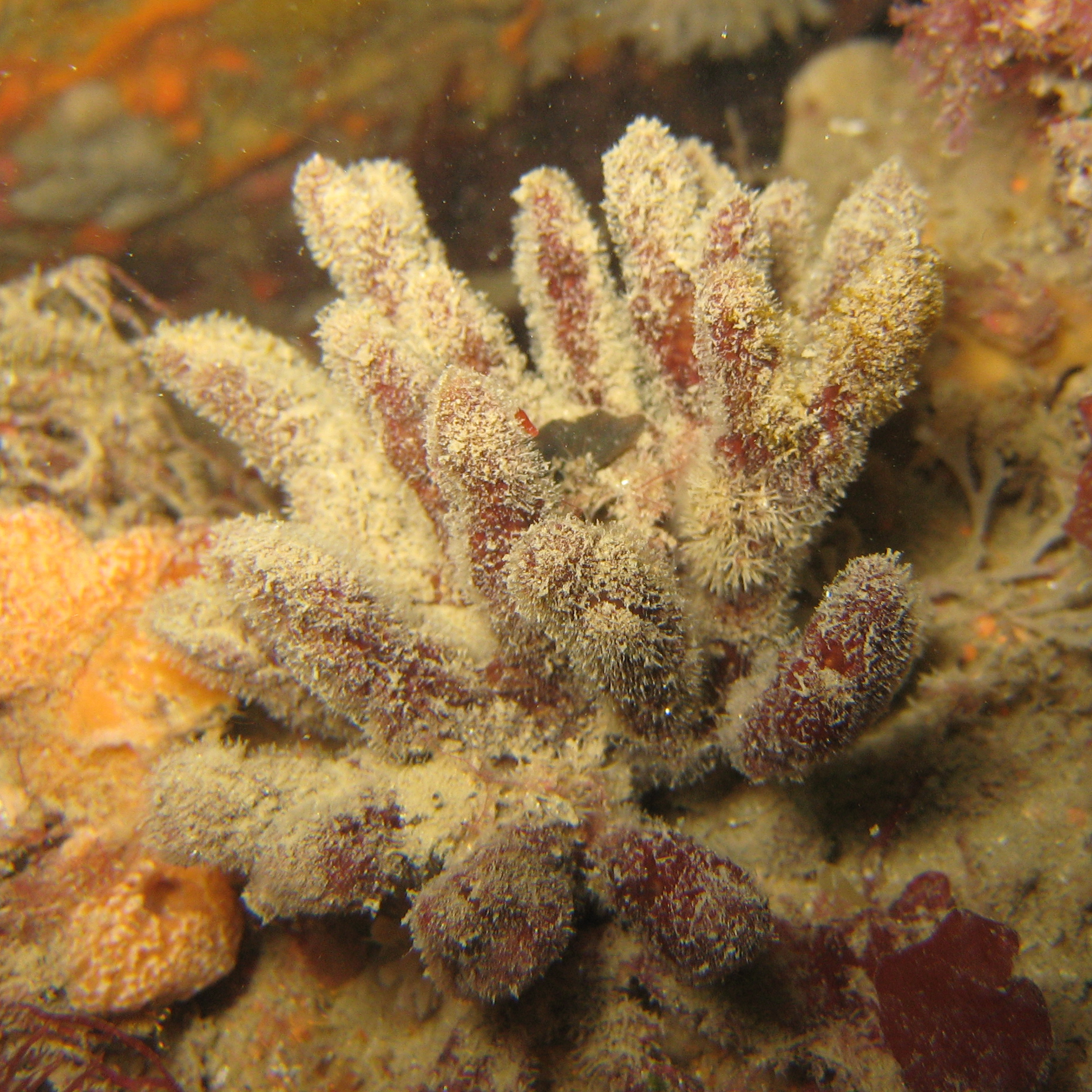
- Raspailia ramosa

Scientific classification
- Kingdom: Animalia
- Phylum: Porifera
- Class: Demospongiae
- Order: Axinellida
- Family: Raspailiidae; Nardo, 1833

= Raspailiidae =

Family of sponges

Raspailiidae is a family of sponges belonging to the order Axinellida.

== Genera ==
There are twenty-two genera:

- Acantheurypon Topsent, 1927
- Aulospongus Norman, 1878
- Axechina Hentschel, 1912
- Cantabrina Ferrer Hernández, 1914
- Ceratopsion Strand, 1928
- Cyamon Gray, 1867
- Didiscus Dendy, 1922
- Echinodictyum Ridley, 1881
- Ectyoplasia Topsent, 1931
- Endectyon Topsent, 1920
- Eurypon Gray, 1867
- Hymeraphia Bowerbank, 1864
- Lithoplocamia Dendy, 1922
- Plocamione Topsent, 1927
- Raspaciona Topsent, 1936
- Raspailia Nardo, 1833
- Rhapdeurypon Vacelet, 1969
- Sollasella Lendenfeld, 1888
- Thrinacophora Ridley, 1885
- Trachostylea Topsent, 1928
- Trikentrion Ehlers, 1870
- Waltherarndtia de Laubenfels, 1936
