= Stelligera (sponge) =

Scientific classification
- Kingdom: Animalia
- Phylum: Porifera
- Class: Demospongiae
- Order: Axinellida
- Family: Stelligeridae
- Genus: Stelligera; Gray, 1867

Genus of sponges

Stelligera is a genus of sponges belonging to the family Stelligeridae.

The species of this genus are found in Western Europe.

Species:

- Stelligera columnata (Lévi, 1959)
- Stelligera montagui Van Soest & Hooper, 2020
- Stelligera mutila (Topsent, 1928)
- Stelligera nux Lendenfeld, 1898
- Stelligera rigida (Montagu, 1814)
- Stelligera stuposa (Ellis & Solander, 1786)
