= Seuratiaceae =

Scientific classification
- Kingdom: Fungi
- Division: Ascomycota
- Class: incertae sedis
- Order: incertae sedis
- Family: Seuratiaceae; Vuill. ex M.E. Barr

Type genus
- Seuratia Pat.

Genera Seuratiopsis (1 species)
- Seuratia (3 species)

Family of fungi

The Seuratiaceae are a family of fungi in the Ascomycota division. This family can not yet be taxonomically classified in any of the ascomycetous classes and orders with any degree of certainty (incertae sedis).

The genus name of Seuratia is in honour of Léon Gaston Seurat (1872–1949) was a French zoologist and parasitologist known for his investigations of fauna native to French Polynesia and northern Africa.
