= Heteroxyidae =

Scientific classification
- Kingdom: Animalia
- Phylum: Porifera
- Class: Demospongiae
- Order: Axinellida
- Family: Heteroxyidae

Family of sponges

Heteroxyidae is a family of sponges belonging to the order Axinellida.

Genera:

- Alloscleria Topsent, 1927
- Alveospongia Santos, Pinheiro, Hajdu & Van Soest, 2016
- Heteroxya Topsent, 1898
- Julavis de Laubenfels, 1936
- Microxistyla Topsent, 1928
- Myrmekioderma Ehlers, 1870
- Negombo Dendy, 1905
- Parahigginsia Dendy, 1924
