= Rob van Soest =

Dutch marine biologist - specialist in sponges

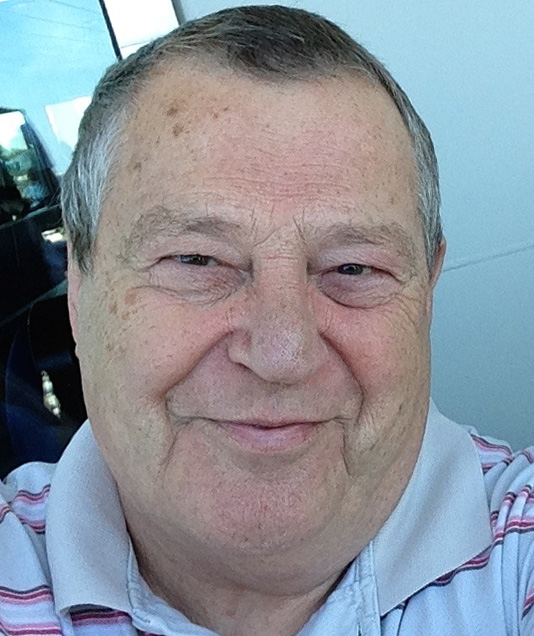
- Born: 5 May 1946
- Education: University of Amsterdam
- Occupations: Marine biologist, scientific collector, docent
- Employers: Naturalis Biodiversity Center (2012–); University of Amsterdam (2007–2012)

Robertus Wilhelmus Maria van Soest, born in 1946, is a Dutch marine biologist. He works at the Naturalis Biodiversity Center and is also affiliated with the University of Amsterdam. He co-authored with John N. A. Hooper Systema Porifera: A Guide to the Classification of Sponges, a standard reference for sponge classification.

He was editor in chief of the World Porifera Database (WPD) from 2004 to 2021, and is currently (March 2022) one of its taxonomic editors.

He has contributed to the systematics, the phylogeny and the taxonomy of sponges, to their chemistry and biological properties (and the pharmacological use thereof)

His zoological abbreviation is van Soest.

== Taxa ==
A search on his name (March 2022) in the WoRMS database gives 691 taxa names authored by van Soest. See also taxa named by Rob van Soest.

== Publications ==
He has authored (co-authored) over at least 170 peer reviewed scientific papers, over 60 of which concern the biochemistry of sponges.
