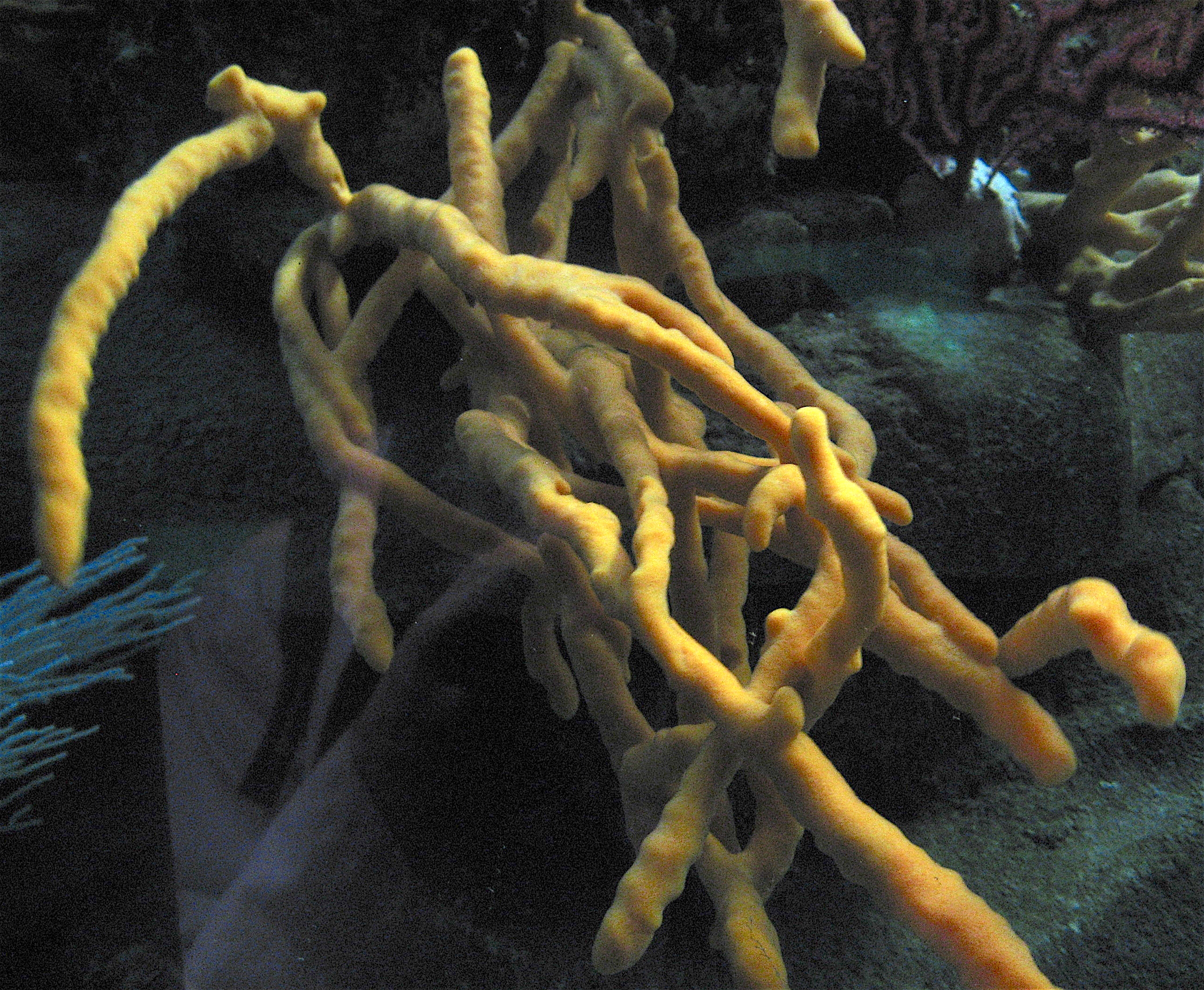
- Axinella polypoides

Scientific classification
- Kingdom: Animalia
- Phylum: Porifera
- Class: Demospongiae
- Order: Axinellida
- Family: Axinellidae; Carter, 1875

Genera
- 10 genera (see text)

Synonyms
- Phakellidae Gray, 1867

= Axinellidae =

Family of sponges

Axinellidae is a family of sponges in the order Axinellida.

This family includes some photosynthetic sponges that occur throughout the world's coral reefs. They are among the more common sponges seen in the aquarium trade, but are usually not successful species in captivity, and not ones that thrive in the small household tank environment. They are common throughout the Indian Ocean and the Pacific Ocean coral reefs. Species which derive their nutrition from sunlight must stay fairly close to the surface in order for their zooxanthellae to produce the sugars these sponges use to survive.

== Genera ==
There are ten genera:

- Axinella Schmidt, 1862
- Dragmacidon Hallmann, 1917
- Dragmaxia Hallmann, 1916
- Ophiraphidites Carter, 1876
- Pararhaphoxya Burton, 1934
- Phycopsis Carter, 1883
- Pipestela Alvarez, Hooper & van Soest, 2008
- Ptilocaulis Carter, 1883
- Reniochalina Lendenfeld, 1888
