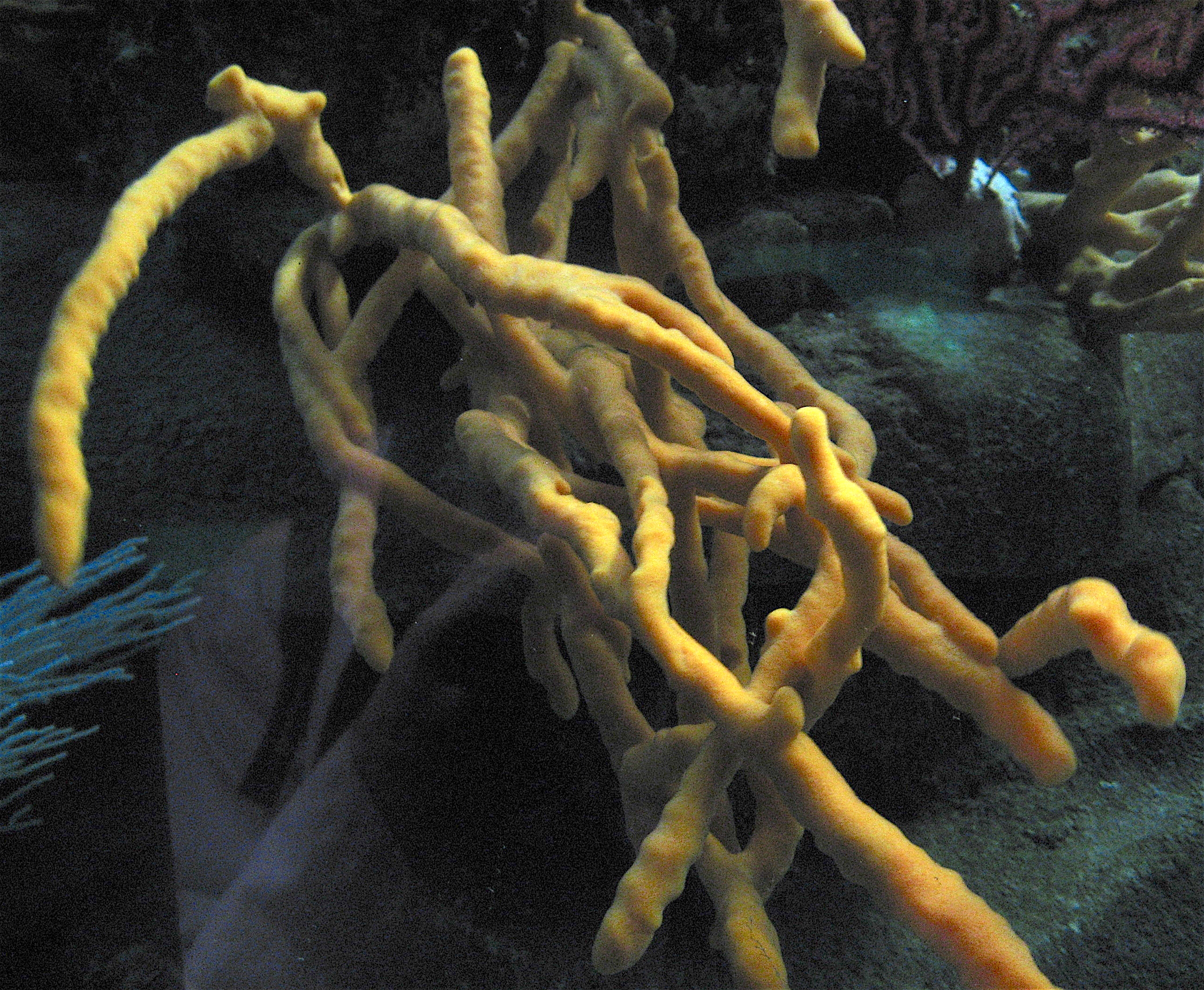
- Axinella polypoides

Scientific classification
- Kingdom: Animalia
- Phylum: Porifera
- Class: Demospongiae
- Subclass: Heteroscleromorpha
- Order: Axinellida; Lévi, 1953

Families
- Axinellidae Carter, 1875; Heteroxyidae Dendy, 1905; Raspailiidae Nardo, 1833; Stelligeridae Lendenfeld, 1898

= Axinellida =

Order of sponges

Axinellida is an order of demosponges in the subclass Heteroscleromorpha. The order contains the families Axinellidae, Heteroxyidae, Raspailiidae, and Stelligeridae.
