= Auletta (disambiguation) =

Auletta is a town in Italy.

Auletta may also refer to:

- Auletta (band), a German rock band
- Auletta (sponge), a genus of sponges
- Auletta, a genus of spiders, synonym of Macrargus
- Auletta (surname), including a list of people with the name

== See also ==
- Oletta, a commune in Corsica
