= Acanthella =

Acanthella may refer to:

- Acanthella (plant), a genus of flowering plants
- Acanthella (sponge), a genus of demosponges
- An intermediate life stage of acanthocephalans
