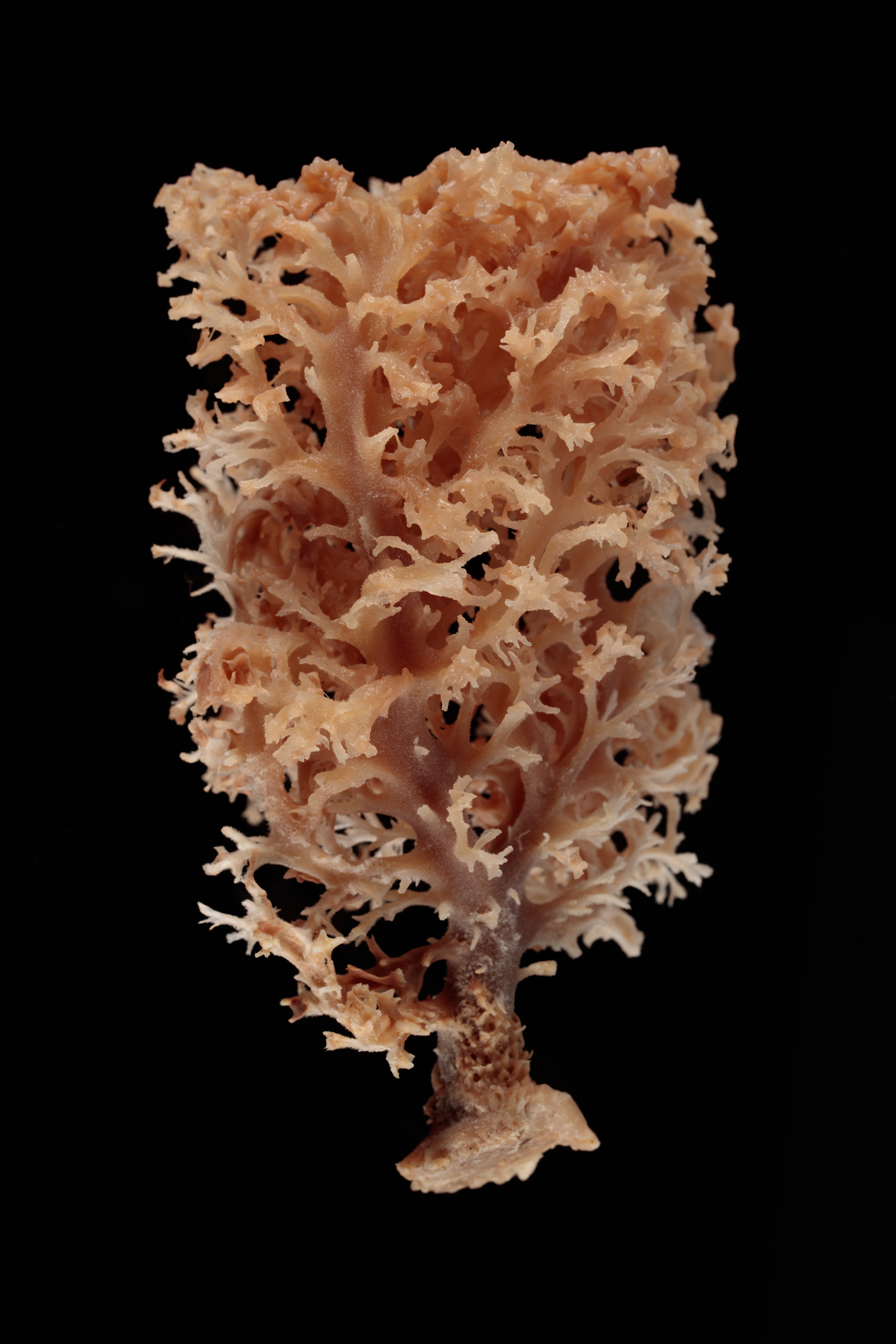
- Specimen from the collections of Auckland War Memorial Museum

Scientific classification
- Kingdom: Animalia
- Phylum: Porifera
- Class: Demospongiae
- Order: Bubarida
- Family: Dictyonellidae
- Genus: Acanthella
- Species: A. dendyi

Binomial name
- Acanthella dendyi (Bergquist, 1970)

Synonyms
- Phakellia dendyi Bergquist, 1970

= Acanthella dendyi =

Species of sponge

Holotype sites

Acanthella dendyi is a marine sessile filter-feeder sponge in the family Dictyonellidae, first described by Patricia Bergquist in 1970 as Phakellia dendyi

== Distribution ==
In Australian waters it is found from Victorian coastal water, all the way up the east coast to Queensland and then all the way across the northern coasts to the north-west coast of Western Australia, at depths from 8–180 m.
