= Dictyonella =

Dictyonella may refer to:

- Dictyonella (sponge), a genus of sponges in the family Dictyonellidae
- Dictyonella (fungus), a genus of fungi in the family Saccardiaceae
- Dictyonella, junior synonym of Eodictyonella, a genus of brachiopods in family Eichwaldiidae and in the order Dictyonellida
