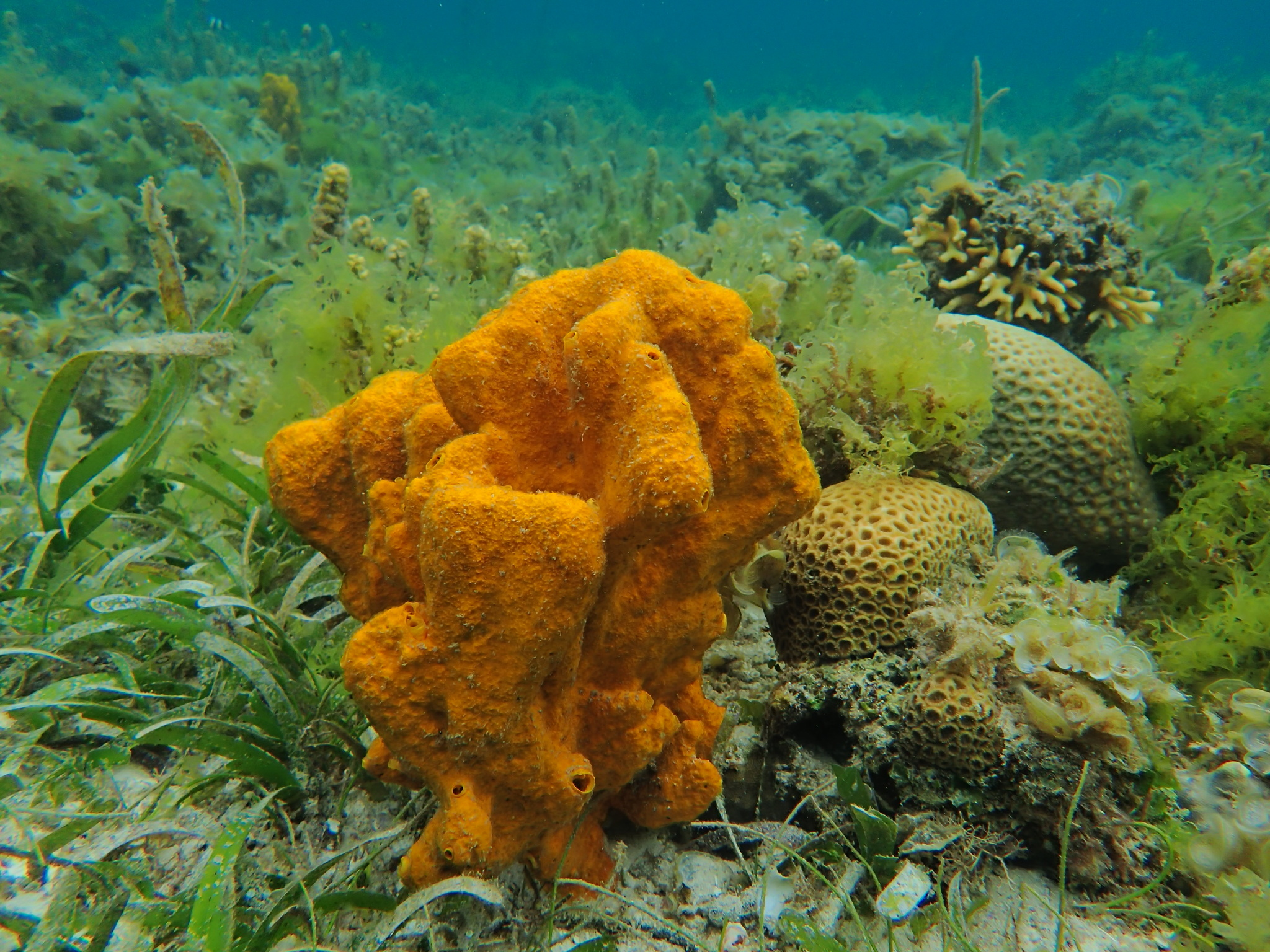
- Stylissa massa (orange), photographed off Bohol, Philippines (2024)

Scientific classification
- Kingdom: Animalia
- Phylum: Porifera
- Class: Demospongiae
- Order: Scopalinida
- Family: Scopalinidae
- Genus: Stylissa
- Species: S. massa

Binomial name
- Stylissa massa (Carter, 1887)

= Stylissa massa =

Species of sponge

Stylissa massa is a species of sponge that was first described by H.J. Carter 1887. Several bioactive compounds have been isolated from this species, including palau'amine, stylissatin A, and the USP7 inhibitor Spongiacidin C.
