= Cymbastela =

Scientific classification
- Kingdom: Animalia
- Phylum: Porifera
- Class: Demospongiae
- Order: Axinellida
- Family: Axinellidae
- Genus: Cymbastela; Hooper & Bergquist, 1992

Species
- See text

Genus of sponges

Cymbastela is a genus of sponges of uncertain placement within the order Bubarida.

== List of species ==
- Cymbastela cantharella (Lévi, 1983)
- Cymbastela concentrica (Lendenfeld 1887)
- Cymbastela coralliophila Hooper & Bergquist, 1992
- Cymbastela lamellata (Bergquist, 1961)
- Cymbastela marshae Hooper & Bergquist, 1992
- Cymbastela notiaina Hooper & Bergquist, 1992
- Cymbastela sodwaniensis Samaai, Pillay & Kelly, 2009
- Cymbastela stipitata (Bergquist & Tizard, 1967)
- Cymbastela vespertina Hooper & Bergquist, 1992
