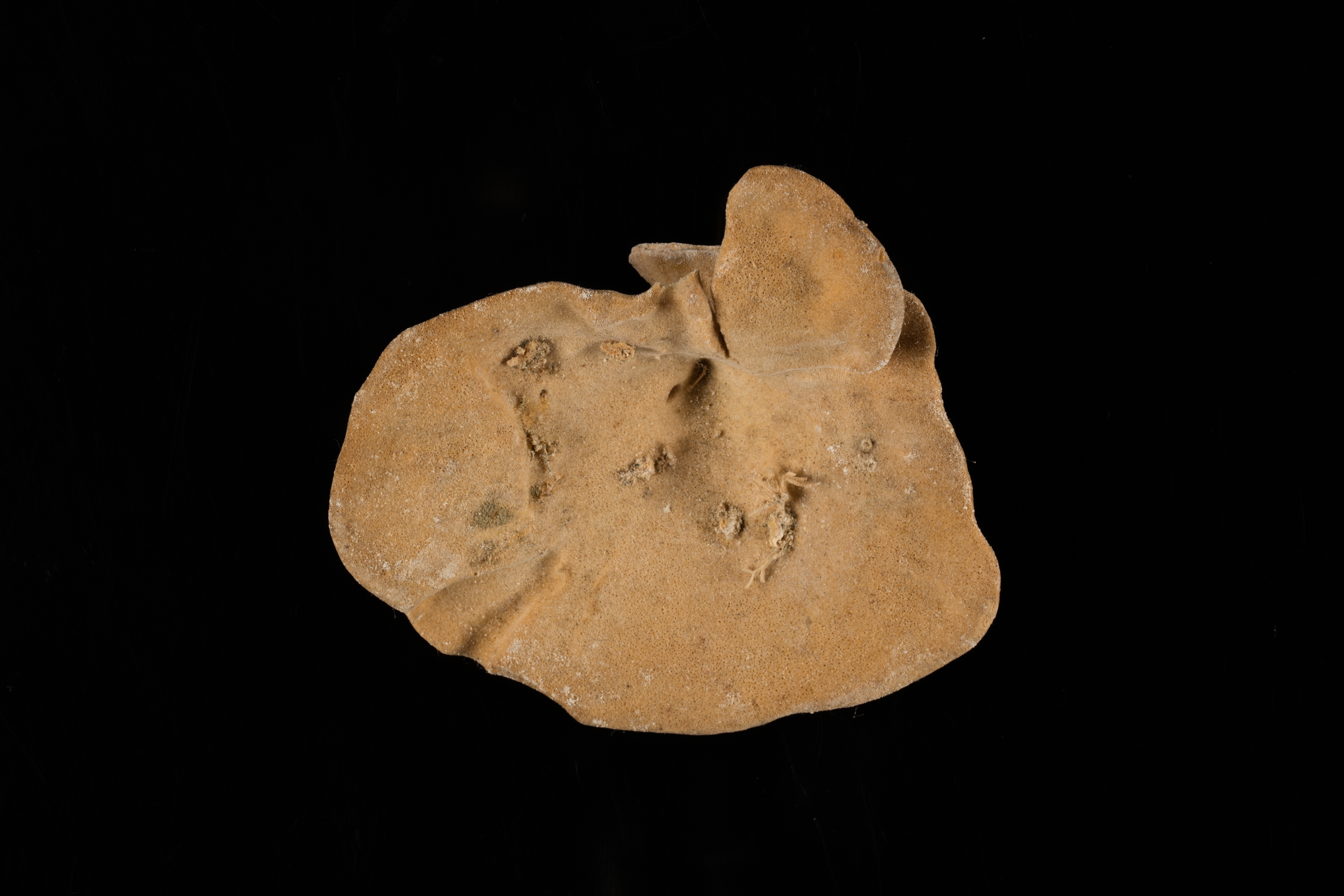
- Cymbastela lamellata

Scientific classification
- Kingdom: Animalia
- Phylum: Porifera
- Class: Demospongiae
- Order: Bubarida
- Family: incertae sedis
- Genus: Cymbastela
- Species: C. lamellata

Binomial name
- Cymbastela lamellata (Bergquist, 1961)

Synonyms
- Axinella tricalyciformis Bergquist, 1961; (Axinella lamellata) Bergquist, 1961

= Cymbastela lamellata =

Species of sponge

Cymbastela lamellata is a species of marine sponge. It is of uncertain placement within the order Bubarida.

The sponge was first described in 1961 by Patricia Bergquist as Axinella lamellata, however the name had already been used, and she renamed it in 1970 as Axinella tricalciformis.

It is known from both the Chatham Islands and from waters around Tasmania, where it has been found at depths of 6–90 m. It is a sessile, filter feeder.

C. lamellata is a dominant marine sponge in Fiordland, New Zealand. A mass bleaching event (akin to coral bleaching) of C. lamellata was reported throughout much of Fiordland following a heatwave in mid-2022, causing C. lamellata to expel their symbiotic algae. This was the largest case of temperate sponge bleaching ever recorded. Despite the bleaching event, most of the bleached sponges were found to be still alive, although at intensified risk of fish predation.
