= Cymbastela stipitata =

Scientific classification
- Kingdom: Animalia
- Phylum: Porifera
- Class: Demospongiae
- Order: Bubarida
- Family: incertae sedis
- Genus: Cymbastela
- Species: C. stipitata

Binomial name
- Cymbastela stipitata (Bergquist & Tizard, 1967)

Synonyms.
- Pseudaxinyssa stipitata Bergquist & Tizard, 1967

Species of sponge

Cymbastela stipitata is a species of marine sponge of uncertain placement within the order Bubarida.

The sponge was first described in 1967 by Patricia Bergquist and Catherine Tizard as Pseudaxinyssa stipitata, but was assigned to the new genus, Cymbastela, in 1992 by John Hooper and Patricia Bergquist.

It is found in Australia's coastal waters, from the Gulf of Carpentaria to the north west coasts of Western Australia. It is a sessile filter-feeder, found generally in intertidal waters on coral reefs at depths up to 19 m.
