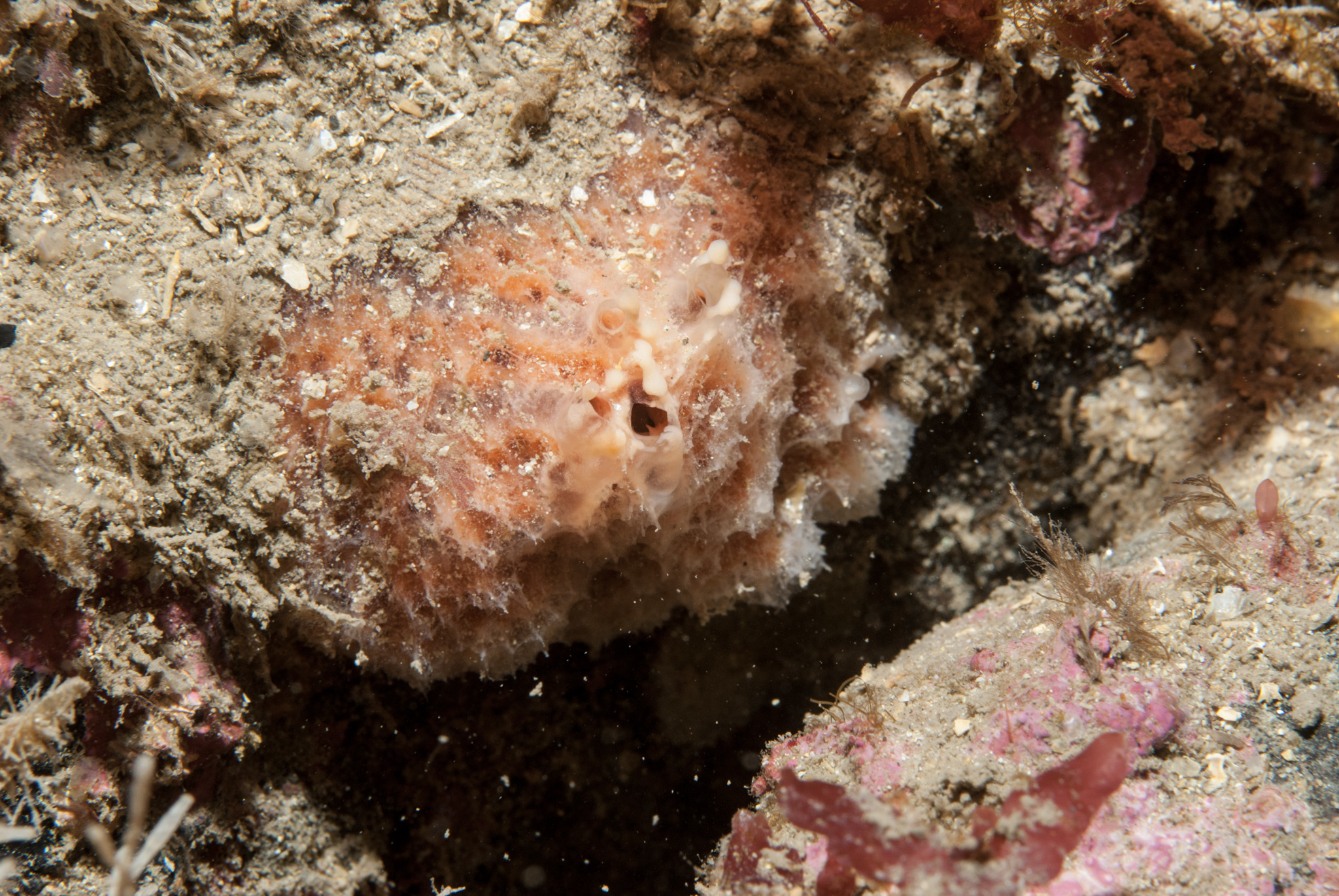
- Tethyspira spinosa

Scientific classification
- Kingdom: Animalia
- Phylum: Porifera
- Class: Demospongiae
- Order: Bubarida
- Family: Dictyonellidae
- Genus: Tethyspira; Topsent, 1890
- Species: T. spinosa

Binomial name
- Tethyspira spinosa (Bowerbank, 1874)

= Tethyspira =

Genus of sponges

Tethyspira is a monotypic genus of sponges belonging to the family Dictyonellidae. The only species is Tethyspira spinosa.

The species is found in western Europe.
