= Stylissa caribica =

Scientific classification
- Kingdom: Animalia
- Phylum: Porifera
- Class: Demospongiae
- Order: Scopalinida
- Family: Scopalinidae
- Genus: Stylissa
- Species: S. caribica

Binomial name
- Stylissa caribica Lehnert & van Soest, 1998

Species of sponge

Stylissa caribica is a species of sponge. Stylisins 1 and 2 are antimicrobial cyclic heptapeptides which have been isolated from this species.
