= Cymbastela coralliophila =

Scientific classification
- Kingdom: Animalia
- Phylum: Porifera
- Class: Demospongiae
- Order: Bubarida
- Family: incertae sedis
- Genus: Cymbastela
- Species: C. coralliophila

Binomial name
- Cymbastela coralliophila Hooper & Bergquist, 1992

Species of sponge

Holotype sites

Cymbastela coralliophila is a species of marine sponge of uncertain placement within the order Bubarida.

The sponge was first described in 1992 by John Hooper and Patricia Bergquist.

It occurs along the Queensland coast, where it is found subtidally to depths up to 20 m, inhabiting coral reefs and lagoon and reef slopes, in waters with surface temperatures from 20 to 30 °C. It has also been found off the eastern tip of New Guinea. It is a sessile, filter feeder.
