= Stylissa flabelliformis =

Scientific classification
- Kingdom: Animalia
- Phylum: Porifera
- Class: Demospongiae
- Order: Scopalinida
- Family: Scopalinidae
- Genus: Stylissa
- Species: S. flabelliformis

Binomial name
- Stylissa flabelliformis (Hentschel, 1912)

Synonyms
- Stylotella flabelliformis Hentschel, 1912

Species of sponge

Stylissa flabelliformis, known as the orange fan sponge, is found throughout the tropical oceans. It is usually shaped liked a Japanese fan hence its name. It feeds on plankton. In the wild it prefers to grow on rocky shelves. It is sometime but not often kept by hobby aquarists.
