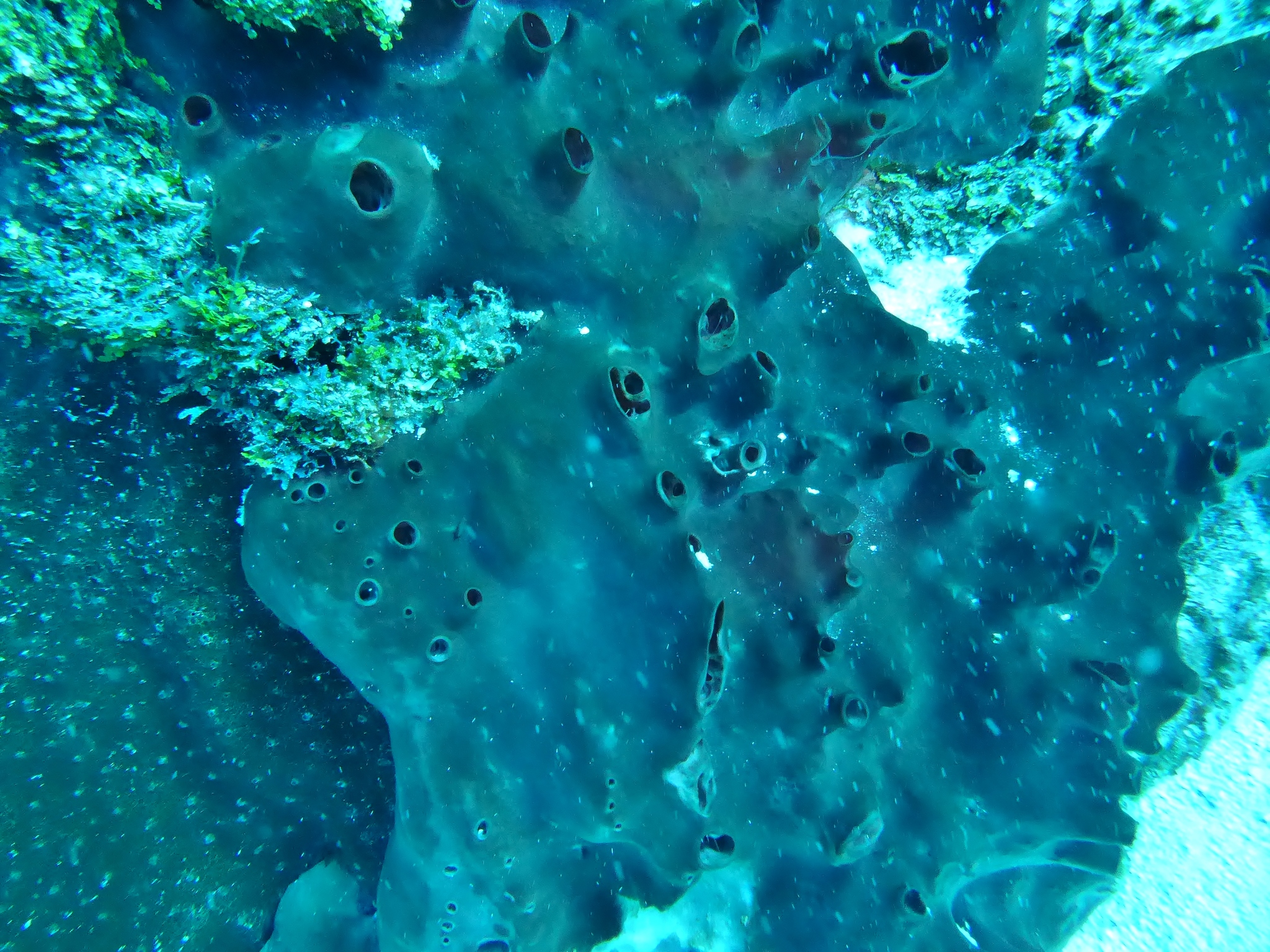

Scientific classification
- Kingdom: Animalia
- Phylum: Porifera
- Class: Demospongiae
- Order: Scopalinida
- Family: Scopalinidae
- Genus: Svenzea
- Species: S. zeai

Binomial name
- Svenzea zeai (Alvarez, van Soest & Rützler, 1998)

Synonyms
- Pseudaxinella zeai Alvarez, van Soest & Rützler, 1998

= Svenzea zeai =

Species of sponge

Svenzea zeai is a species of sponge belonging to the family Scopalinidae, first described in 1998 as Pseudaxinella zeai. The species epithet, zeai, honours the Colombian spongiologist Sven Zea who first collected it.

It is found in the West Atlantic Ocean, and is a common sponge of off-shore reefs in the Caribbean

il produces the largest embryos and larvae so far recorded for sponges.
