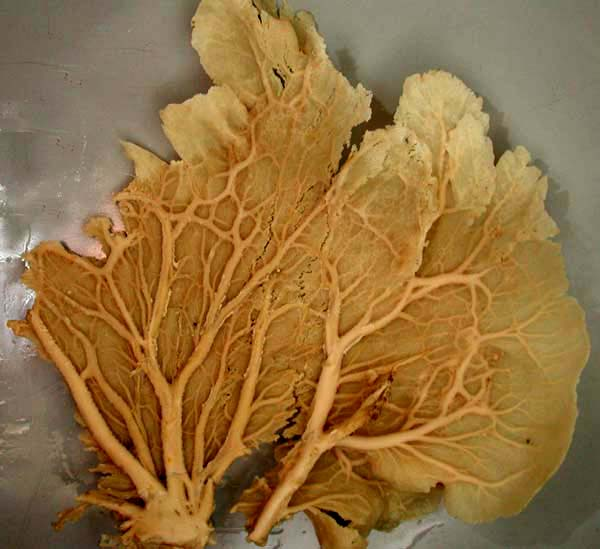

Scientific classification
- Kingdom: Animalia
- Phylum: Porifera
- Class: Demospongiae
- Order: Bubarida
- Family: Bubaridae
- Genus: Phakellia; Bowerbank, 1862

Species
- 34 species (see text)

= Phakellia =

Genus of sponges

Phakellia is a genus of sponges belonging to the family Bubaridae. The genus has a cosmopolitan distribution.

== Species ==
The genus contains the following species:

- Phakellia atypica Lévi, 1961
- Phakellia bettinae Lehnert & van Soest, 1999
- Phakellia carduus (Lamarck, 1814)
- Phakellia columnata (Burton, 1928)
- Phakellia connexiva Ridley & Dendy, 1887
- Phakellia crassistylifera Dendy, 1905
- Phakellia crateriformis (Pallas, 1766)
- Phakellia dalli Lambe, 1895
- Phakellia elegans Thiele, 1898
- Phakellia flabellata Carter, 1885
- Phakellia foliacea Thiele, 1898
- Phakellia folium Schmidt, 1870
- Phakellia fusca Thiele, 1898
- Phakellia hirondellei Topsent, 1890
- Phakellia hooperi Desqueyroux-Faúndez & van Soest, 1997
- Phakellia izuensis Tanita & Hoshino, 1989
- Phakellia labellum (Lamarck, 1814)
- Phakellia lambei Topsent, 1913
- Phakellia lamelligera Wilson, 1904
- Phakellia multiformis Whitelegge, 1907
- Phakellia palmata Row, 1911
- Phakellia paupera Thiele, 1898
- Phakellia perforata Thiele, 1898
- Phakellia pygmaea Thiele, 1898
- Phakellia radiata (Dendy, 1916)
- Phakellia robusta Bowerbank, 1866
- Phakellia rubra Samaai, Pillay & Janson, 2019
- Phakellia stelliderma Lévi & Lévi, 1989
- Phakellia stipitata (Carter, 1881)
- Phakellia stuartridleyi Van Soest & Hooper, 2020
- Phakellia sur Carvalho, Desqueyroux-Faúndez & Hajdu, 2007
- Phakellia symmetrica Dendy, 1905
- Phakellia tropicalis Alvarez & Hooper, 2009
- Phakellia ventilabrum (Linnaeus, 1767)
