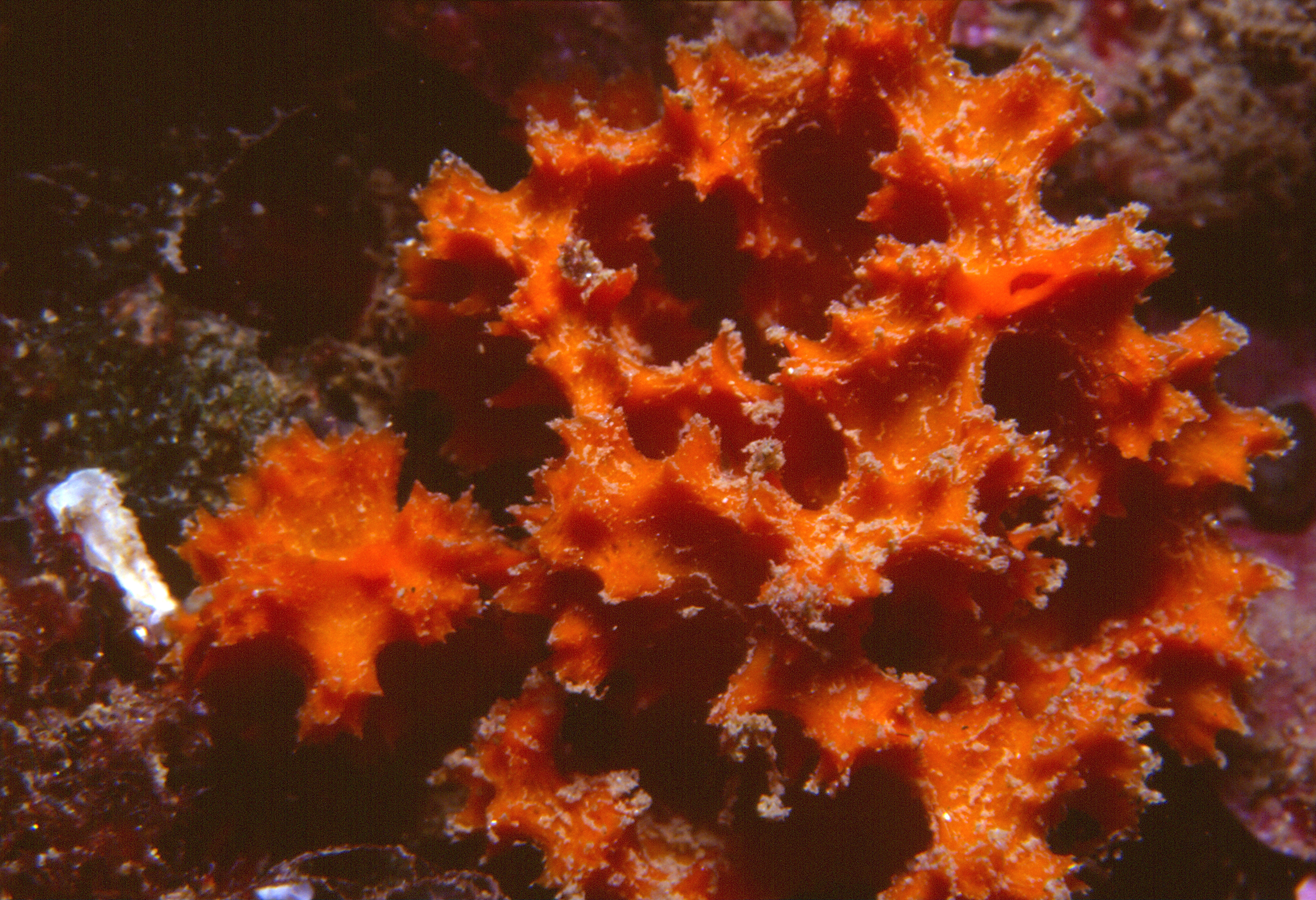
- Acanthella acuta

Scientific classification
- Kingdom: Animalia
- Phylum: Porifera
- Class: Demospongiae
- Order: Bubarida
- Family: Dictyonellidae; Van Soest, Diaz & Pomponi, 1990

Genera
- See text

= Dictyonellidae =

Family of sponges

Dictyonellidae is a family of sponges in the order Bubarida, based on the genus Dictyonella Schmidt, 1868.

It may be noted that Dictyonellida Cooper, 1956 is, however, a brachiopod order based on Dictyonella Hall, 1868 (now Eodictyonella Wright, 1994).

== Genera ==
- Acanthella Schmidt, 1862
- Dictyonella Schmidt, 1868
- Liosina Thiele, 1899
- Lipastrotethya de Laubenfels, 1954
- Phakettia de Laubenfels, 1936
- Rhaphoxya Hallmann, 1917
- Scopalina Schmidt, 1862
- Stylissa Hallmann, 1914
- Svenzea Alvarez, van Soest & Rützler, 2002
- Tethyspira Topsent, 1890
