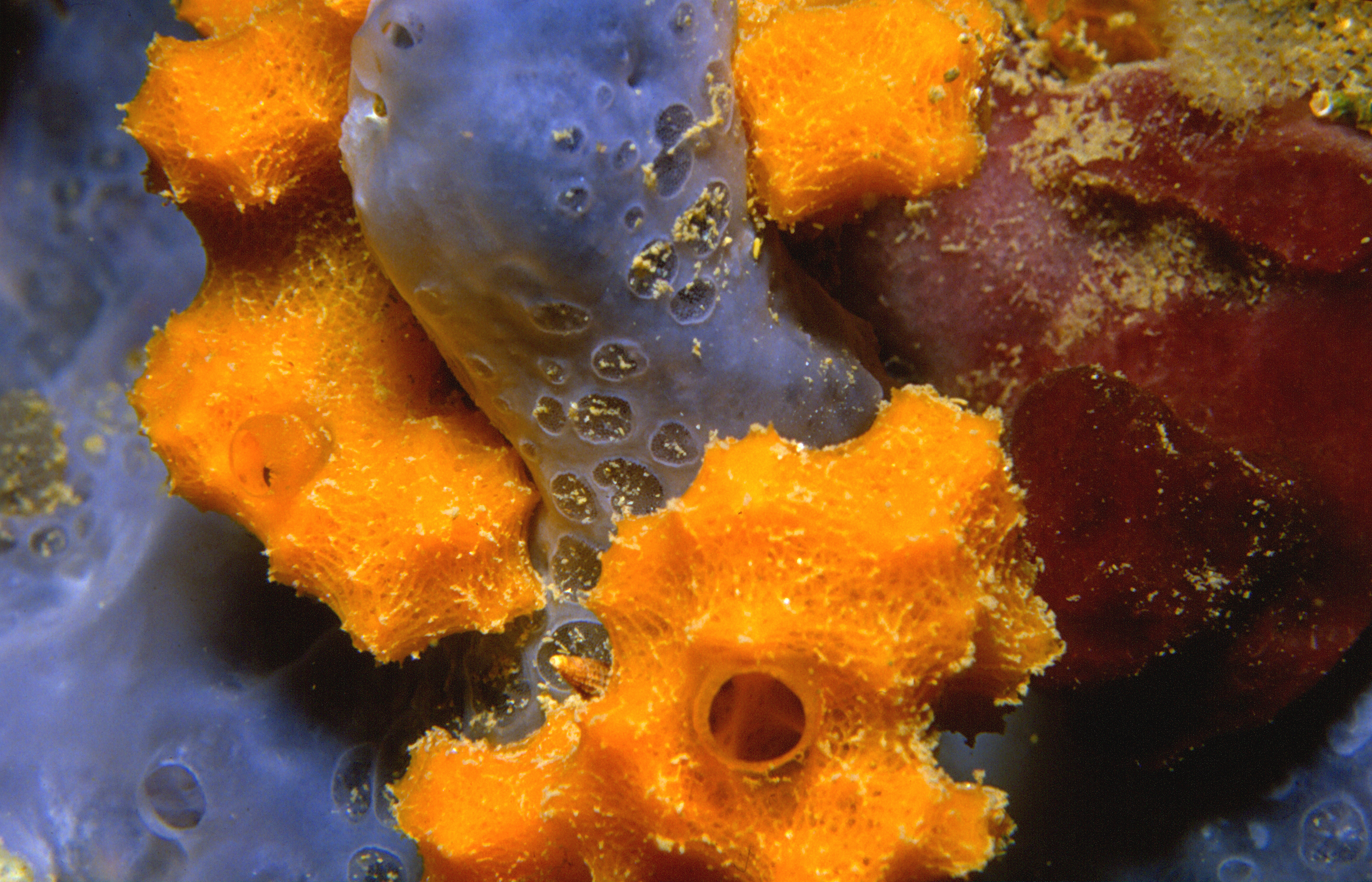
- Dictyonella incisa

Scientific classification
- Kingdom: Animalia
- Phylum: Porifera
- Class: Demospongiae
- Order: Bubarida
- Family: Dictyonellidae
- Genus: Dictyonella; Schmidt, 1868

= Dictyonella (sponge) =

Genus of sponges

Dictyonella is a genus of sponges belonging to the family Dictyonellidae.

The genus has almost cosmopolitan distribution.

Species:

- Dictyonella alonsoi Carballo, Uriz & García-Gómez, 1996
- Dictyonella arenosa (Rützler, 1981)
- Dictyonella chlorophyllacea Alvarez & Hooper, 2010
- Dictyonella conglomerata (Dendy, 1922)
- Dictyonella foliaformis Lehnert & van Soest, 1996
- Dictyonella funicularis (Rützler, 1981)
- Dictyonella hirta (Topsent, 1889)
- Dictyonella incisa (Schmidt, 1880)
- Dictyonella madeirensis (Topsent, 1928)
- Dictyonella marsilii (Topsent, 1893)
- Dictyonella obtusa (Schmidt, 1862)
- Dictyonella pelligera (Schmidt, 1864)
