= Palau'amine =

- Chemical structure of palau'amine

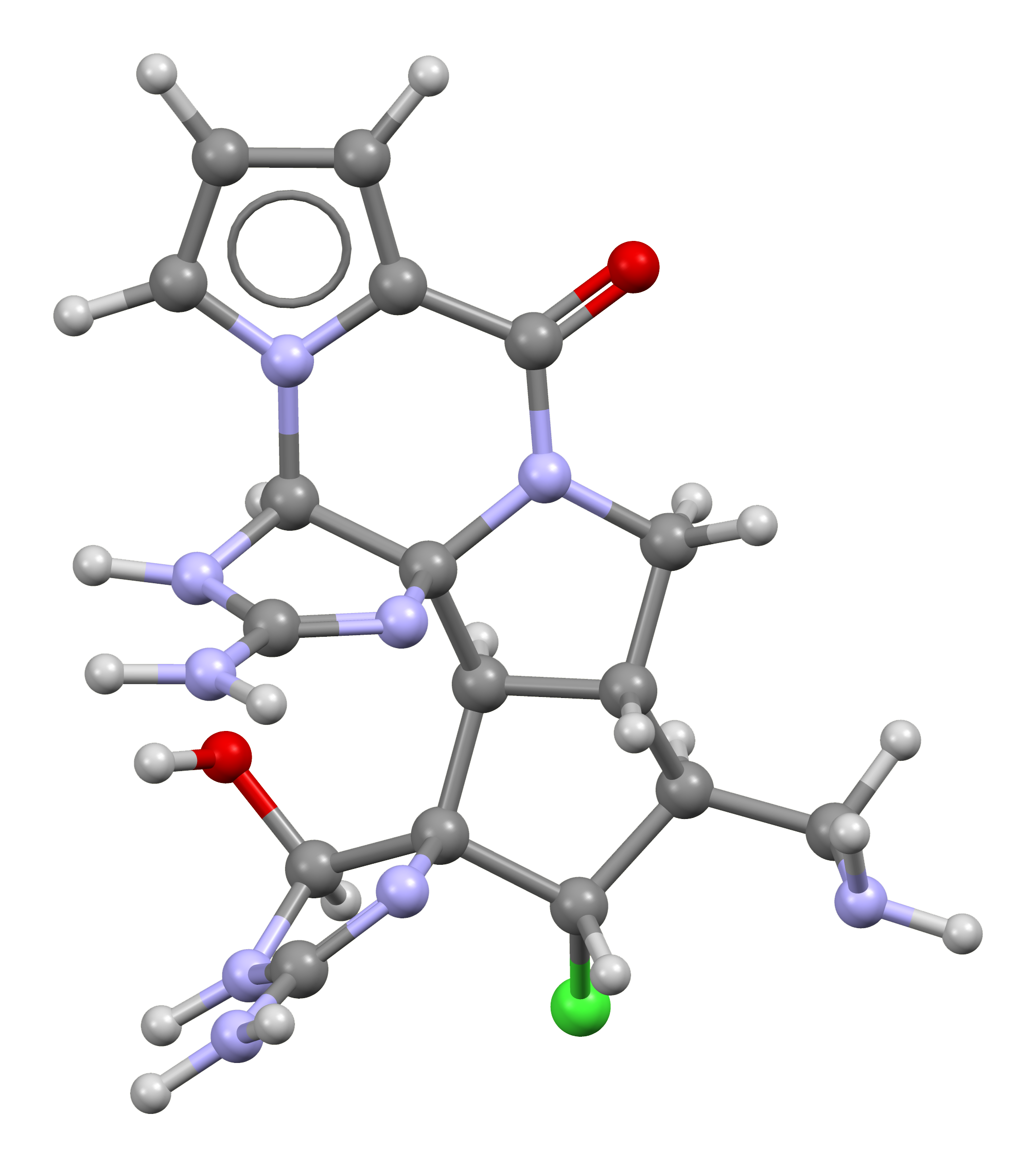

Names
- Preferred IUPAC name (3aR,4′R,5′S,10aS,11S,12S,13aS,13bR)-2,2′-Diamino-11-(aminomethyl)-12-chloro-5′-hydroxy-1,1′,3a,5′,10a,11,12,13a-octahydro-8H,10H-spiro[cyclopenta[3,4]pyrrolo[1,2-a]imidazo[4,5-b]pyrrolo[1,2-d]pyrazine-13,4′-imidazol]-8-one

Identifiers
CAS Number	148717-58-2
3D model (JSmol)	Interactive image
ChEMBL	ChEMBL2079438
ChemSpider	17279008
MeSH	C438976
PubChem CID	71308253
UNII	53Z543U79T
CompTox Dashboard (EPA)	DTXSID00745444
- InChI: InChI=1S/C17H22ClN9O2/c18-10-6(4-19)7-5-27-11(28)8-2-1-3-26(8)12-17(27,25-14(20)22-12)9(7)16(10)13(29)23-15(21)24-16/h1-3,6-7,9-10,12-13,29H,4-5,19H2,(H3,20,22,25)(H3,21,23,24)/t6-,7-,9+,10+,12+,13+,16+,17-/m1/s1 Key: VYOQBYCIIJYKJA-VORKOXQSSA-N
- SMILES: Cl[C@@H]4[C@@]1(NC(=N/[C@H]1O)\N)[C@H]3[C@@]26/N=C(\N[C@H]6n5c(C(=O)N2C[C@@H]3[C@H]4CN)ccc5)N

Properties
Chemical formula	C_{17}H_{22}ClN_{9}O_{2}
Molar mass	419.87 g·mol^{−1}
- Except where otherwise noted, data are given for materials in their standard state (at 25 °C [77 °F], 100 kPa). Infobox references

Palau'amine is a toxic chlorinated alkaloid compound synthesized naturally by certain species of sea sponges. The name of the molecule derives from the island nation of Palau, near where the first sponge species discovered to produce it, Stylotella agminata, is found. It has since been isolated in other sponges, including Stylissa massa.

The substance was first isolated from Stylotella agminata, a sponge found in the southwest Pacific Ocean, and described in 1993. Containing nine nitrogen atoms, the molecule is considered highly complex. The precise atomic structure was pinned down in 2007, and two years later, the molecule was synthesized in the lab of Phil Baran at the Scripps Research Institute in La Jolla, California. Early efforts towards its synthesis were directed at a misassigned structure featuring a cis- rather than trans-5/5 ring fusion, an error that was made because the trans-5/5 ring system is some 6 kcal/mol less stable than the cis-configured system.

== Biomimetic synthesis ==
Based on the hypothesized biosynthesis of palau'amine, a proposed pathway to this dimeric pyrrole-imidazole alkaloid includes a key oxidation of a β-ketoester with manganese(III) acetate to initiate a cascade radical cyclization, producing an ageliferin skeleton.

== Biological effects ==
Palau'amine is a proteasome inhibitor.
