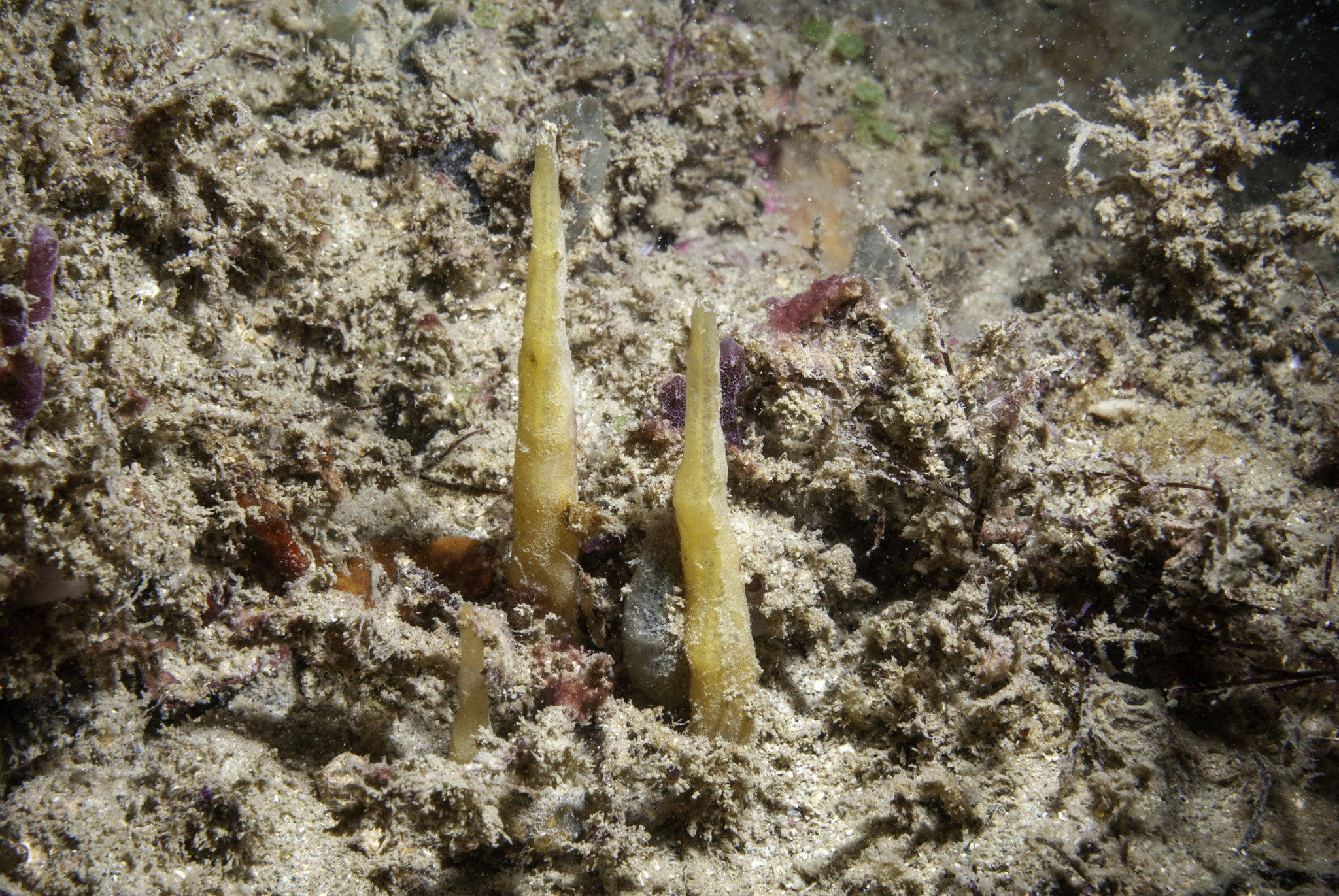
- Petromica ciocalyptoides

Scientific classification
- Kingdom: Animalia
- Phylum: Porifera
- Class: Demospongiae
- Order: Bubarida
- Family: Desmanthidae; Topsent, 1893

= Desmanthidae =

Family of sponges

Desmanthidae is a family of sponges belonging to the order Bubarida. The family is characterised by the presence of a basal layer of desma spicules.

Genera:

- Desmanthus Topsent, 1893
- Paradesmanthus Pisera & Lévi, 2002
- Petromica Topsent, 1898
  - Petromica (Chaladesma) List-Armitage & Hooper, 2002
  - Petromica (Petromica) Topsent, 1898
- Sulcastrella Schmidt, 1879
