= Macrargus multesimus =

Scientific classification
- Domain: Eukaryota
- Kingdom: Animalia
- Phylum: Arthropoda
- Subphylum: Chelicerata
- Class: Arachnida
- Order: Araneae
- Infraorder: Araneomorphae
- Family: Linyphiidae
- Genus: Macrargus
- Species: M. multesimus

Binomial name
- Macrargus multesimus (O. P.-Cambridge, 1875)

Species of spider

Macrargus multesimus is a species of sheetweb spider in the family Linyphiidae. It is found in North America, Europe, a range from Russia (European to Far East), China, and Mongolia.
