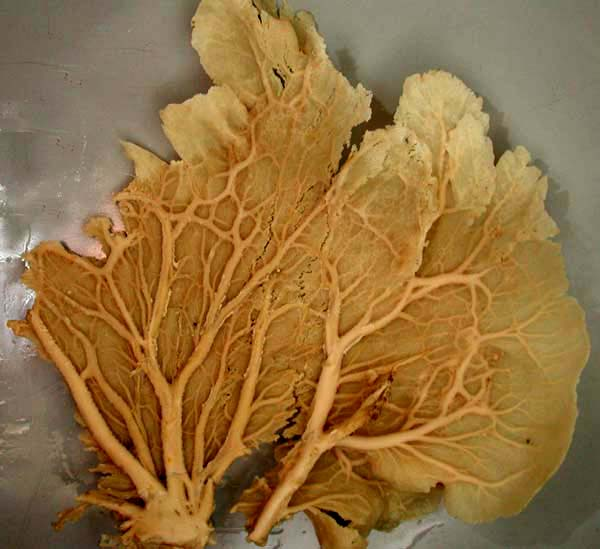
- Phakellia sp.

Scientific classification
- Kingdom: Animalia
- Phylum: Porifera
- Class: Demospongiae
- Order: Bubarida
- Family: Bubaridae; Topsent, 1894

Genera
- 6 genera (see text)

= Bubaridae =

Family of sponges

Bubaridae is a family of sponges belonging to the order Bubarida. It has a cosmopolitan distribution.

== Genera ==
There are six genera:

- Auletta Schmidt, 1870
- Bubaris Gray, 1867
- Cerbaris Topsent, 1898
- Monocrepidium Topsent, 1898
- Phakellia Bowerbank, 1862
- Rhabdobaris Pulitzer-Finali, 1983
