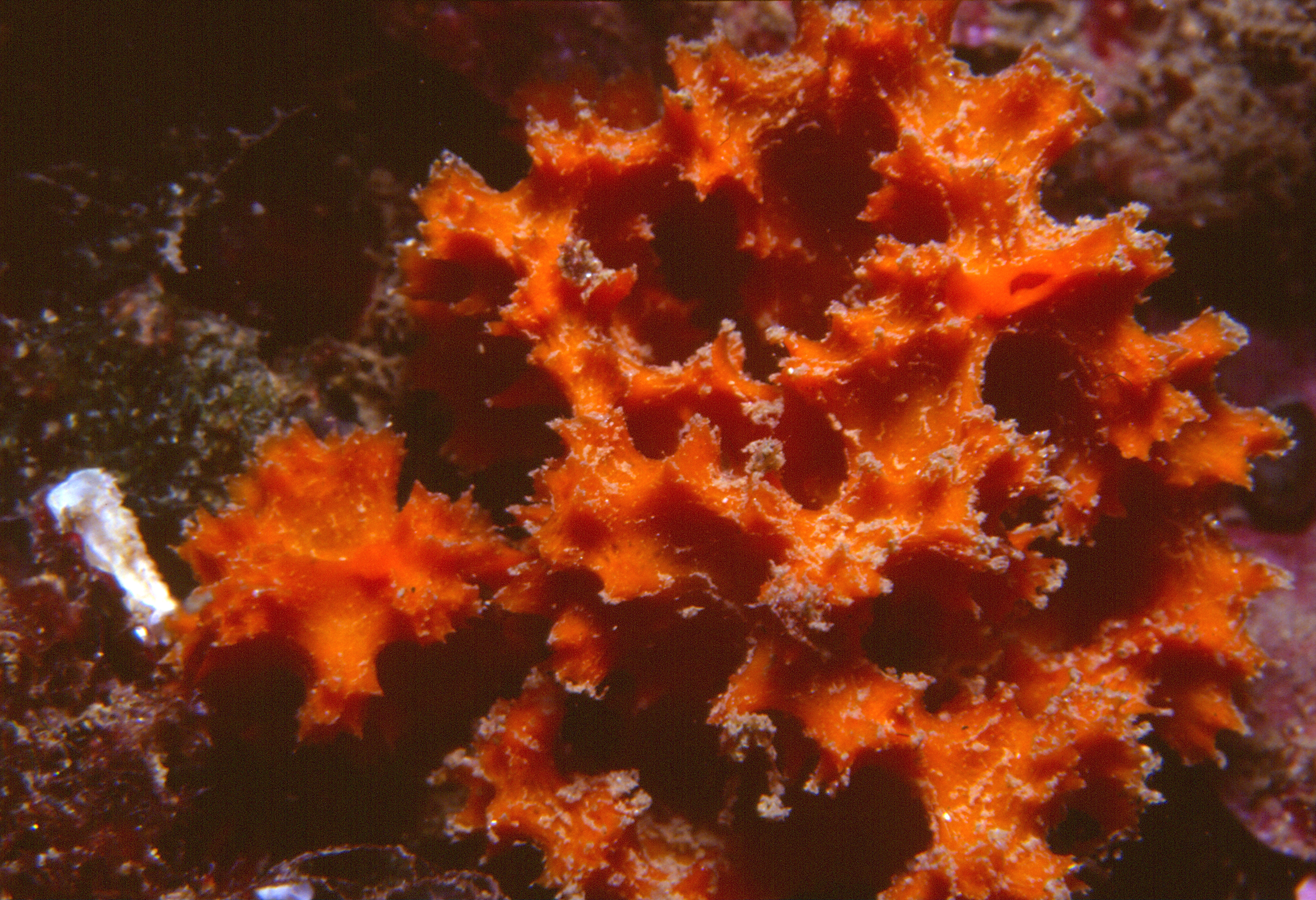
- Acanthella acuta

Scientific classification
- Kingdom: Animalia
- Phylum: Porifera
- Class: Demospongiae
- Order: Bubarida
- Family: Dictyonellidae
- Genus: Acanthella; Schmidt, 1862

= Acanthella (sponge) =

Genus of sponges

Acanthella is a genus of sponges in the family Dictyonellidae, which was first described in 1862 by Eduard Oscar Schmidt. The type species is Acanthella acuta Schmidt, 1862 (designated by Vosmaer in 1912).

== Species ==
According to the WoRMS database, accepted species are:

- Acanthella aculeata Thiele, 1898
- Acanthella acuta Schmidt, 1862
- Acanthella annulata Sarà, 1958
- Acanthella branchia Sim, Kim & Byeon, 1990
- Acanthella calyx Dendy, 1922
- Acanthella cavernosa Dendy, 1922
- Acanthella costata Kieschnick, 1900
- Acanthella cubensis (Alcolado, 1984)
- Acanthella danerii Costa, Bavestrello, Pansini & Bertolino, 2020
- Acanthella dendyi (Bergquist, 1970)
- Acanthella erecta (Carter, 1876)
- Acanthella flabellata (Tanita, 1961)
- Acanthella flagelliformis (van Soest & Stentoft, 1988)
- Acanthella gorgonoides (Thomas, 1984)
- Acanthella hispida Pulitzer-Finali, 1982
- Acanthella insignis Thiele, 1898
- Acanthella klethra Pulitzer-Finali, 1982
- Acanthella ligulata (Burton, 1928)
- Acanthella mastophora (Schmidt, 1870)
- Acanthella megaspicula Thomas, 1984
- Acanthella minuta Tanita, 1968
- Acanthella multiformis Vosmaer, 1885
- Acanthella oviforma Tanita & Hoshino, 1989
- Acanthella pulcherrima Ridley & Dendy, 1886
- Acanthella ramosa Kumar, 1925
- Acanthella ramus (Sim, Kim & Byeon, 1990)
- Acanthella simplex Thiele, 1898
- Acanthella stanleei Nascimento, Cavalcanti & Pinheiro, 2019
- Acanthella styloida Tanita & Hoshino, 1989
- Acanthella tenuispiculata Dendy, 1897
- Acanthella vaceleti van Soest & Stentoft, 1988
- Acanthella vulgata Thiele, 1898
- Acanthella xutha (de Laubenfels, 1954)
