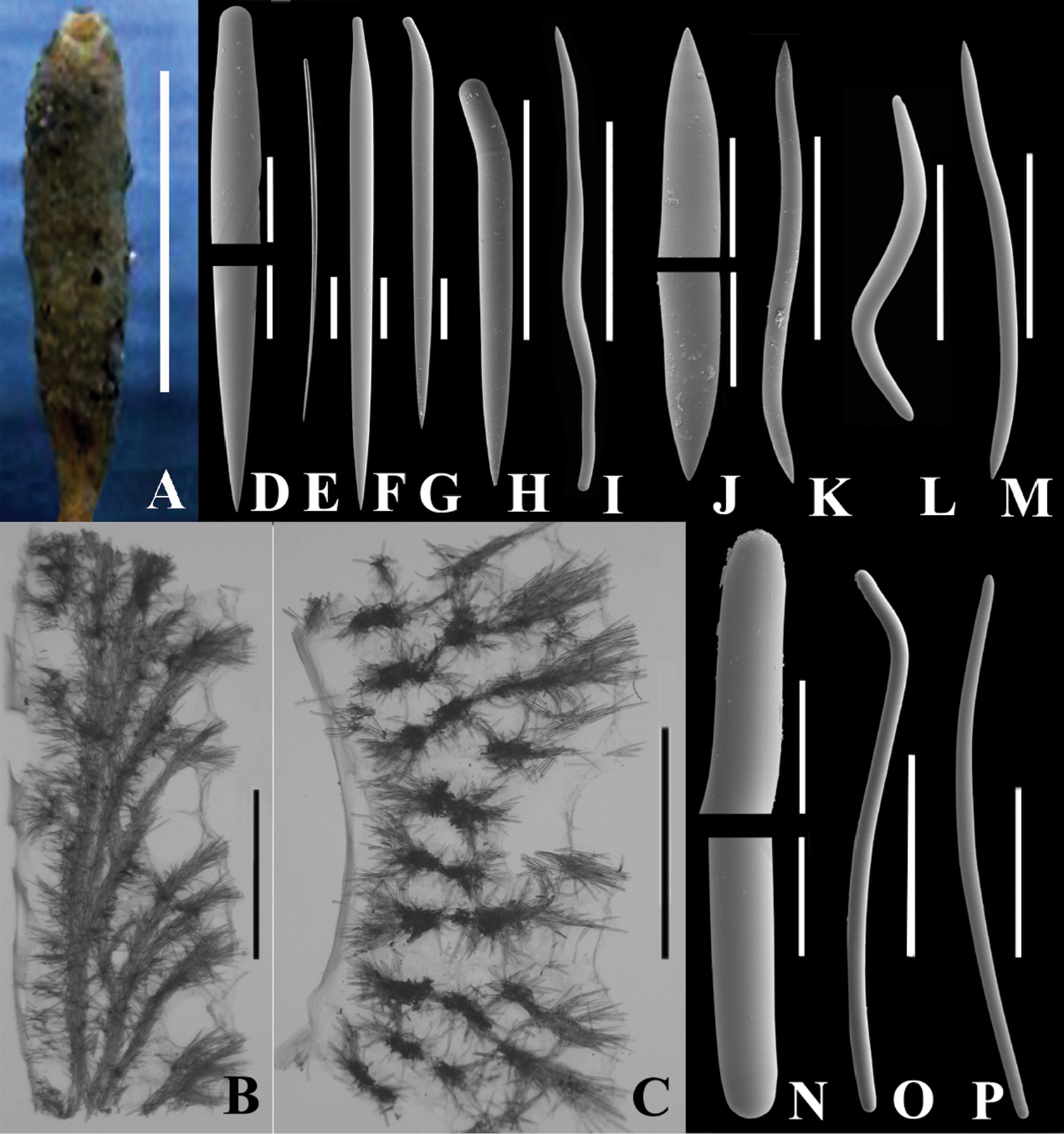
- Auletta krautteri

Scientific classification
- Domain: Eukaryota
- Kingdom: Animalia
- Phylum: Porifera
- Class: Demospongiae
- Order: Bubarida
- Family: Bubaridae
- Genus: Auletta; Schmidt, 1870

Species
- 16 species (see text)

= Auletta (sponge) =

Genus of sponges

Auletta is a genus of sponges in the family Bubaridae.

== List of species ==
This genus contains the following 16 species:

- Auletta akaroa Cavalcanti, Recinos & Pinheiro, 2017
- Auletta andamanensis Pattanayak, 2006
- Auletta aurantiaca Dendy, 1889
- Auletta consimilis Thiele, 1898
- Auletta dendrophora Wilson, 1904
- Auletta elongata Dendy, 1905
- Auletta grantioides Lévi & Vacelet, 1958
- Auletta halichondroides Thiele, 1898
- Auletta krautteri Austin, Ott, Reiswig, Romagosa & McDaniel, 2013
- Auletta laboreli Cavalcanti, Recinos & Pinheiro, 2017
- Auletta lyrata (Esper, 1794)
- Auletta pedunculata (Topsent, 1896)
- Auletta sessilis Topsent, 1904
- Auletta sycinularia Schmidt, 1870
- Auletta tuberosa Alvarez, van Soest & Rützler, 1998
- Auletta tubulosa (Ridley & Dendy, 1886)
