= Auletta (surname) =

Auletta is a surname. Notable people with the surname include:

- Gennaro Auletta (born 1957), Italian philosopher
- Ken Auletta (born 1942), American writer, journalist and media critic
- Loredana Auletta (born 1969), Italian softball player
- Pietro Auletta (1698–1771), Italian composer
