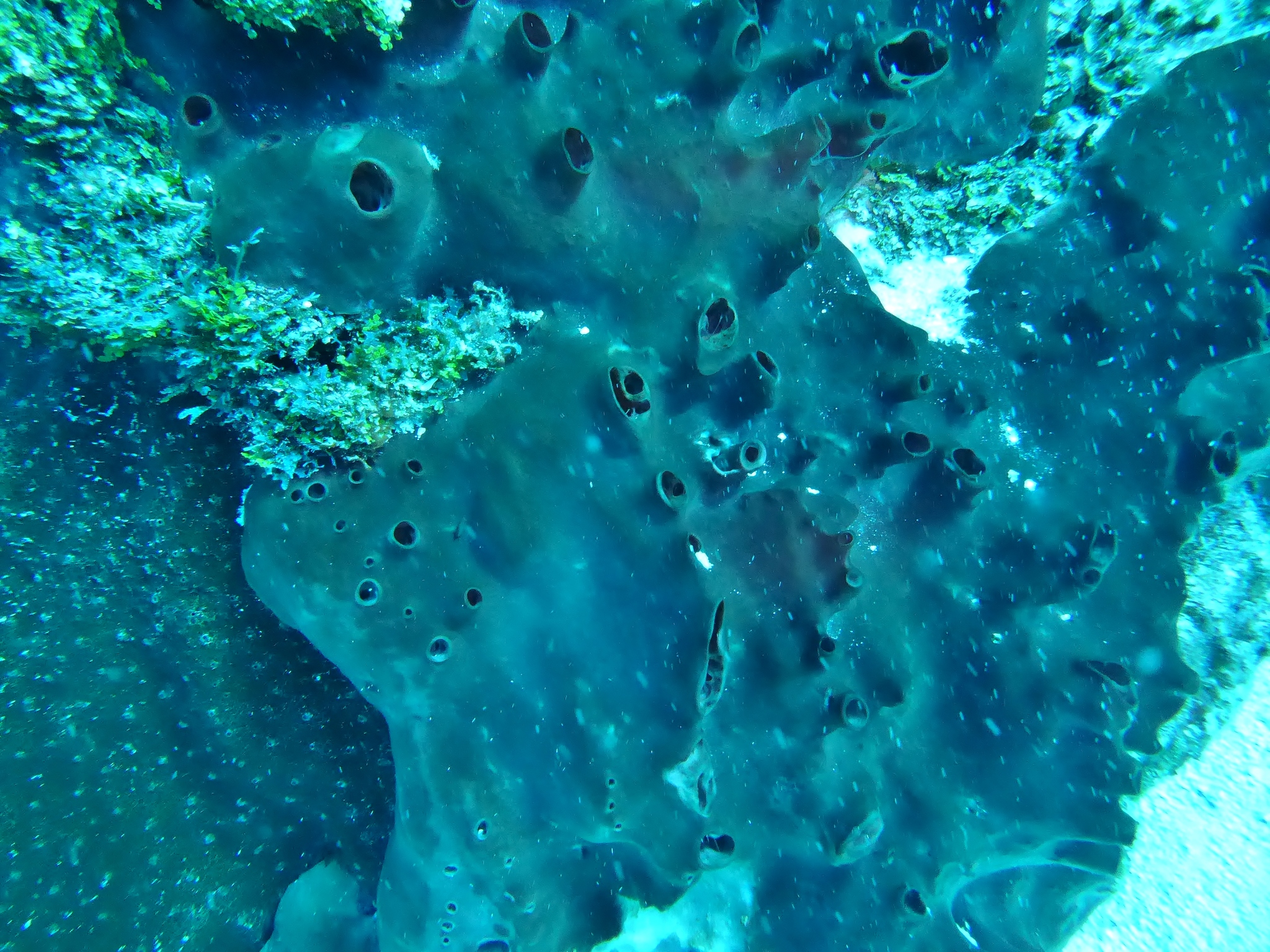
- Svenzea zeai

Scientific classification
- Kingdom: Animalia
- Phylum: Porifera
- Class: Demospongiae
- Order: Scopalinida
- Family: Scopalinidae
- Genus: Svenzea; Alvarez, van Soest & Rützler, 2002

= Svenzea =

Genus of sponges

Svenzea is a genus of sponges belonging to the family Scopalinidae, first described in 2002.

The species of this genus are found in Indonesia and Central America. The genus shows affinities with members of both Halichondrida and Haplosclerida but it is assigned to the family Dictyonellidae based on shared microanatomical and developmental features. The higher taxonomic position of Svenzea is a subject for future investigations.

Species:

- Svenzea cristinae Alvarez, van Soest & Rützler, 2002
- Svenzea devoogdae Alvarez, van Soest & Rützler, 2002
- Svenzea flava (Lehnert & van Soest, 1999)
- Svenzea germanyanezi Gómez & Calderón-Gutiérrez, 2020
- Svenzea marialmae Bautista-Guerrero, Marin-Ramirez, Carballo & Santiago-Valentín, 2026
- Svenzea tubulosa (Alcolado & Gotera, 1986)
- Svenzea weberorum Goodwin & Downey, 2021
- Svenzea zeai (Alvarez, van Soest & Rützler, 1998)
