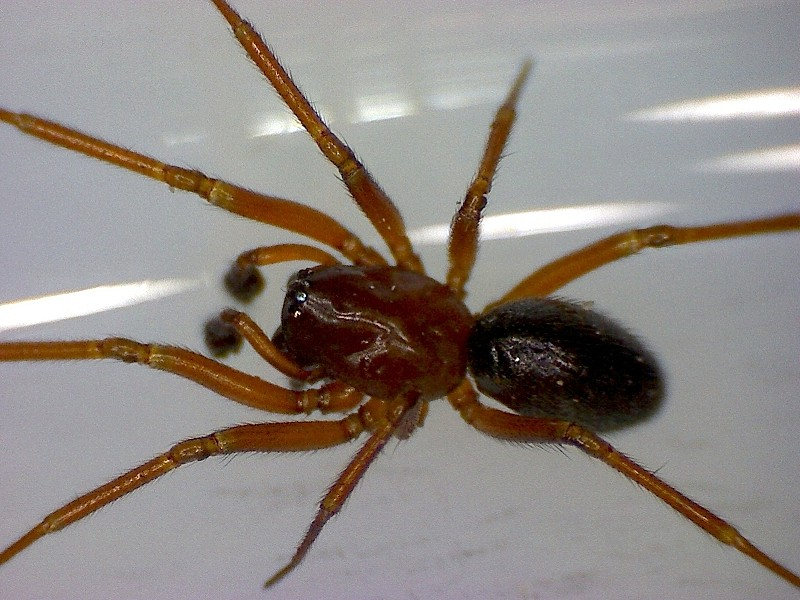
- M. rufus

Scientific classification
- Kingdom: Animalia
- Phylum: Arthropoda
- Subphylum: Chelicerata
- Class: Arachnida
- Order: Araneae
- Infraorder: Araneomorphae
- Family: Linyphiidae
- Genus: Macrargus; Dahl, 1886

Type species
- Theridion rufum Wider, 1834

Species
- 5, see text

Synonyms
- Auletta O. Pickard-Cambridge, 1882; Aulettobia Strand, 1929

= Macrargus =

Genus of spiders

Macrargus is a genus of dwarf spiders that was first described by Friedrich Dahl in 1886.

== Species ==
As of May 2021 it contains five species:

- Macrargus boreus Holm, 1968 – Sweden, Finland, Estonia, Russia
- Macrargus carpenteri (O. Pickard-Cambridge, 1895) – Europe
- Macrargus multesimus (O. Pickard-Cambridge, 1875) – North America, Europe, Russia (European to Far East), China, Mongolia
- Macrargus rufus (Wider, 1834) (type) – Europe
- Macrargus sumyensis Gnelitsa & Koponen, 2010 – Ukraine, Belarus
