= Scopalina =

Scientific classification
- Kingdom: Animalia
- Phylum: Porifera
- Class: Demospongiae
- Order: Scopalinida
- Family: Scopalinidae
- Genus: Scopalina; Schmidt, 1862

Genus of sponges

Scopalina is a genus of sponges belonging to the family Scopalinidae.

The genus has almost cosmopolitan distribution.

Species:

- Scopalina agoga (de Laubenfels, 1954)
- Scopalina australiensis (Pulitzer-Finali, 1982)
- Scopalina azurea Bibiloni, 1993
