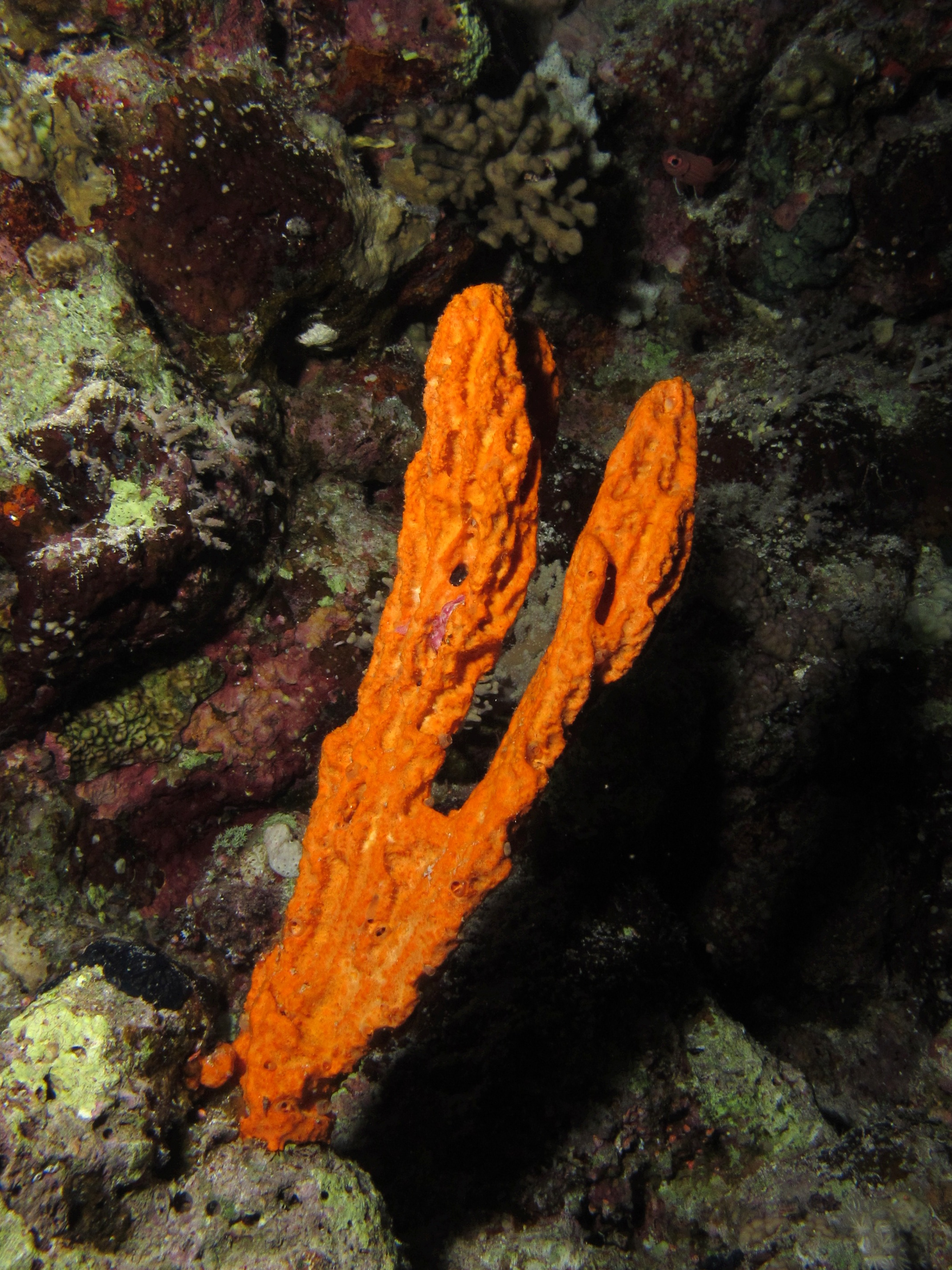
- Stylissa carteri

Scientific classification
- Domain: Eukaryota
- Kingdom: Animalia
- Phylum: Porifera
- Class: Demospongiae
- Order: Scopalinida
- Family: Scopalinidae
- Genus: Stylissa; Hallmann, 1914

Species
- See text

= Stylissa =

Genus of sponges

Stylissa is a genus of sponges in the family Scopalinidae.

== Species ==
- Stylissa acanthelloides Lévi, 1961
- Stylissa caribica Lehnert & van Soest, 1998
- Stylissa carteri Dendy, 1889
- Stylissa constricta Pulitzer-Finali, 1982
- Stylissa conulosa Dendy, 1922
- Stylissa flabelliformis Hentschel, 1912
- Stylissa flexibilis Lévi, 1961
- Stylissa haurakii Brøndsted, 1924
- Stylissa inflexa Pulitzer-Finali, 1982
- Stylissa letra Dickinson, 1945
- Stylissa massa Carter, 1887
- Stylissa vernonensis Hooper, Cook, Hobbs & Kennedy, 1997
