= Spongiacidin =

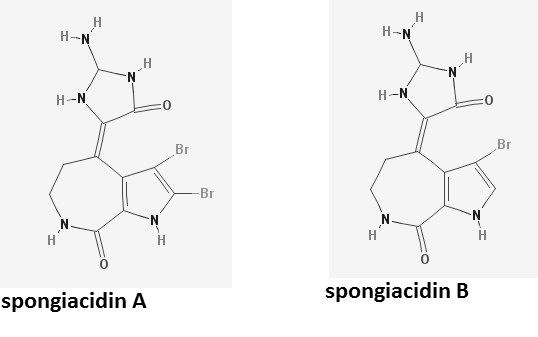
Spongiacidin A and B

Spongiacidins are bio-active isolates of marine sponge.

Spongiacidin C has been found to act as a USP7 inhibitor.
