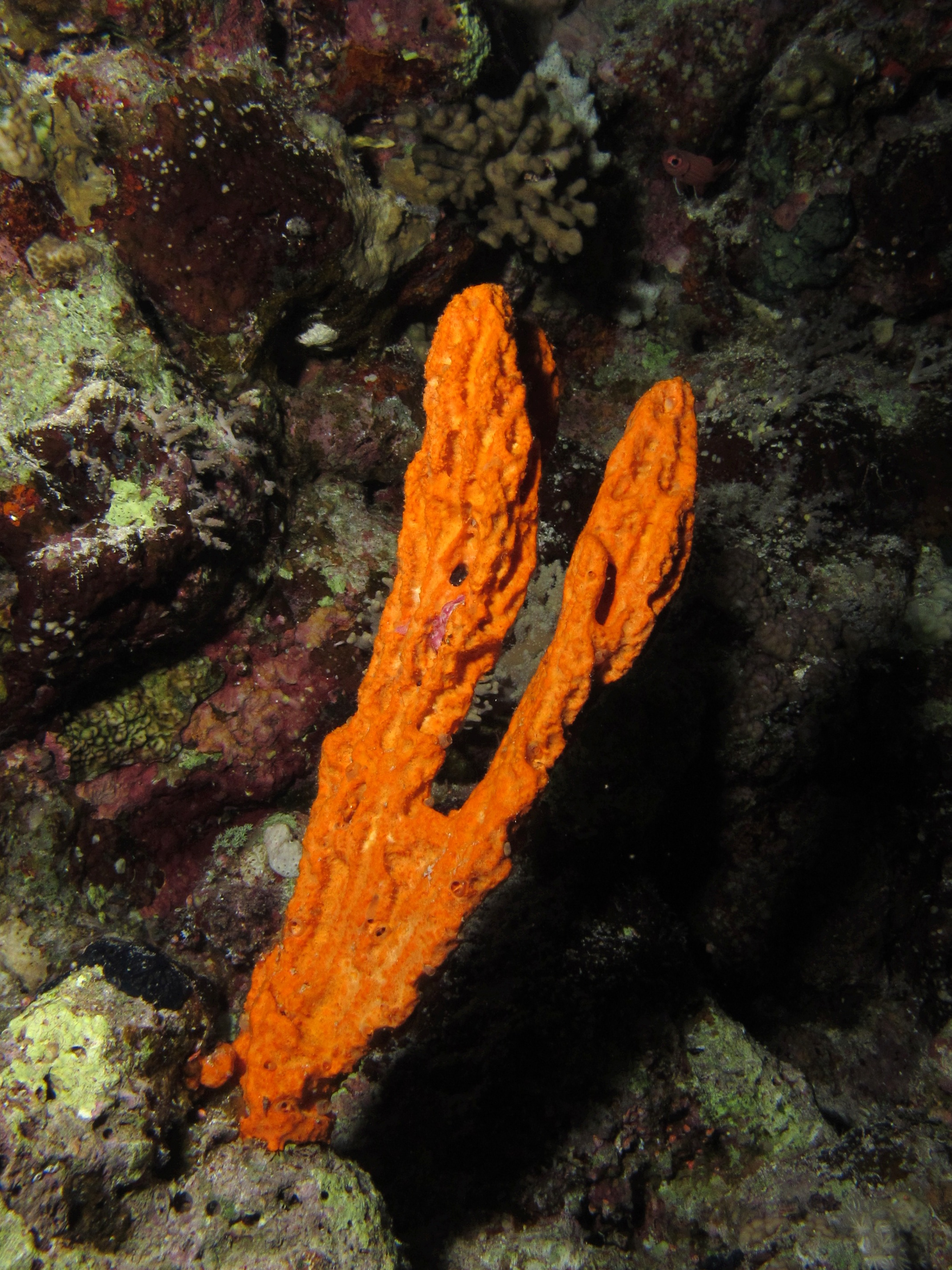

Scientific classification
- Domain: Eukaryota
- Kingdom: Animalia
- Phylum: Porifera
- Class: Demospongiae
- Order: Scopalinida
- Family: Scopalinidae
- Genus: Stylissa
- Species: S. carteri

Binomial name
- Stylissa carteri Dendy, 1889

Synonyms
- Acanthella aurantiaca Keller, 1889; Acanthella carteri Dendy, 1889; Axinella carteri (Dendy, 1889); Phakellia carteri (Dendy, 1889)

= Stylissa carteri =

Elephant ear sponge

Species of sponge

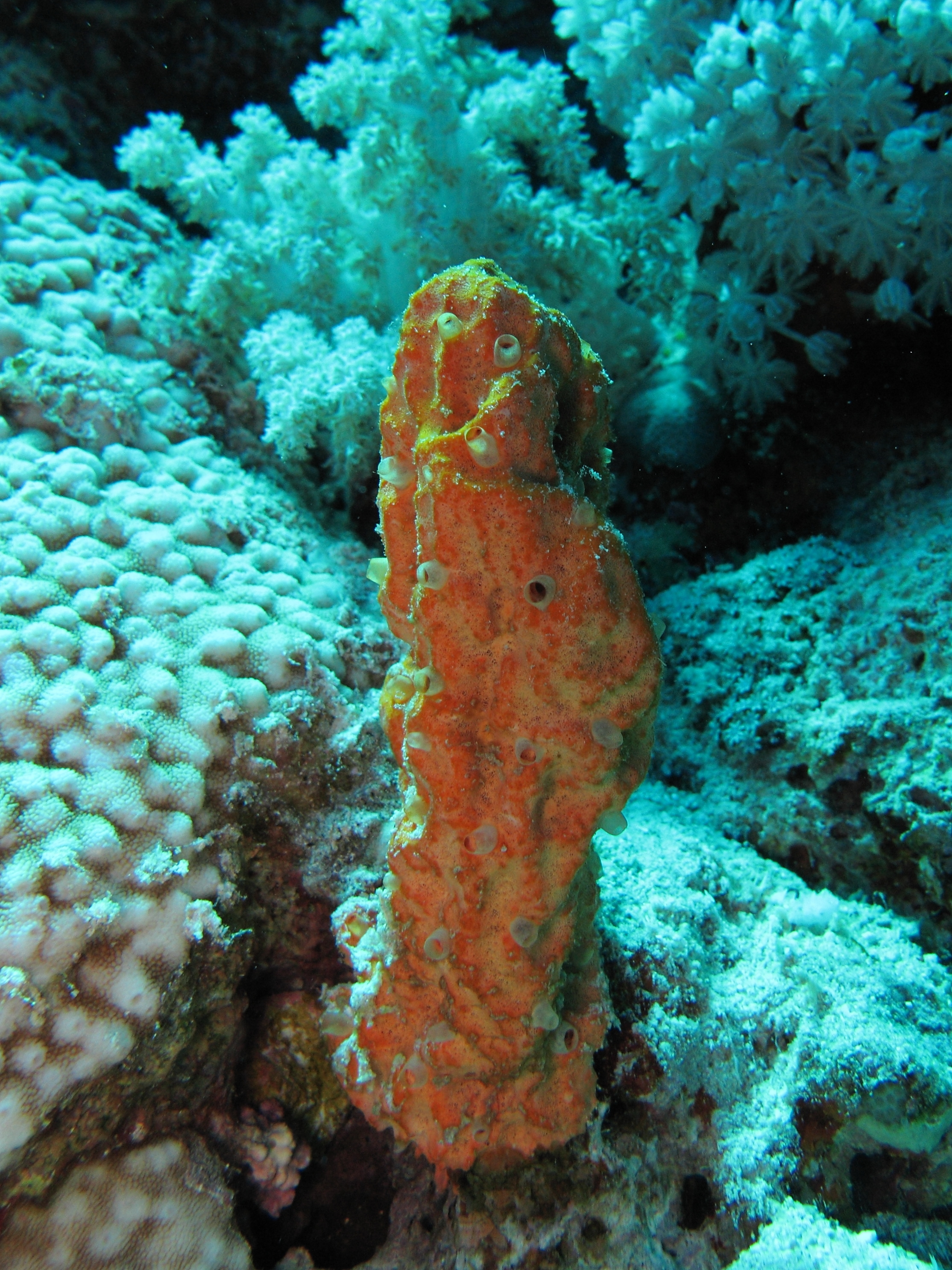
Stylissa carteri (Red Sea, Egypt)

Stylissa carteri, commonly known as elephant ear sponge, is a species of sponge found from the Red Sea to Australia. Its robust, usually free-standing, yellowish-orange body with many spicules grows up to 50 centimetres (20 in) in size.
