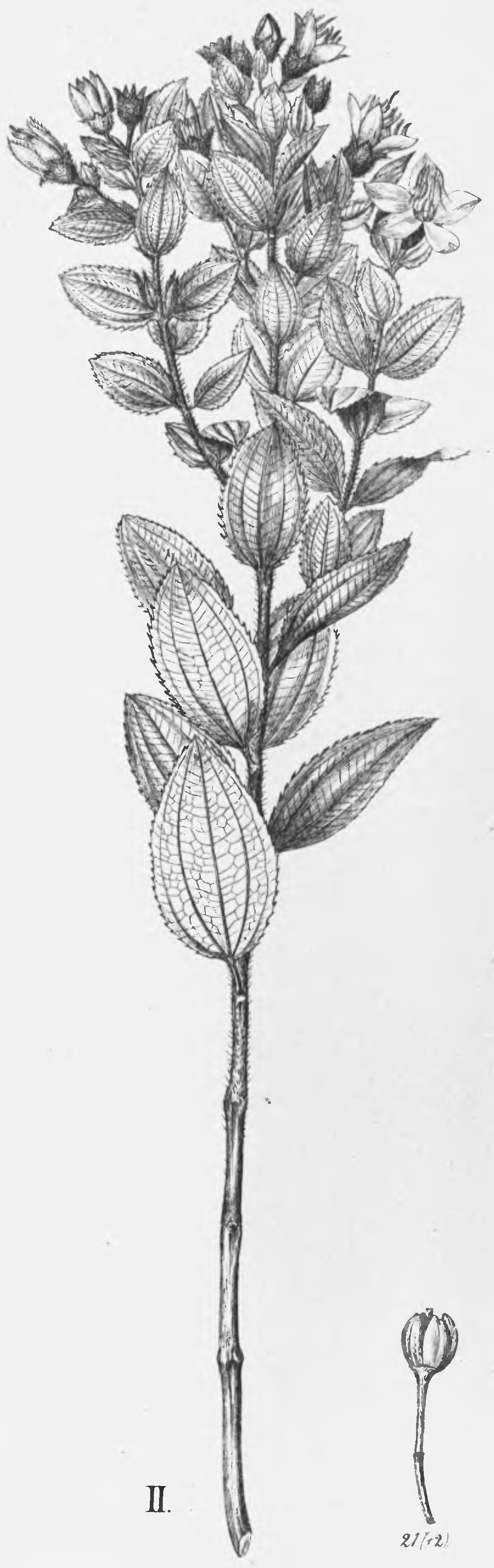
- Acanthella conferta

Scientific classification
- Kingdom: Plantae
- Clade: Tracheophytes
- Clade: Angiosperms
- Clade: Eudicots
- Clade: Rosids
- Order: Myrtales
- Family: Melastomataceae
- Genus: Acanthella; Hook.f.

Species
- See text

= Acanthella (plant) =

Genus of flowering plants

Acanthella is a genus of two species of flowering plants in the family Melastomataceae. This genus is native to tropical South America.

Species

- Acanthella pulchra Gleason. Venezuela
- Acanthella sprucei Hook.f. Brazil
