= Loredana Auletta =

Italian softball player (born 1969)

- Catcher
- Born: May 1, 1969 (age 55); Modena, Emilia-Romagna, Italy
- Bats: right Throws: right

Teams
- Italian National National: Italian National Team

Career highlights and awards
- 2000 Summer Olympics

Loredana Auletta (born 1 May 1969) is an Italian softball player who competed in the 2000 Summer Olympics in Sydney, Australia. Auletta was the catcher for the two winning games (against Cuba and New Zealand) that Italy played in the Sydney Games.

== Personal life ==
Loredana Auletta was born on 1 May 1969 in Modena, Emilia-Romagna, Italy. Audetta is married to Pier Piancastelli, a former baseball outfielder. In 1996, she gave birth to their twin daughters. Their daughter Erika Piancastelli was the captain of the Italian National Team (softball), for which she played as the catcher in the XXXII Olympiad in Tokyo.
