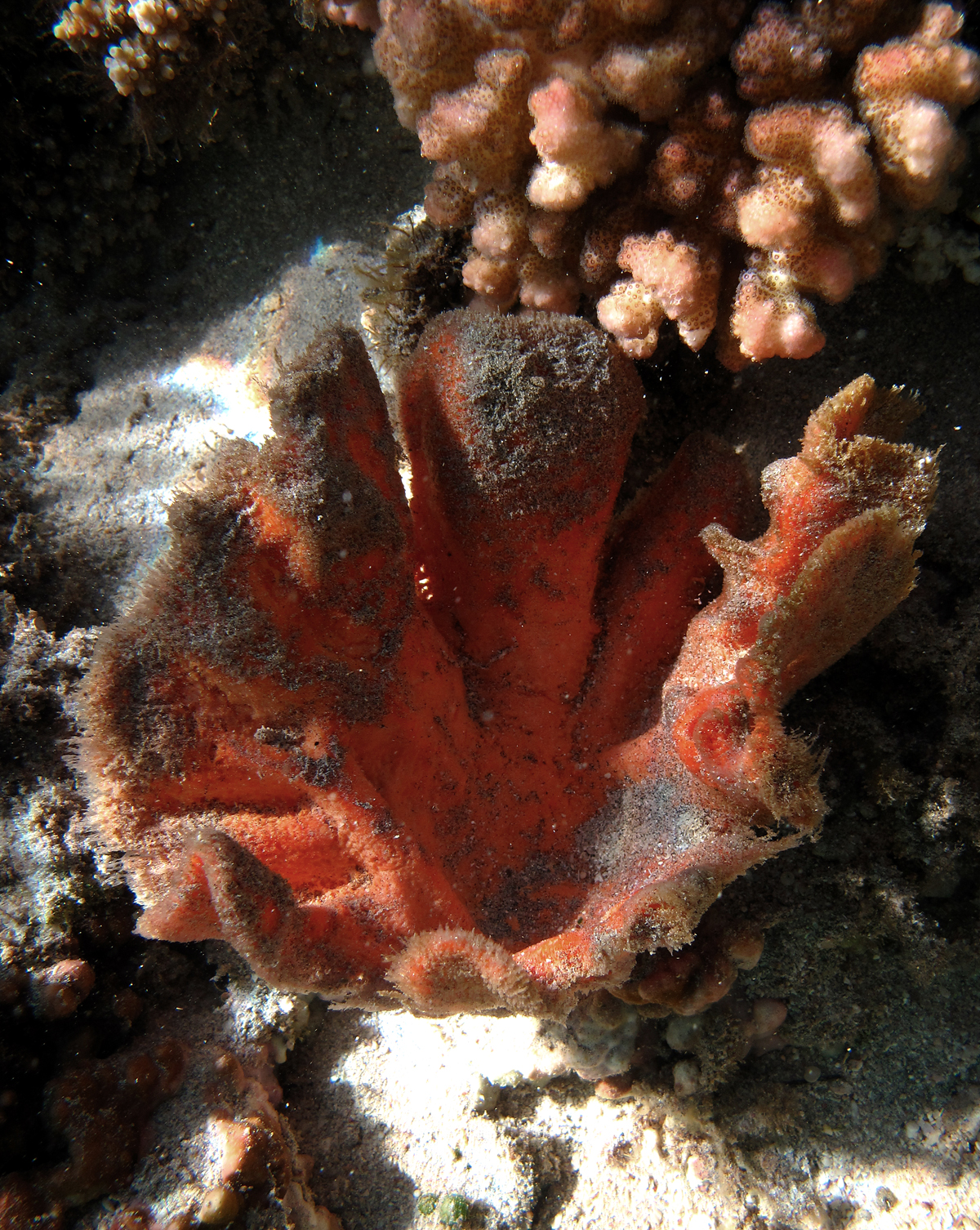
- Stylissa carteri

Scientific classification
- Kingdom: Animalia
- Phylum: Porifera
- Class: Demospongiae
- Order: Scopalinida; Morrow & Cárdenas, 2015
- Family: Scopalinidae; Morrow, Picton, Erpenbeck, Boury-Esnault, Maggs & Allcock, 2012

Genera
- Scopalina Schmidt, 1862; Stylissa Hallmann, 1914; Svenzea Alvarez, van Soest & Rützler, 2002

= Scopalinidae =

Family of sponges

Scopalinidae is a family of demosponges in the subclass Heteroscleromorpha. It is the only family in the monotypic order Scopalinida.
