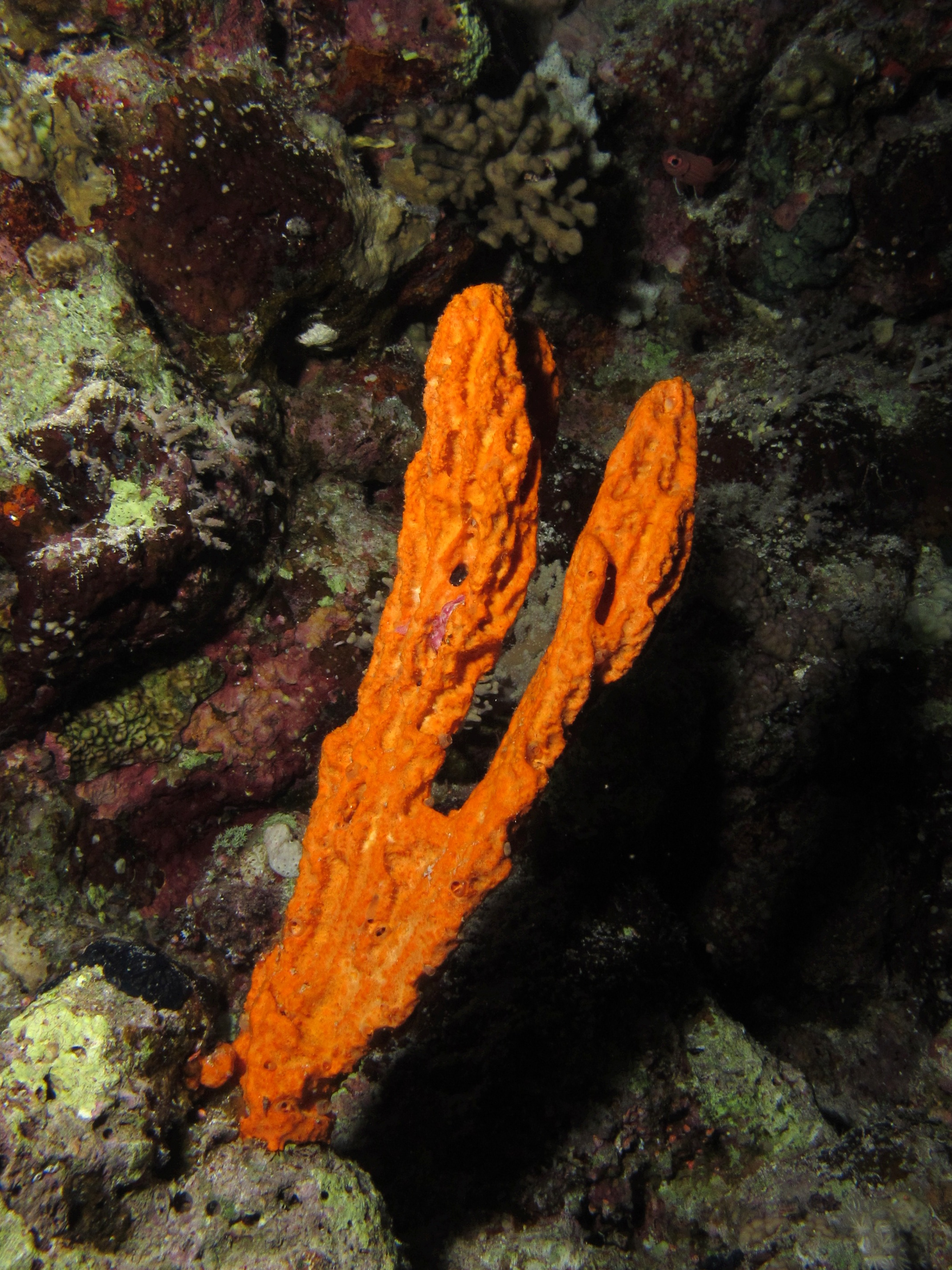
- Stylissa carteri

Scientific classification
- Kingdom: Animalia
- Phylum: Porifera
- Class: Demospongiae
- Subclass: Heteroscleromorpha
- Order: Bubarida; Morrow & Cárdenas, 2015

Families
- Bubaridae Topsent, 1894; Desmanthidae Topsent, 1893; Dictyonellidae van Soest, Diaz & Pomponi, 1990

= Bubarida =

Order of sponges

Bubarida is an order of demosponges in the subclass Heteroscleromorpha.
