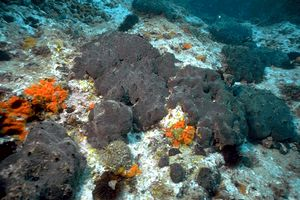

Conservation status
- Endangered (IUCN 3.1) (Mediterranean)

Scientific classification
- Kingdom: Animalia
- Phylum: Porifera
- Class: Demospongiae
- Order: Dictyoceratida
- Family: Spongiidae
- Genus: Spongia
- Species: S. officinalis

Binomial name
- Spongia officinalis Linnaeus, 1759

Synonyms
- List: Euspongia officinalis (Linnaeus, 1759); Spongia adriatica Schmidt, 1862; Spongia (Spongia) officinalis Linnaeus, 1759; Spongia quarnerensis Schmidt, 1862

= Spongia officinalis =

Species of sponge

Spongia officinalis, better known as a species of bath sponge, is a commercially used sea sponge. Individuals grow in large lobes with small openings and are formed by a mesh of primary and secondary fibres. It is light grey to black in colour. It is found throughout the Mediterranean Sea up to 100 metres deep on rocky or sandy surfaces.

Spongia officinalis can reproduce both asexually, through budding or fragmentation, or sexually. Individuals can be dioecious or sequential hermaphrodites. The free-swimming larvae are lecithotrophic and grow slowly after attaching to a benthic surface.

Humans use and interact with S. officinalis in a variety of ways. Harvested sponges have been used throughout history for many purposes, including washing and painting. Over-harvesting and sponge disease have led to a decrease in population. Sponge fishing practices have slowly changed over time as new technology has developed and sponge farming is now in use to decrease stress on wild S. officinalis populations. Sponge farming is also recommended as a solution to reducing marine organic pollution, especially from fish farms.

== Anatomy and morphology ==
Spongia officinalis grows in massive, globular lobes with fine openings which are slightly elevated and have cone-shaped voids (conules). Oscula can either be scattered or at the tip of the lobes.

Spongia officinalis have an ectosomal skeleton composed of primary and secondary fibres. Together, they form the conulose openings. The sponge also contains a choanosomal skeleton, which consists of a dense, irregular mesh of polygons formed by secondary fibres and primary fibres rise from it. The primary fibres are 50 to 100 nanometres in diameter and are composed of spongin and inclusions such as sand grains and spicules. The secondary fibres are 20 to 35 nanometres in diameter and are composed of only spongin without inclusions.

Spongia officinalis is light grey to black in colour.

== Distribution and habitat ==
Spongia officinalis can be found in the Mediterranean Sea along the coasts of Croatia, Greece, the Aegean islands, Turkey, Cyprus, Syria, Egypt, Libya, Tunisia, Italy, France and Spain.

They are distributed in shallow water (1 to 10 metres below the surface) down to 100 metres deep. They will grow on littoral rocky surfaces, sandy bottoms, and vertical walls in well-oxygenated water.

== Reproduction ==
Spongia officinalis can reproduce asexually via budding or fragmentation.

Sexual reproduction is also common in S. officinalis. Individuals can be dioecious, either male or female, or sequential hermaphrodites, meaning they can alternate between male and female. Successive hermaphroditism can take place within one reproductive season. Sperm is formed in spermatic cysts and is free spawned into the surrounding water. Sperm is captured by females and is transported to oocytes within the sponge where fertilization takes place. The occurrence of sexual reproduction peaks from October to November. There is no relationship between age and reproductive ability in S. officinalis.

=== Life cycle ===
After fertilization, S. officinalis embryos develop in choanosomal tissue of the female sponge. Cleavage of cells begins after fertilization, around November, and is total and equal. By May, a stereoblastula, or a blastula without a clear central cavity, forms. From May to July, parenchymella larva, or larva which is a mass of cells enveloped in flagellated cells, develop. These larvae are released from the adult from June to July. Like all sponges, S. officinalis larvae are lecithotrophic, meaning they cannot feed as larva and instead rely on energy reserves provided by the mother. Therefore, they only remain as a free-floating larva for a short period before settling on a benthic surface where they grow into an adult sponge.

== Taxonomy ==
Spongia officinalis was first described by Carl Linnaeus in 1759. The common names "bath sponge," "Fina Dalmata," and "Matapas" are usually used to refer to this species.

== Human uses and interactions ==
=== Uses ===
The use of bath sponges for bathing and other purposes originated in Greece and spread all around Europe during the Middle Ages. From there, the use of sponges spread further, with Mediterranean bath sponges currently being shipped globally. S. officinalis was used by humans in many ways in the past. Aside from using the sponge for washing, some of these uses included padding in Roman soldiers helmets, as absorbent material during surgeries, as medicine to help digestive issues, and as a primitive "contraceptive sponge". Today, sponges are still used for washing and are also used for recreational purposes, like sponge painting.

=== Fishing practices ===
Sponge fishing in the Mediterranean has been in practice since ancient times. Aristotle even wrote of it around 350 BC. Traditionally, sponge fishing was practiced by Greeks who dove underwater to collect specimens. The practice remained this way until the late 19th century. There was a small increase in sponge fishing at the end of the 19th century due to the invention of a new diving suit, but the suit was not very safe so sponge fishing did not grow much in popularity. Around 1910 to 1930, an underwater breathing device was created and, since then, this method of sponge fishing has continually grown in popularity.

Sponges can also be collected after they wash up on beaches or they can be fished from a boat.

=== Farming ===
As S. officinalis populations declined due to over-harvest, as discussed below, interest in cultivation increased. Towards the end of the 19th century, the first sponge farming attempts were made in the Mediterranean Sea by fixing sponge fragments onto wooden boxes and setting them into suitable habitats. Although the efforts were successful, sponge farming activity did not increase significantly until the end of the 20th century and currently, it is performed worldwide.

Sponge farming not only decreases stress on S. officinalis populations, it also can be used as a sustainable method to reduce marine organic pollution because, sponges being filter feeders, they efficiently remove organic suspended particles from water. For this reason, sponge cultivation in combination with fish farming has been recommended as a method to reduce organic pollution from fish farms.

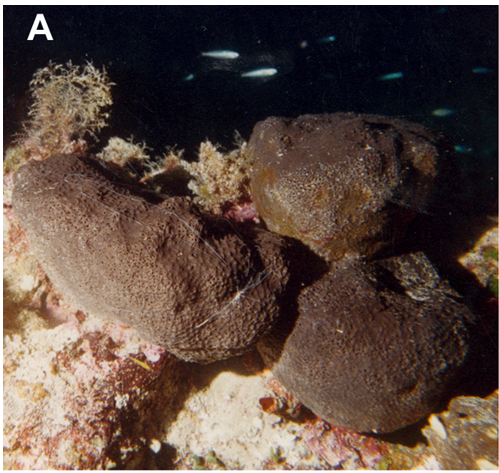
A Spongia officinalis specimen.

== Conservation status ==
Over-harvesting and sponge disease have led to a decrease in Mediterranean S. officinalis populations. People have harvested sponges in the Mediterranean since ancient times. Growing demand has led to overexploitation of these sponges. Beginning in the 1980s, populations of S. officinalis in the Mediterranean have significantly declined. In addition to this, a sponge disease caused by pathogenic bacteria and fungi has further reduced populations. The bacteria and fungi destroy tissues and fibres of the sponges, making them weak. Due to the regenerative abilities of these sponges, they are able to set aside infected tissue and recover. But, when the effects of the disease are compounded by the effects of over-harvesting, populations have struggled to recover and local extinctions have occurred.
