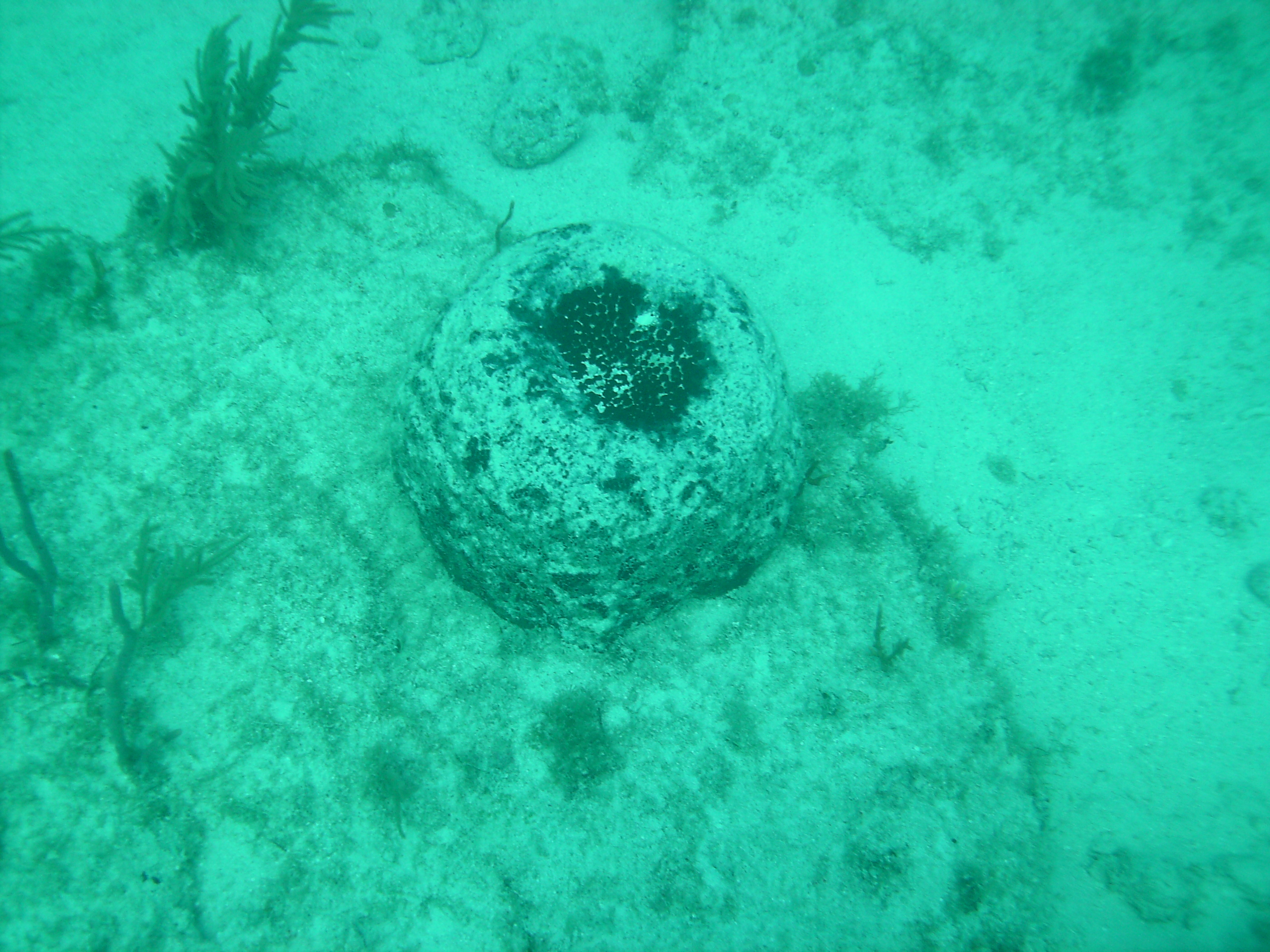

Scientific classification
- Kingdom: Animalia
- Phylum: Porifera
- Class: Demospongiae
- Order: Dictyoceratida
- Family: Irciniidae
- Genus: Ircinia
- Species: I. strobilina

Binomial name
- Ircinia strobilina (Lamarck, 1816)

Synonyms
- List: Dysidicinia longispina (Duchassaing & Michelotti, 1864); Filifera verrucosa Lieberkühn, 1859; Hircinia (Dysidicinia) longispina (Duchassaing & Michelotti, 1864); Hircinia (Psammocinia) verrucosa (Lieberkühn, 1859); Hircinia acuta (Duchassaing & Michelotti, 1864); Hircinia strobilina (Lamarck, 1814); Hircinia verrucosa (Lieberkhün, 1859); Ircinia acuta (Duchassaing & Michelotti, 1864); Ircinia linguiformis (Duchassaing & Michelotti, 1864); Ircinia longispina (Duchassaing & Michelotti, 1864); Ircinia verrucosa (Lieberkühn, 1869); Polytherses capitata Duchassaing & Michelotti, 1864; Polytherses cylindrica Duchassaing & Michelotti, 1864; Polytherses ignobilis Duchassaing & Michelotti, 1864; Polytherses linguiformis Duchassaing & Michelotti, 1864; Polytherses longispina Duchassaing & Michelotti, 1864; Spongia strobilina Lamarck, 1816; Stelospongos longispinus (Duchassaing & Michelotti, 1864)

= Ircinia strobilina =

Species of sponge

Ircinia strobilina is a species of sponge in the family Irciniidae. It is grey or shiny black in colour, with spiny structures (conules) dotting the surface. The spiny structures are interconnected by ridges, though not arranged in an orderly lattice. This species is globular and massive in shape, but usually no more than 0.3 metres (1 ft) across. I. strobilina is lobed and spherical and has a tough consistency. The large excurrent pores are located in depressions at the top of the sponge. Many smaller incurrent pores are scattered across the surface, more densely at the sides.

I. strobilina inhabits marine waters, specifically those of the Caribbean Sea including off the coast of Florida, the Virgin Islands, Cuba and Venezuela. It is found in warm, shallow water, anchored to a substrate. This species is the most abundant sponge in the Abrolhos reef, where it grows exposed to many predatory fishes. The predatory fishes avoid I. strobilina, for reasons discussed below.

I. strobilina has been found to have chemical defences against predation by fishes: when force-fed with it in a study of three sponge species, the fish Holacanthus tricolor was temporarily paralysed and exhibited a loss of balance. The chemicals involved in repelling predators have been extracted and identified as the metabolite and sesterterpene variabilin, and its isomer strobilin. The same study concluded that I. strobilina forms scar tissue over lesions more quickly than the other species studied, Neofibularia nolitangere and Agelas clathrodes.

== Synonyms ==
When first described, Lamarck initially speculated the specimen (originally described as Spongia strobilina) could have originated in the Mediterranean. Later authors had posited that it was an Australian species until M. W. de Laubenfels identified it as a Caribbean species.
