= Coscinoderma sporadense =

Conservation status
- Vulnerable (IUCN 3.1)

Scientific classification
- Kingdom: Animalia
- Phylum: Porifera
- Class: Demospongiae
- Order: Dictyoceratida
- Family: Spongiidae
- Genus: Coscinoderma
- Species: C. sporadense

Binomial name
- Coscinoderma sporadense Voultsiadou-Koukoura, van Soest & Koukouras, 1991

Species of sponge

Coscinoderma sporadense is a marine sponge in the family Spongiidae.
