= Ircinia chevreuxi =

Conservation status
- Near Threatened (IUCN 3.1)

Scientific classification
- Kingdom: Animalia
- Phylum: Porifera
- Class: Demospongiae
- Order: Dictyoceratida
- Family: Irciniidae
- Genus: Ircinia
- Species: I. chevreuxi

Binomial name
- Ircinia chevreuxi (Topsent, 1894)

Species of sponge

Ircinia chevreuxi is a species of sea sponge in the family Irciniidae.
