= Spongia zimocca =

Conservation status
- Endangered (IUCN 3.1)

Scientific classification
- Kingdom: Animalia
- Phylum: Porifera
- Class: Demospongiae
- Order: Dictyoceratida
- Family: Spongiidae
- Genus: Spongia
- Species: S. zimocca

Binomial name
- Spongia zimocca Schmidt, 1862

Species of sea sponge

Spongia zimocca, the leather sponge, is an endangered species of sponge found in coastal regions of the Mediterranean Sea.
