= Black stink sponge =

black stink sponge

Scientific classification
- Kingdom: Animalia
- Phylum: Porifera
- Class: Demospongiae
- Order: Dictyoceratida
- Family: Irciniidae
- Genus: Ircinia
- Species: I. arbuscula

Binomial name
- Ircinia arbuscula (Hyatt, 1877)

Synonyms
- Hircinia arbuscula Hyatt, 1877

Species of sponge

The black stink sponge (Ircinia arbuscula), is a species of sea sponge in the family Irciniidae. This sponge is known around the Australian coast and around South Africa from the Cape Peninsula to Cape Agulhas.

== Description ==
The black stink sponge grows in crusts of 1–2 cm thick and 10–20 cm across. It is a black encrusting sponge which forms a mat on rocks. Its surface is textured, and the sponge is firm and slippery to touch. Its oscula are inconspicuous. When collected, the smell is distinctive.

== Habitat ==
This sponge lives on rocky reefs subtidally down to 180m.
