= Ircinia bergquistia =

Scientific classification
- Kingdom: Animalia
- Phylum: Porifera
- Class: Demospongiae
- Order: Dictyoceratida
- Family: Irciniidae
- Genus: Ircinia
- Species: I. bergquistia

Binomial name
- Ircinia bergquistia Sim, Lee & Kim, 2016

Species of sponge

Ircinia bergquistia is a species of sea sponge in the family Irciniidae. It was first described in 2016 by Korean spongiologists, Chung-Ja Sim, Kyung Jin Lee and Kim, from a specimen collected at a depth of 20 m by a scuba dive. The species epithet honours New Zealand spongiologist, Patricia Bergquist.

It is a dark-grey, compressible, irregular, thick-walled sponge measuring 8 cm by 9 cm by 4 cm. It has been found off Seogwipo-si, Jeju-do, Korea.
