= Ircinia spiculosa =

Scientific classification
- Kingdom: Animalia
- Phylum: Porifera
- Class: Demospongiae
- Order: Dictyoceratida
- Family: Irciniidae
- Genus: Ircinia
- Species: I. spiculosa

Binomial name
- Ircinia spiculosa (Hentschel, 1912)

Synonyms
- Hircinia spiculosa Hentschel, 1912

Species of sponge

Ircinia spiculosa is a marine sponge species in the genus Ircinia.

Tryptophol, a plant auxin, can also be isolated from the marine sponge I. spinulosa.
