= Hippospongia communis =

Conservation status
- Endangered (IUCN 3.1) (Mediterranean)

Scientific classification
- Kingdom: Animalia
- Phylum: Porifera
- Class: Demospongiae
- Order: Dictyoceratida
- Family: Spongiidae
- Genus: Hippospongia
- Species: H. communis

Binomial name
- Hippospongia communis (Lamarck, 1814)

Species of sponge

Hippospongia communis also known as the honeycomb bath sponge, is a marine sponge in the phylum Porifera.

Hippospongia communis is a brown or darker colour and very porous, due to its many oscules, and is commonly found in shallow waters of the Mediterranean. Throughout history, H. communis has been used for cleaning, medicine, and cooking. Along with being used for domestic purposes, the bath sponge has been used in many scientific studies.

== Environment ==
The most common areas that Hippospongia communis inhabit are marine waters, mostly in the Western Mediterranean or the South Aegean Sea. Specifically in the Mediterranean, the Hippospongia communis is the most common sponge. The sponge settles on rocky or muddy bottoms and it is common to find them in ocean caves. Hippospongia communis like being in shallow water, around 15 m deep. The few individual H. communis that are found at the deeper depths are typically older.

=== History ===
Hippospongia communis has many oscules that are scattered and grouped along the top of the sponge. Its porous structure and spongey exterior made it perfect for people throughout history, as far back as 1900 BC, to use it as a household item. In particular, the honeycomb bath sponge was used for things like cleaning, hygiene, cooking and agriculture in Rome.

In Greek civilization, having the Hippospongia communis was an important status symbol. They included it in their pottery and literature.

The Egyptians also used the Hippospongia communis many ways. They used the sponge to create texture on walls when painting.

Other ways that Hippospongia communis was put to use were in medicine. H. communis was used for contraception, surgery and waking people from anesthesia. H. communis was also used in cosmetics.

Due to its popularity, the sponge community was threatened due to fisheries harvesting these sponges. Fishermen overfishing these sponges were causing harmful diseases to their populations. They were fished to the point of extinction, and the waters of the Mediterranean are still feeling the repercussions.

=== Characteristics ===
Hippospongia communis is usually a large, rounded sponge that has a yellowish brown colour. The size of the bath sponge varies but the larger they are, the more expensive they can be. H.communis has a skeleton that is made out of elements such as O, I, Al, Cl, and Si. It has many oscules, making the sponge very porous. It is likely that the H. communis sponges have other organisms living within these oscules. Many organism such as crustaceans and worms are typical organisms found within the sponge. These sponges are a great habitats to sustain other kinds of life.

Hippospongia communis has a bioactive compound that makes it anti-fungal. This is due to untenospongin B, making the sponge perfect for its uses in old medicine.

== Reproduction ==
Hippospongia communis sexually reproduces year round. The sponge is also hermaphroditic, meaning it has both male and female reproductive organs at the same time.

It has been found that during its sexual reproduction, regardless of the location, Hippospongia communis eggs will fertilize at the same time. The bath sponge reproduction times are all synced throughout the different locations that the H. communis inhabit. The larva has a planktonic, free-living stage then the sponge larvae eventually settles on the sea floor, usually on rough surfaces. In many cases, the larvae does not survive these first few stages.

== Research ==
Because of the abundance and absorbency of these sponges, Hippospongia communis has been used on a variety of different studies. One study looked how the sponge was able to immobilize laccase due to ocean pollution. It is very important that the spongin in the Hippospongia communis could do this and not degrade, like other materials had.
