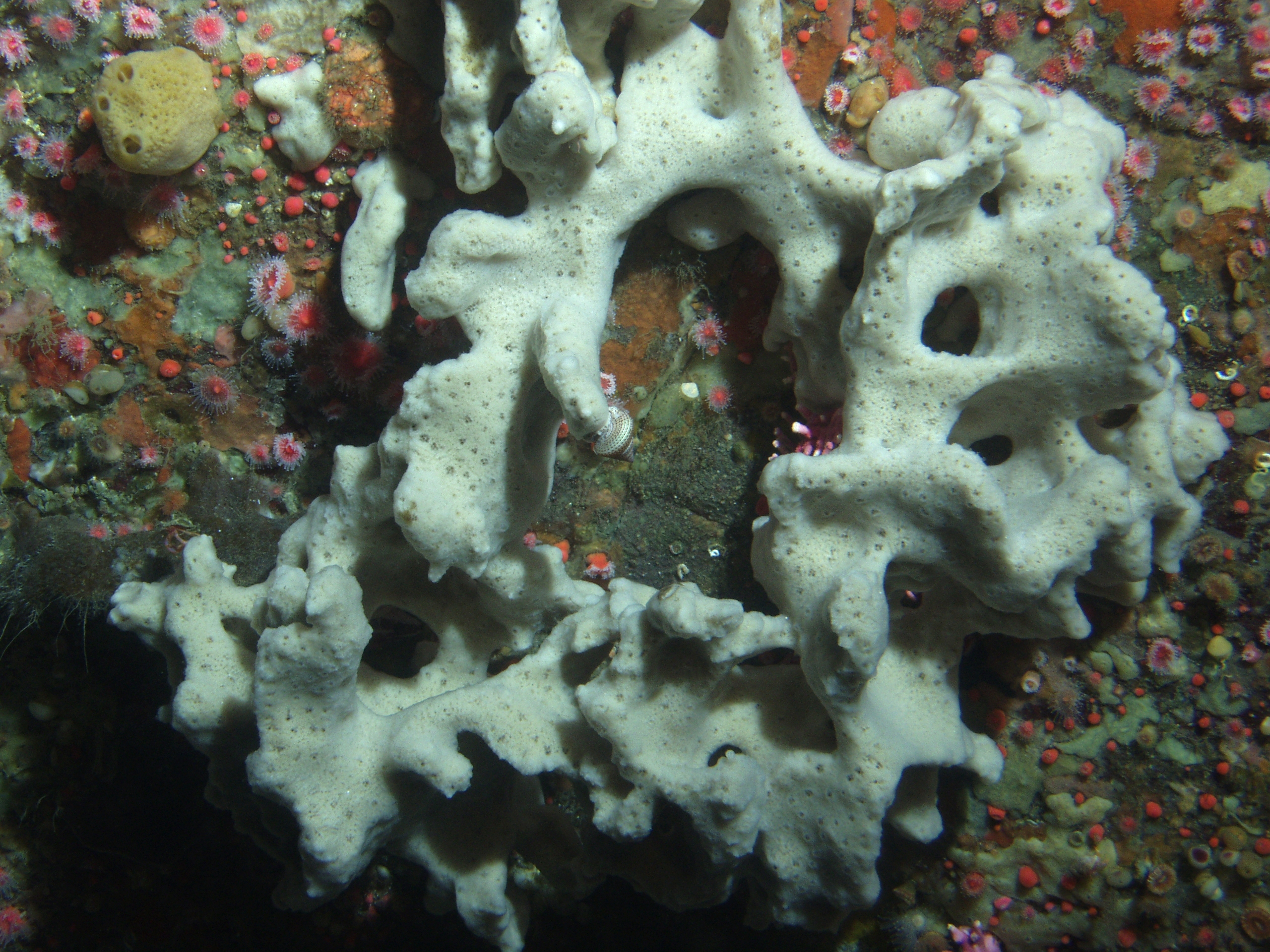
- Ircinia campana at 90 meters in California, Cordell Bank National Marine Sanctuary

Scientific classification
- Kingdom: Animalia
- Phylum: Porifera
- Class: Demospongiae
- Order: Dictyoceratida
- Family: Irciniidae
- Genus: Ircinia; Nardo, 1833

Species
- 94 species (see text)

Synonyms
- List: Dysidicinia Lendenfeld, 1889; Euricinia Lendenfeld, 1889; Filifera Lieberkühn, 1859; Filifera (Hircinia) Schmidt, 1862; Hircinella Lendenfeld, 1889; Hircinia Nardo, 1834; Hircinia (Dysidicinia) Lendenfeld, 1889; Hircinia (Euricinia) Lendenfeld, 1889; Hircinia (Hircinella) Lendenfeld, 1889; Polytherses Duchassaing & Michelotti, 1864; Stematumenia Bowerbank, 1845

= Ircinia =

Genus of sponges

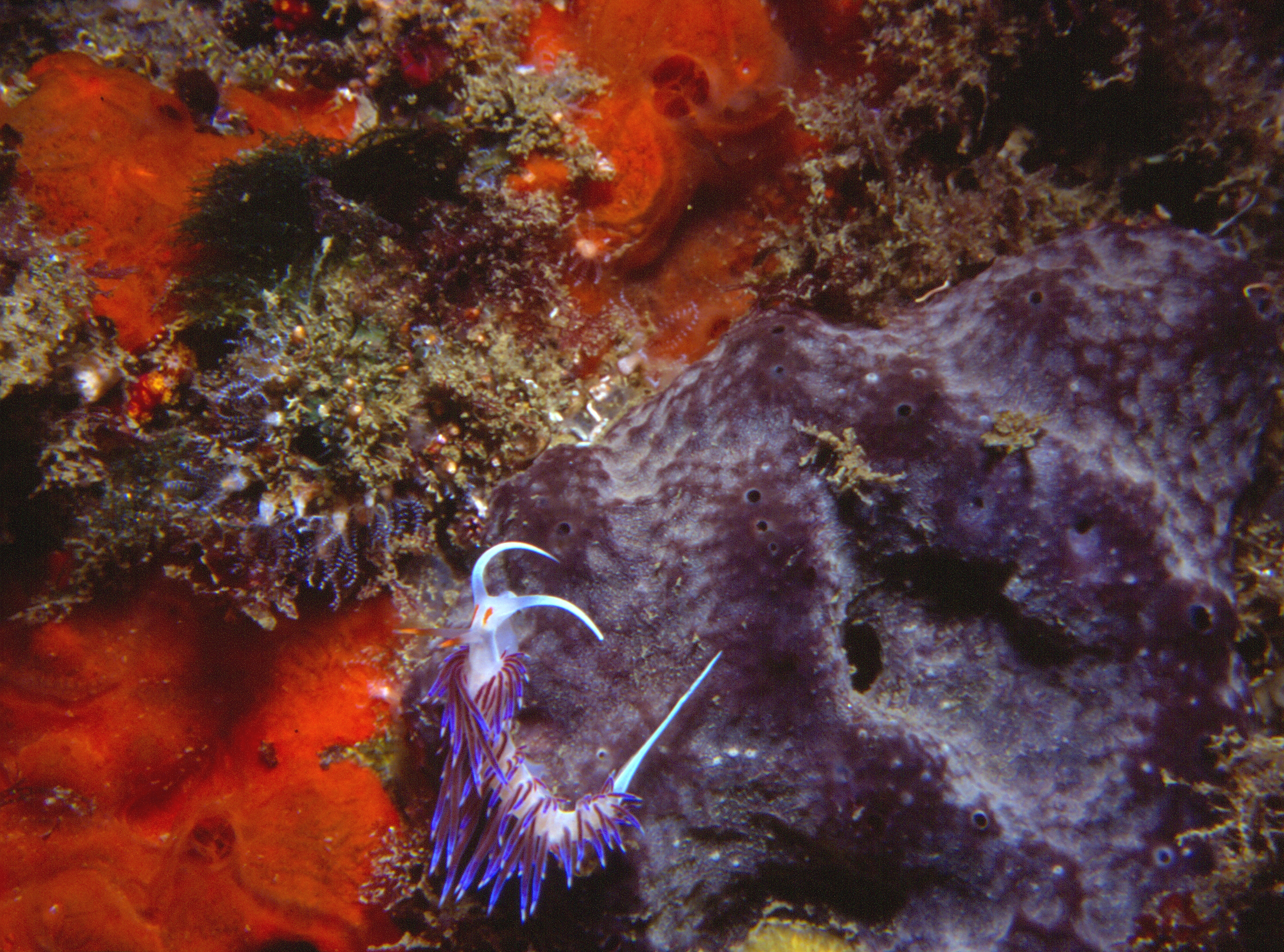
Ircinia fasciculata

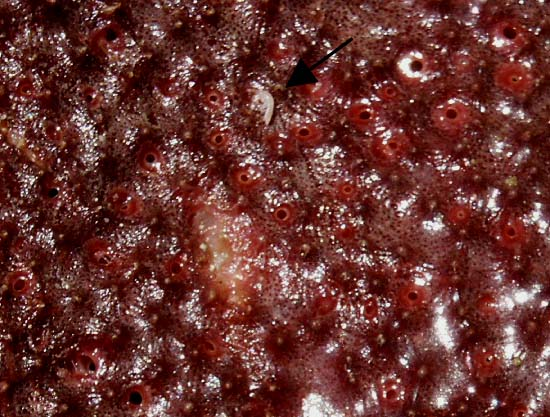
Ircinia campana

Ircinia is a genus of sea sponges in the family Irciniidae.

== Species ==
The following 94 species are recognized in the genus Ircinia:

- Ircinia akaroa Cook & Bergquist, 1999
- Ircinia arbuscula (Hyatt, 1877)
- Ircinia aruensis (Hentschel, 1912)
- Ircinia arundinacea (Carter, 1880)
- Ircinia atrovirens (Keller, 1889)
- Ircinia aucklandensis Cook & Bergquist, 1999
- Ircinia bakusi Sim, Lee & Kim, 2016
- Ircinia bergquistia Sim, Lee & Kim, 2016
- Ircinia bocatorensis Kelly & Thacker, 2021
- Ircinia cactiformis (Rao, 1941)
- Ircinia cactus (Lendenfeld, 1889)
- Ircinia caliculata (Lendenfeld, 1888)
- Ircinia campana (Lamarck, 1814)
- Ircinia canus Sim, Lee & Kim, 2017
- Ircinia carteri Van Soest & Hooper, 2020
- Ircinia chevreuxi (Topsent, 1894)
- Ircinia clavata (Thiele, 1905)
- Ircinia collectrix (Poléjaeff, 1884)
- Ircinia colossa Calcinai, Bastari, Bertolino & Pansini, 2017
- Ircinia condensa (Topsent, 1894)
- Ircinia conulosa (Ridley, 1884)
- Ircinia cuspidata (Wilson, 1902)
- Ircinia cylindracea Vacelet, Vasseur & Lévi, 1976
- Ircinia dendroides (Schmidt, 1862)
- Ircinia dickinsoni (de Laubenfels, 1936)
- Ircinia digitata (Topsent, 1894)
- Ircinia echinata (Keller, 1889)
- Ircinia ectofibrosa (George & Wilson, 1919)
- Ircinia felix (Duchassaing & Michelotti, 1864)
- Ircinia filamentosa (Lamarck, 1814)
- Ircinia fistulosa Cook & Bergquist, 1999
- Ircinia friabilis (Poléjaeff, 1884)
- Ircinia fusca (Carter, 1880)
- Ircinia gapaensis Sim, Lee & Kim, 2016
- Ircinia globulosa Sim, Lee & Kim, 2016
- Ircinia hummelincki van Soest, 1978
- Ircinia incrustans Sim, Lee & Kim, 2016
- Ircinia intertexta (Hyatt, 1877)
- Ircinia irregularis (Poléjaeff, 1884)
- Ircinia jejuensis Sim, Lee & Kim, 2016
- Ircinia lacuna Sim, Lee & Kim, 2017
- Ircinia lapillus Sim, Lee & Kim, 2016
- Ircinia lendenfeldi de Laubenfels, 1948
- Ircinia livida Samaai, Pillay & Janson, 2019
- Ircinia lowi Kelly & Thacker, 2021
- Ircinia marginalis (Duchassaing & Michelotti, 1864)
- Ircinia microconulosa Pulitzer-Finali, 1982
- Ircinia munsumensis Sim, Lee & Kim, 2016
- Ircinia mureungensis Sim, Lee & Kim, 2016
- Ircinia mutans (Wilson, 1925)
- Ircinia nolanae Goodwin & Downey, 2021
- Ircinia novaezealandiae Bergquist, 1961
- Ircinia oligoceras (Poléjaeff, 1884)
- Ircinia oros (Schmidt, 1864)
- Ircinia pauciarenaria Boury-Esnault, 1973
- Ircinia paucifilamentosa Vacelet, 1961
- Ircinia paupera (Thiele, 1905)
- Ircinia pellita (Rao, 1941)
- Ircinia pilosa Pulitzer-Finali, 1982
- Ircinia pinna (Hentschel, 1912)
- Ircinia polejaeffi Van Soest & Hooper, 2020
- Ircinia procumbens (Poléjaeff, 1884)
- Ircinia radicula Sim, Lee & Kim, 2017
- Ircinia radix Kelly & Thacker, 2021
- Ircinia ramodigitata (Burton, 1934)
- Ircinia ramosa (Keller, 1889)
- Ircinia rectilinea (Hyatt, 1877)
- Ircinia repens Sandes & Pinheiro, 2014
- Ircinia reteplana (Topsent, 1923)
- Ircinia retidermata Pulitzer-Finali & Pronzato, 1981
- Ircinia richardsoni Goodwin & Downey, 2021
- Ircinia rubra (Lendenfeld, 1889)
- Ircinia ruetzleri Kelly & Thacker, 2021
- Ircinia schulzei (Dendy, 1905)
- Ircinia selaginea (Lamarck, 1814)
- Ircinia sergipana Sandes & Pinheiro, 2014
- Ircinia simae Goodwin & Downey, 2021
- Ircinia solida (Esper, 1794)
- Ircinia spiculosa (Hentschel, 1912)
- Ircinia stipitata (Topsent, 1894)
- Ircinia strobilina (Lamarck, 1816)
- Ircinia subaspera Cook & Bergquist, 1999
- Ircinia tintinnabula (Duchassaing & Michelotti, 1864)
- Ircinia tristis (Duchassaing & Michelotti, 1864)
- Ircinia truncata (Topsent, 1894)
- Ircinia tuberosa (Dendy, 1905)
- Ircinia tunica Sim, Lee & Kim, 2017
- Ircinia turrita Cook & Bergquist, 1999
- Ircinia undulans Cook & Bergquist, 1999
- Ircinia vansoesti (Kelly & Thacker, 2021)
- Ircinia variabilis (Schmidt, 1862)
- Ircinia vestibulata (Szymanski, 1904)
- Ircinia wistarii Wilkinson, 1978
