= Coscinoderma =

Scientific classification
- Kingdom: Animalia
- Phylum: Porifera
- Class: Demospongiae
- Order: Dictyoceratida
- Family: Spongiidae
- Genus: Coscinoderma; Carter, 1883

Species
- See text

Genus of sponges

Coscinoderma is a genus of marine sponges belonging to the family Spongiidae.

== Species ==
The following species are accepted within Coscinoderma:

- Coscinoderma bakusi Sim & Kim, 2014
- Coscinoderma cavernosum Sim & Kim, 2014
- Coscinoderma confragosum Poléjaeff, 1884
- Coscinoderma denticulatum Poléjaeff, 1884
- Coscinoderma folium Sim & Kim, 2014
- Coscinoderma lacium Sim & Kim, 2014
- Coscinoderma lamarcki de Laubenfels, 1936
- Coscinoderma lanuga de Laubenfels, 1936
- Coscinoderma mappula Sim & Kim, 2014
- Coscinoderma mathewsi (Lendenfeld, 1886)
- Coscinoderma nardorus (Lendenfeld, 1886)
- Coscinoderma pesleonis (Lamarck, 1814)
- Coscinoderma pollax Sim & Kim, 2014
- Coscinoderma sporadense Voultsiadou-Koukoura, van Soest & Koukouras, 1991
- Coscinoderma truki Sim & Kim, 2014
- Coscinoderma wenoa Sim & Kim, 2014
