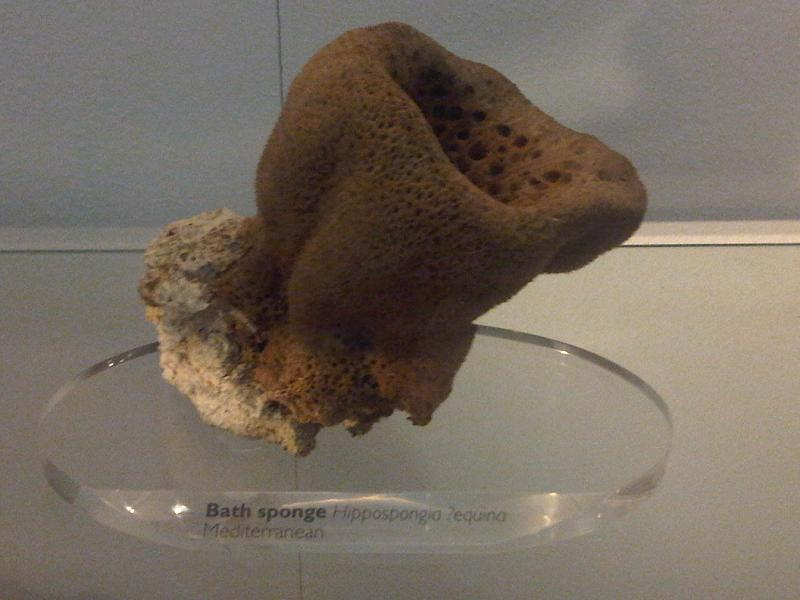
- Hippospongia equina

Scientific classification
- Kingdom: Animalia
- Phylum: Porifera
- Class: Demospongiae
- Order: Dictyoceratida
- Family: Spongiidae
- Genus: Hippospongia; Schulze, 1879

Species
- See text

= Hippospongia =

Genus of sponges

Hippospongia is a genus of sponges belonging to the family Spongiidae.

The genus has almost cosmopolitan distribution.

== Species ==
The following species are accepted within Hippospongia:

- Hippospongia ammata de Laubenfels, 1954
- Hippospongia anfractuosa (Carter, 1885)
- Hippospongia canaliculata (Lendenfeld, 1886)
- Hippospongia cerebrum Lendenfeld, 1889
- Hippospongia communis (Lamarck, 1814)
- Hippospongia cylindrica Lendenfeld, 1889
- Hippospongia densa Lendenfeld, 1889
- Hippospongia derasa Ridley, 1884
- Hippospongia elastica Lendenfeld, 1889
- Hippospongia fistulosa Lendenfeld, 1889
- Hippospongia galea (Lendenfeld, 1886)
- Hippospongia gossypina (Duchassaing & Michelotti, 1864)
- Hippospongia lachne (Laubenfels, 1936)
- Hippospongia laxa Lendenfeld, 1889
- Hippospongia massa Lendenfeld, 1889
- Hippospongia mauritiana (Hyatt, 1877)
- Hippospongia micropora (Lendenfeld, 1889)
- Hippospongia mollissima (Lendenfeld, 1889)
- Hippospongia multicia Wiedenmayer in Hooper & Wiedenmayer, 1994
- Hippospongia nigra (Lendenfeld, 1886)
- Hippospongia osculata Lendenfeld, 1889
- Hippospongia pacifica (Hyatt, 1877)
- Hippospongia seposita Wiedenmayer in Hooper & Wiedenmayer, 1994
- Hippospongia typica Lendenfeld, 1889
