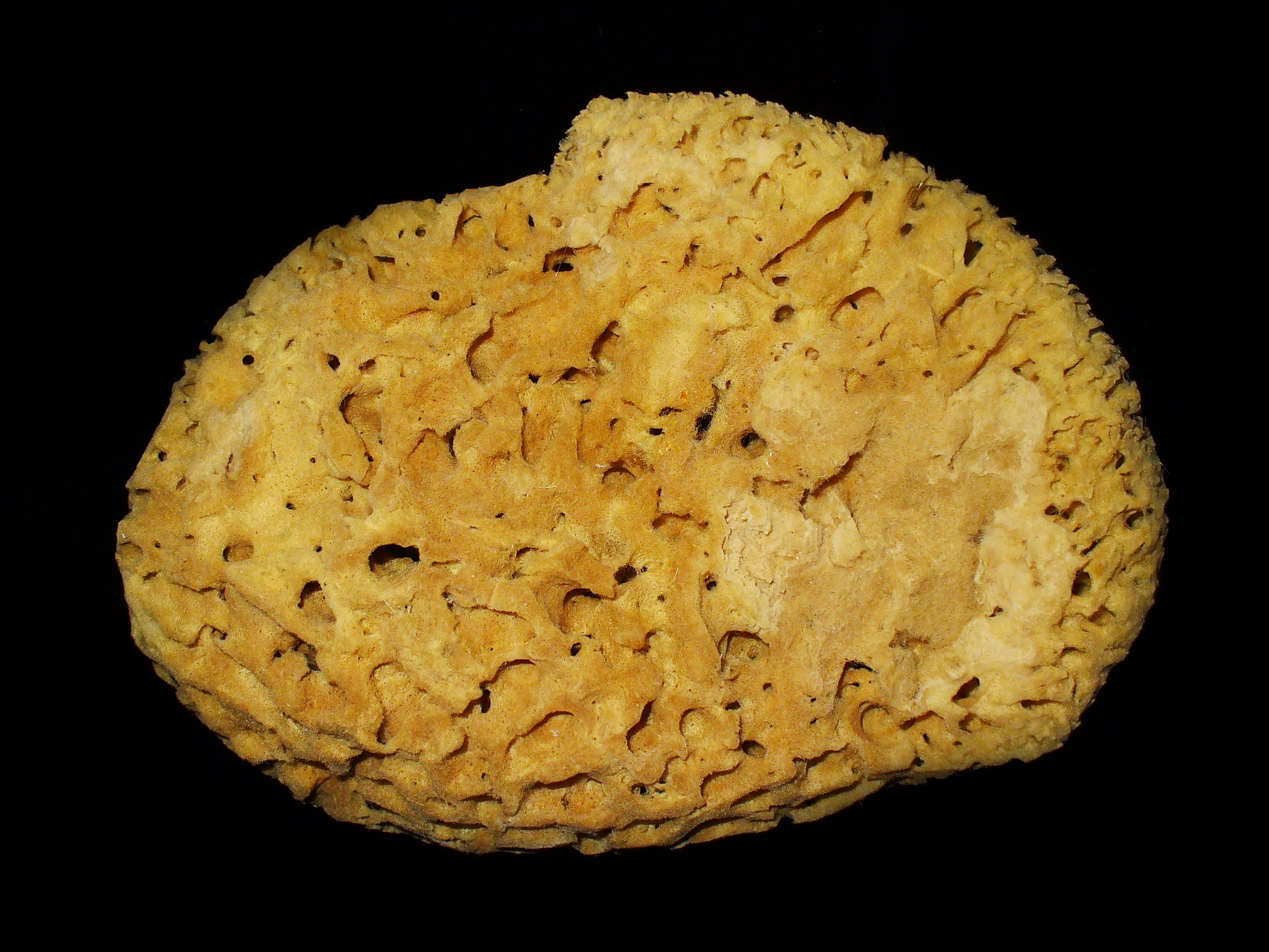
- Spongia officinalis

Scientific classification
- Domain: Eukaryota
- Kingdom: Animalia
- Phylum: Porifera
- Class: Demospongiae
- Order: Dictyoceratida
- Family: Spongiidae
- Genus: Spongia; Linnaeus, 1758

Species
- See text
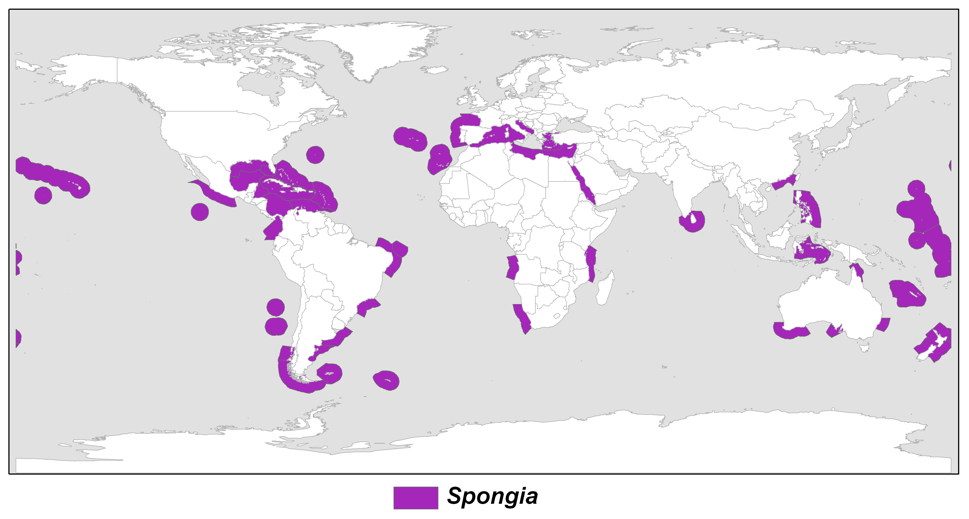
- Global distribution of Spongia species

= Spongia =

Genus of sponges

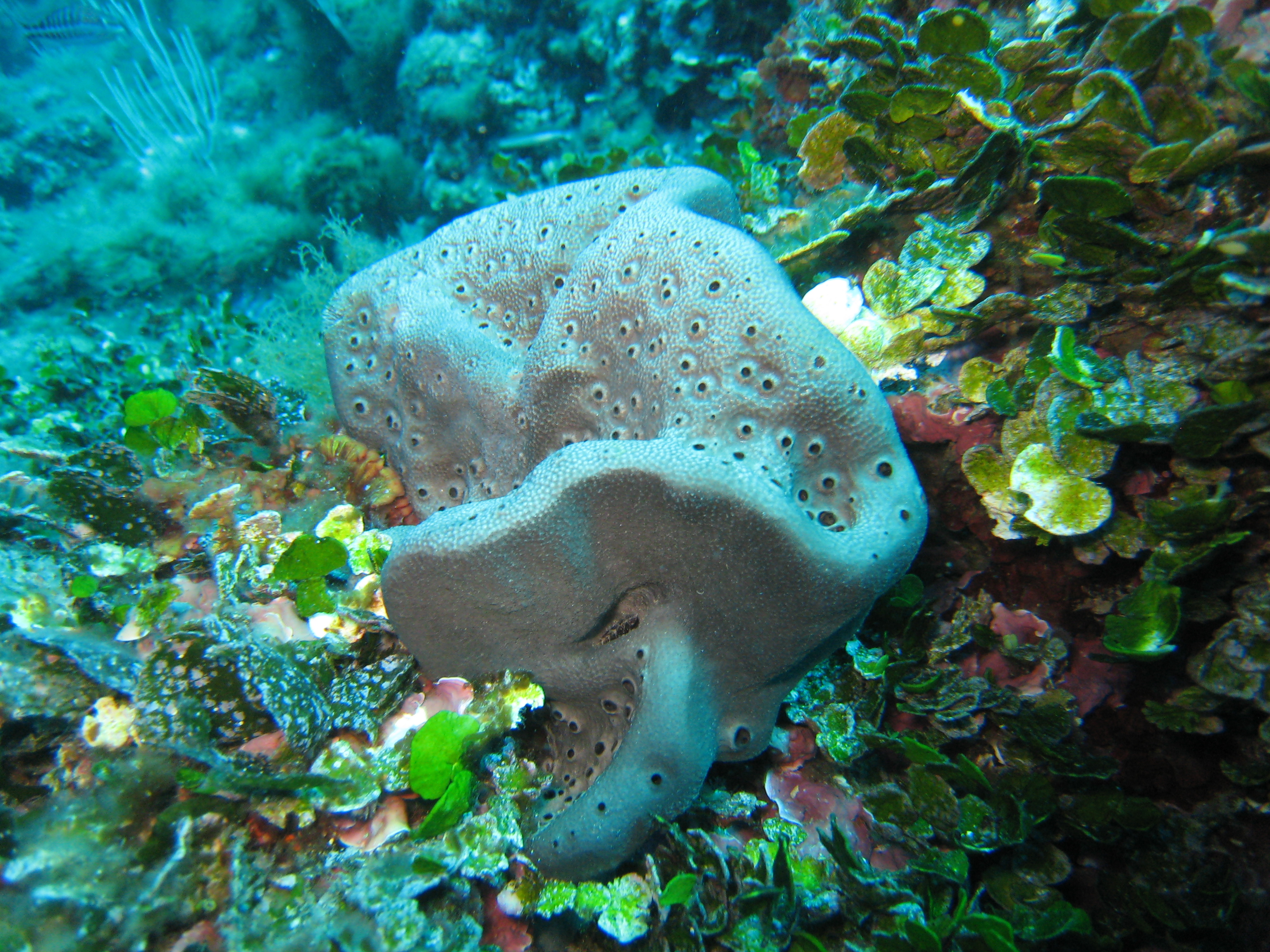
Spongia lamella in the Mediterranean Sea

Spongia is a genus of marine sponges in the family Spongiidae, originally described by Carl Linnaeus in 1759, containing more than 60 species. Some species, including Spongia officinalis, are used as cleaning tools, but have mostly been replaced in that use by synthetic or plant material.

== Classification ==
The following species are recognised in the genus Spongia:

Subgenus unassigned

- Spongia alpheushyatti Van Soest & Hooper, 2020
- Spongia alpheusi Van Soest & Hooper, 2020
- Spongia hyatti Van Soest & Hooper, 2020
- Spongia jeanbaptistei Van Soest & Hooper, 2020
- Spongia lacinulosa Lamarck, 1814
- Spongia lamarcki Van Soest & Hooper, 2020
- †Spongia mantelli Van Soest & Hooper, 2020
- Spongia muricata sensu Linnaeus, 1759
- Spongia solidahyatti Van Soest & Hooper, 2020
- Spongia stellifera Lamarck, 1814

Subgenus Australospongia Cook & Bergquist, 2001

- Spongia gracilis Cook & Bergquist, 2001

Subgenus Heterofibria Cook & Bergquist, 2001

- Spongia catarinensis Mothes, Kasper, Lerner, Campos & Carraro, 2006
- Spongia corallina Kim & Sim, 2009
- Spongia corrugata Cook & Bergquist, 2001
- Spongia decooki Van Soest & Hooper, 2020
- Spongia gorgonocephalus Cook & Bergquist, 2001
- Spongia manipulatus Cook & Bergquist, 2001
- Spongia mokohinau Cook & Bergquist, 2001
- Spongia peddemorsi Samaai, Pillay & Janson, 2020
- Spongia purpurea Kim & Sim, 2009
- Spongia smaragdus Samaai, Pillay & Janson, 2019

Subgenus Spongia

- Spongia adjimensis (Topsent, 1925)
- Spongia agaricina Pallas, 1766
- Spongia anclotea de Laubenfels & Storr, 1958
- Spongia arabica arabica Keller, 1889
- Spongia australis Bergquist, 1995
- Spongia bailyi (Lendenfeld, 1886)
- Spongia barbara Duchassaing & Michelotti, 1864
- Spongia bibulus Rao, 1941
- Spongia brunnea Lévi, 1969
- Spongia cerebralis Thiele, 1905
- Spongia ceylonensis (Dendy, 1905)
- Spongia coelosia Duchassaing & Michelotti, 1864
- Spongia conifera (Lendenfeld, 1886)
- Spongia cookii Hyatt, 1877
- Spongia distans (Schulz, 1900)
- Spongia excavata (Lendenfeld, 1889)
- Spongia fistulosa (Lendenfeld, 1889)
- Spongia fuscoides Van Soest & Hooper, 2020
- Spongia graminea Hyatt, 1877
- Spongia hispida Lamarck, 1814
- Spongia hospes (Lendenfeld, 1889)
- Spongia illawarra (Whitelegge, 1901)
- Spongia lamella (Schulze, 1879)
- Spongia lesleighae Helmy, El Serehy, Mohamed & van Soest, 2004
- Spongia lignea Hyatt, 1877
- Spongia lobosa (Poléjaeff, 1884)
- Spongia magellanica Thiele, 1905
- Spongia matamata de Laubenfels, 1954
- Spongia mexicana Hyatt, 1877
- Spongia mollicula Hyatt, 1877
- Spongia mollissima Schmidt, 1862
- Spongia nicholsoni Hyatt, 1877
- Spongia nitens (Schmidt, 1862)
- Spongia obliqua Duchassaing & Michelotti, 1864
- Spongia obscura Hyatt, 1877
- Spongia oceanica de Laubenfels, 1950
- Spongia officinalis Linnaeus, 1759
- Spongia osculata (Lendenfeld, 1889)
- Spongia osculosa (Lendenfeld, 1889)
- Spongia perforata(Lendenfeld, 1889)
- Spongia pilosa (Wilson, 1902)
- Spongia raoi Van Soest & Hooper, 2020
- Spongia reticulata (Lendenfeld, 1886)
- Spongia solitaria Hyatt, 1877
- Spongia spinosa (Lendenfeld, 1888)
- Spongia sterea de Laubenfels & Storr, 1958
- Spongia suriganensis (Wilson, 1925)
- Spongia sweeti (Kirkpatrick, 1900)
- Spongia tampa de Laubenfels & Storr, 1958
- Spongia tectoria Hyatt, 1877
- Spongia tenuiramosa (Dendy, 1905)
- Spongia tubulifera Lamarck, 1814
- Spongia violacea Lévi, 1969
- Spongia virgultosa (Schmidt, 1868)
- Spongia zimocca Schmidt, 1862
