= Leiosella =

Scientific classification
- Kingdom: Animalia
- Phylum: Porifera
- Class: Demospongiae
- Order: Dictyoceratida
- Family: Spongiidae
- Genus: Leiosella; Lendenfeld, 1888

Genus of sponges

Leiosella is a genus of sponges belonging to the family Spongiidae.

The species of this genus are found in America and Australia.

Species:

- Leiosella arbuscula (Lendenfeld, 1889)
- Leiosella caliculata Lendenfeld, 1889
- Leiosella elegans Lendenfeld, 1889
- Leiosella flabellum Lendenfeld, 1889
- Leiosella idea (de Laubenfels, 1932)
- Leiosella idia (de Laubenfels, 1932)
- Leiosella levis (Lendenfeld, 1886)
- Leiosella ramosa Bergquist, 1995
- Leiosella silicata (Lendenfeld, 1886)
