= Bergquistia =

Scientific classification
- Kingdom: Animalia
- Phylum: Porifera
- Class: Demospongiae
- Order: Dictyoceratida
- Family: Irciniidae
- Genus: Bergquistia; Sim & Lee, 2002

Type species
- Bergquistia coreana Sim & Lee, 2002

Genus of sponges

Bergquistia is a genus of sea sponges in the family Irciniidae. The genus was first described i 2002 by Korean zoologists, Chung-Ja Sim and Kyung Jin Lee, who together with Young A Kim redescribed the genus in 2017. The type species is Bergquistia coreana. The genus name honours the New Zealand sponge taxonomist, Patricia Bergquist.

== Species ==
The following species are recognized by WoRMS in the genus Bergquistia:

- Bergquistia baculus Sim, Lee & Kim, 2017
- Bergquistia coreana Sim & Lee, 2002
- Bergquistia latus Sim, Lee & Kim, 2017
- Bergquistia ramus Sim, Lee & Kim, 2017
- Bergquistia textura Sim, Lee & Kim, 2017
- Bergquistia udoensis Sim, Lee & Kim, 2017
