= Verticillitidae =

Scientific classification
- Kingdom: Animalia
- Phylum: Porifera
- Class: Demospongiae
- Order: Dictyoceratida
- Family: Verticillitidae; Steinmann, 1882

Family of sponges

Verticillitidae is a family of sponges belonging to the order Dictyoceratida.

== Genera ==
Genera:

- Cinnabaria Senowbari-Daryan, 1990
- Cryptocoelia Steinmann, 1882
- Cryptocoeliopsis Wilckens, 1937
- Vaceletia Pickett, 1982
- Verticillites Defrance, 1829
