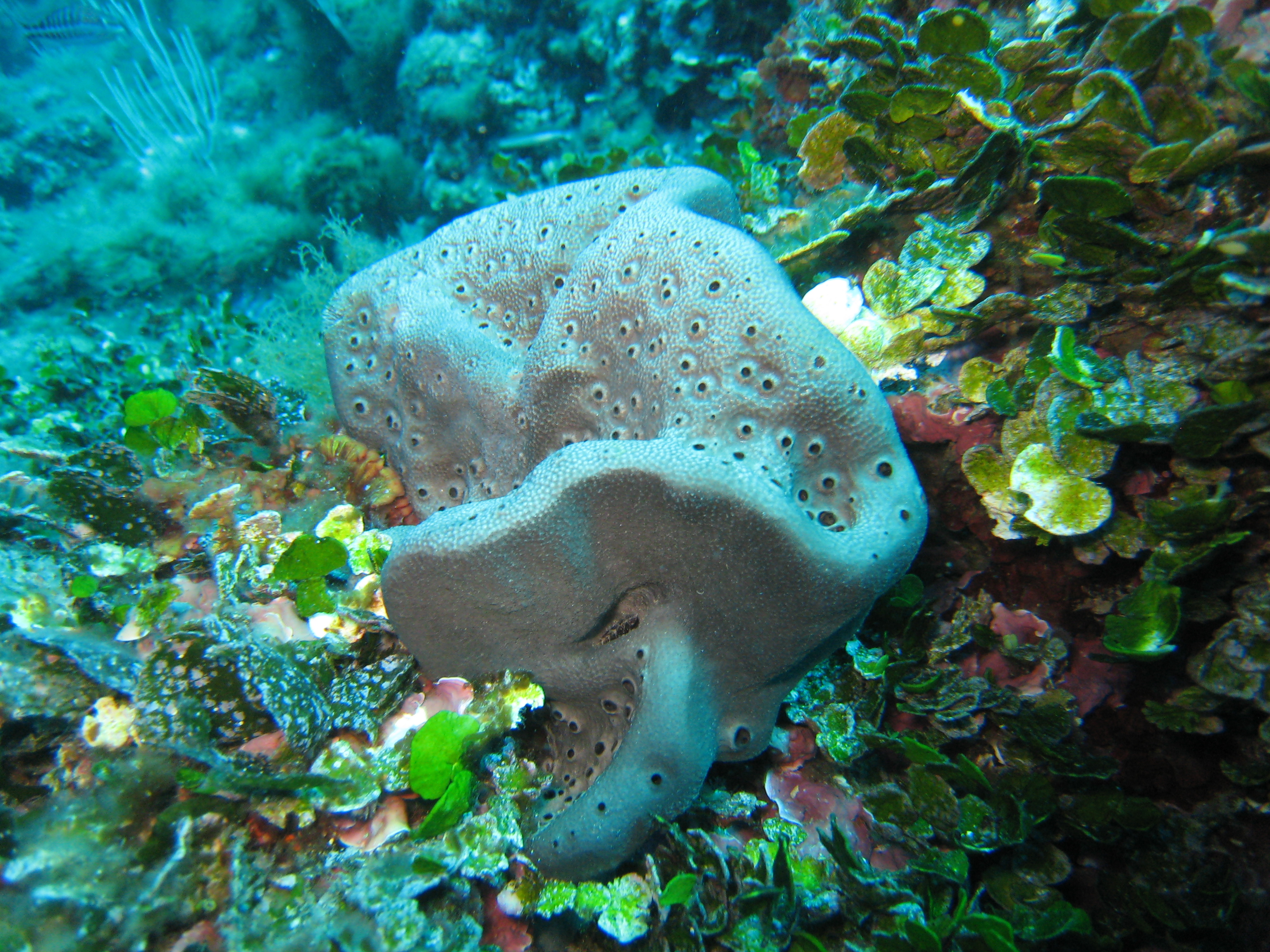
- Spongia lamella

Scientific classification
- Kingdom: Animalia
- Phylum: Porifera
- Class: Demospongiae
- Order: Dictyoceratida
- Family: Spongiidae; Gray, 1867

Genera
- See text

= Spongiidae =

Family of sea sponges

Spongiidae is a family of sea sponges in the order Dictyoceratida.

== Genera ==
- Coscinoderma Carter, 1883
- Evenor Duchassaing & Michelotti, 1864
- Hippospongia Schulze, 1879
- Hyattella Lendenfeld, 1888
- Leiosella Lendenfeld, 1888
- Rhopaloeides Thompson, Murphy, Bergquist & Evans, 1987
- Spongia Linnaeus, 1759
