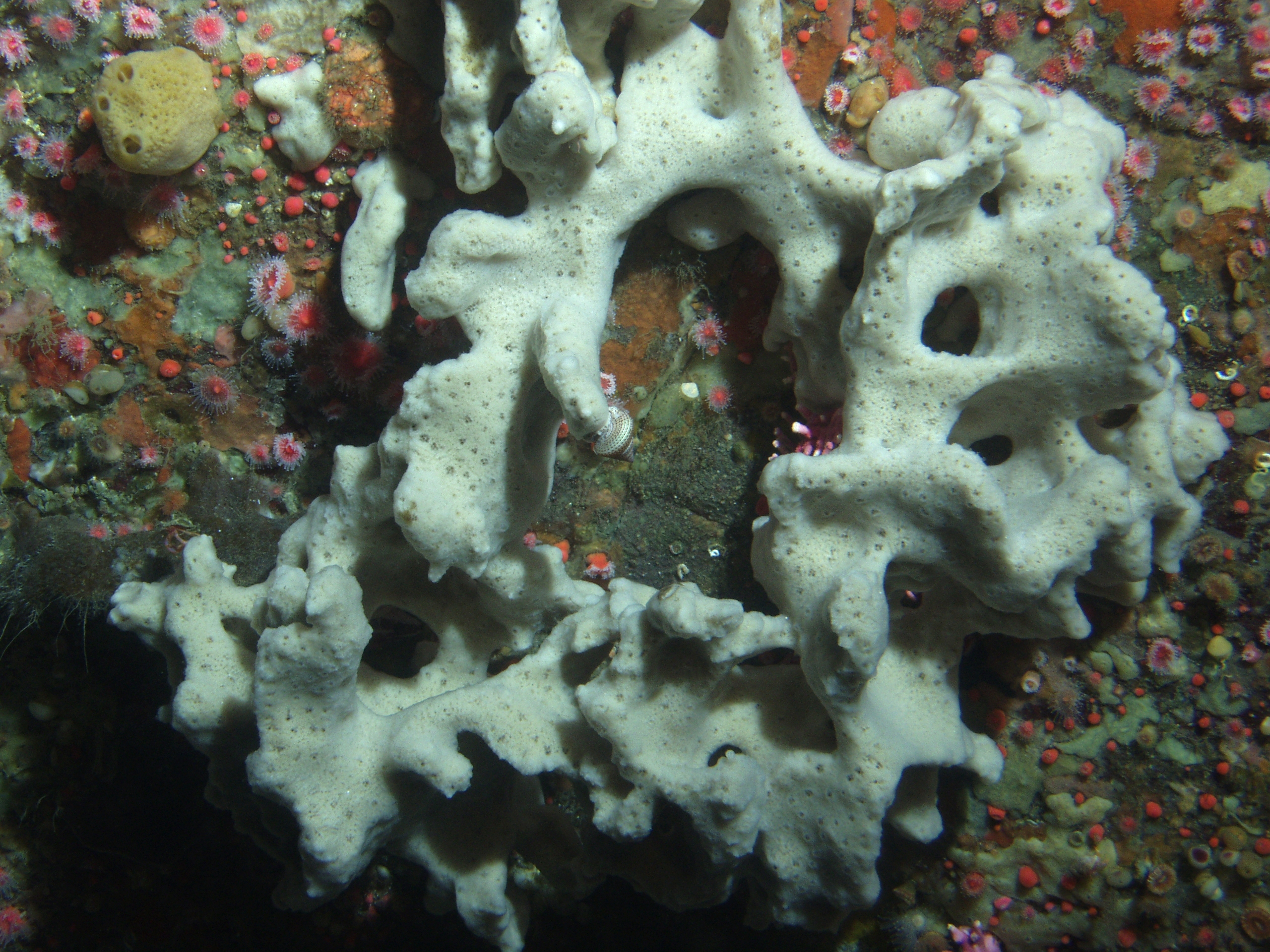
- White Sponge (Ircinia campana)

Scientific classification
- Kingdom: Animalia
- Phylum: Porifera
- Class: Demospongiae
- Order: Dictyoceratida
- Family: Irciniidae; Gray, 1867

= Irciniidae =

Family of sponges

Irciniidae is a family of sea sponges in the order Dictyoceratida.

== Genera ==
- Bergquistia Sim & Lee, 2002
- Ircinia Nardo, 1833
- Psammocinia von Lendenfeld, 1889
- Sarcotragus Schmidt, 1862
