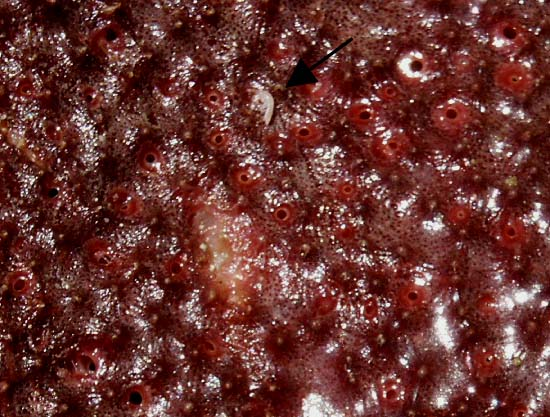
- A commensal amphipod emerges from a stinking vase sponge collected at St. Augustine Scarp.

Scientific classification
- Kingdom: Animalia
- Phylum: Porifera
- Class: Demospongiae
- Subclass: Keratosa
- Order: Dictyoceratida; Minchin, 1900

Families
- Dysideidae; Irciniidae; Spongiidae; Thorectidae; Verticillitidae

Synonyms
- Verticillitida

= Dictyoceratida =

Order of sponges

Dictyoceratida is an order of sponges in the subclass Ceractinomorpha containing five families. Along with the Dendroceratida, it is one of the two orders of demosponges that make up the keratose or "horny" sponges, in which a mineral skeleton is minimal or absent and a skeleton of organic fibers containing spongin, a collagen-like material, is present instead.
