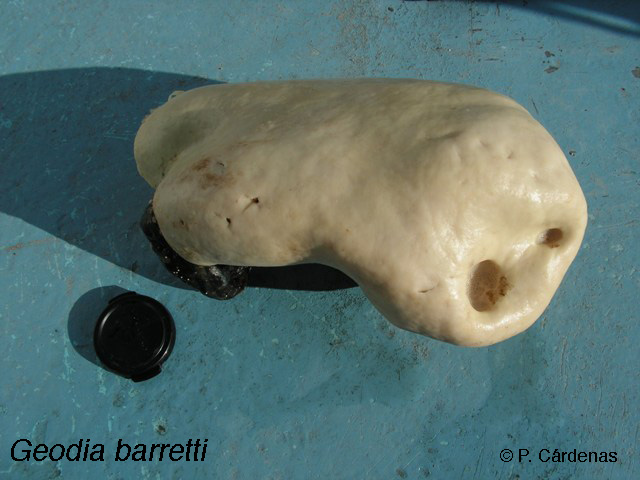

Scientific classification
- Kingdom: Animalia
- Phylum: Porifera
- Class: Demospongiae
- Order: Tetractinellida
- Family: Geodiidae
- Genus: Geodia
- Species: G. barretti

Binomial name
- Geodia barretti Bowerbank, 1858

Synonyms
- Cydonium barretti; Geodia simplicissima

= Geodia barretti =

Species of sponge

Geodia barretti is a massive deep-sea sponge species found in the boreal waters of the North Atlantic Ocean, and is fairly common on the coasts of Norway and Sweden. It is a dominant species in boreal sponge grounds. Supported by morphology and molecular data, this species is classified in the family Geodiidae.

== Morphology ==
=== External morphology ===
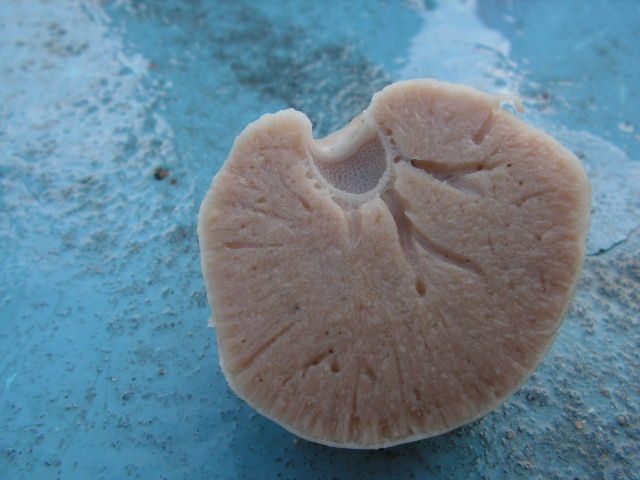
G. barretti section. The depression (= preoscule) is filled with small oscules. The cortex is conspicuous.

Massive sponge, often irregularly lobate, whitish to light yellow color. The inside is light brown. Surface is smooth. Oscules are grouped in more or less shallow depressions (= preoscules) while pores are spread over the whole body. There is a distinct cortex about 0.5 mm thick, it is made of ball-shaped spicules called sterrasters.

=== Spicules ===
==== Megascleres. ====
- Oxeas (1000-5000 μm).
- Dichotriaenes with rhabdomes up to 5000 μm long (more rarely orthotriaenes).
- Anatriaenes.
- Meso/protriaenes (rare).

==== Microscleres. ====
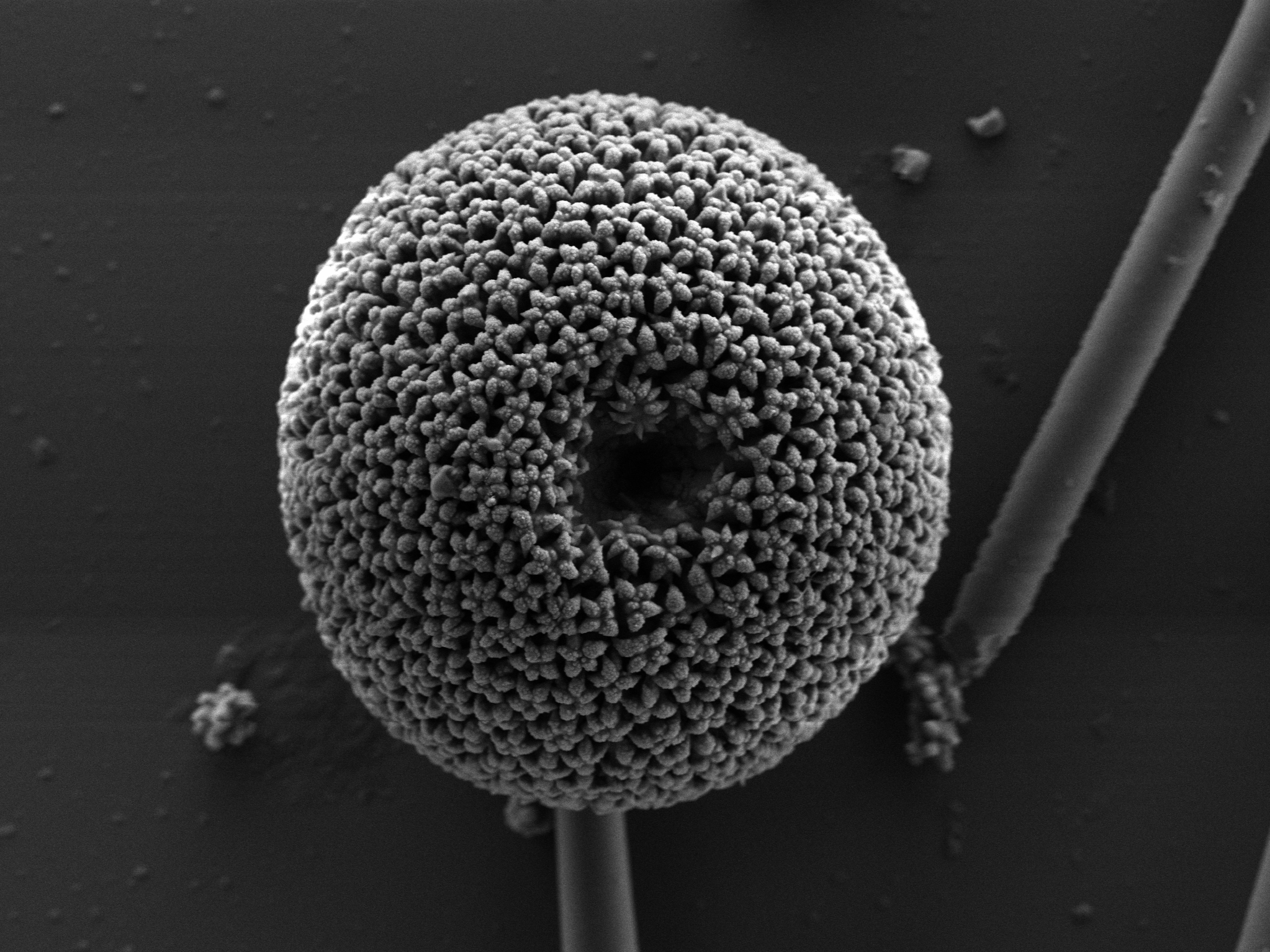
Sterraster of G. barretti (scanning electron microscope picture). Smaller strongylasters are also visible in the background.

- Microxeas (190-900 μm), sometimes slightly centrotylote.
- Sterrasters (50-130 μm).
- Oxyasters I (30-80 μm), microspined branches, only found in some specimens living > 1000 m.
- Oxyasters II (6-33 μm), microspined branches.
- Strongylasters (3-11 μm), microspined branches.

== Genetics ==
=== DNA barcodes ===
- Cytochrome oxidase subunit 1 gene (mitochondrial). Folmer fragment: 2 haplotypes with 1 base pair difference. One haplotype (EU442194) is present throughout the North Atlantic. The second haplotype (KC574389) has so far only been found in Flemish Cap populations.
- 28S rDNA (nuclear). C1-D2 domains. Genbank numbers HM592809, EU552080.
- 18S rDNA (nuclear). Genbank number KC481224

=== Genomics ===
One meta-transcriptome was obtained by pyrosequencing from a specimen collected south of Bergen (Norway) in 2007. Double-stranded cDNA was sequenced on a GF FLX sequencer (Roche Applied Sciences/454 Life Sciences, Barnford, CT). rRNA ribo-tags revealed a microsymbiont community, dominated by group SAR202 of Chloroflexota, candidate phylum "Poribacteria", and Acidobacteriota. The most abundant mRNAs coded for key metabolic enzymes of nitrification from ammonia-oxidizing Archaea as well as candidate genes involved in related processes.

The whole genome of this sponge was first published in 2023; it was sequenced on PacBio and Illumina (HiSeqX) platforms from a specimen collected in 2016 in Kosterhavet National Park, on the Swedish west coast. This nuclear genome assembly is 144 Mbp long (4,535 scaffolds) with a BUSCO completeness of 71.5%, while the mitochondrial genome is 17,996 bp long. Annotation of the nuclear genome found 31,884 protein-coding genes.

== Systematics ==
=== Etymology ===
This sponge was named in honor of one of its discoverers, the biologist Lucas Barrett (1837-1862).

=== Vernacular names ===
This sponge is called "rutabaga sponge" in Norwegian (kålrabisvamp) and "football sponge" in Swedish (fotbollssvampdjur).

=== Type material ===
This sponge was collected by biologists Robert McAndrew and Lucas Barrett in 1855 on the South side of Vikna Island (formerly called Vigten or Vikten Island), North-Trøndelag, Norway, at a depth of 183 meters. It was later described by the British sponge taxonomist James Scott Bowerbank in 1858.

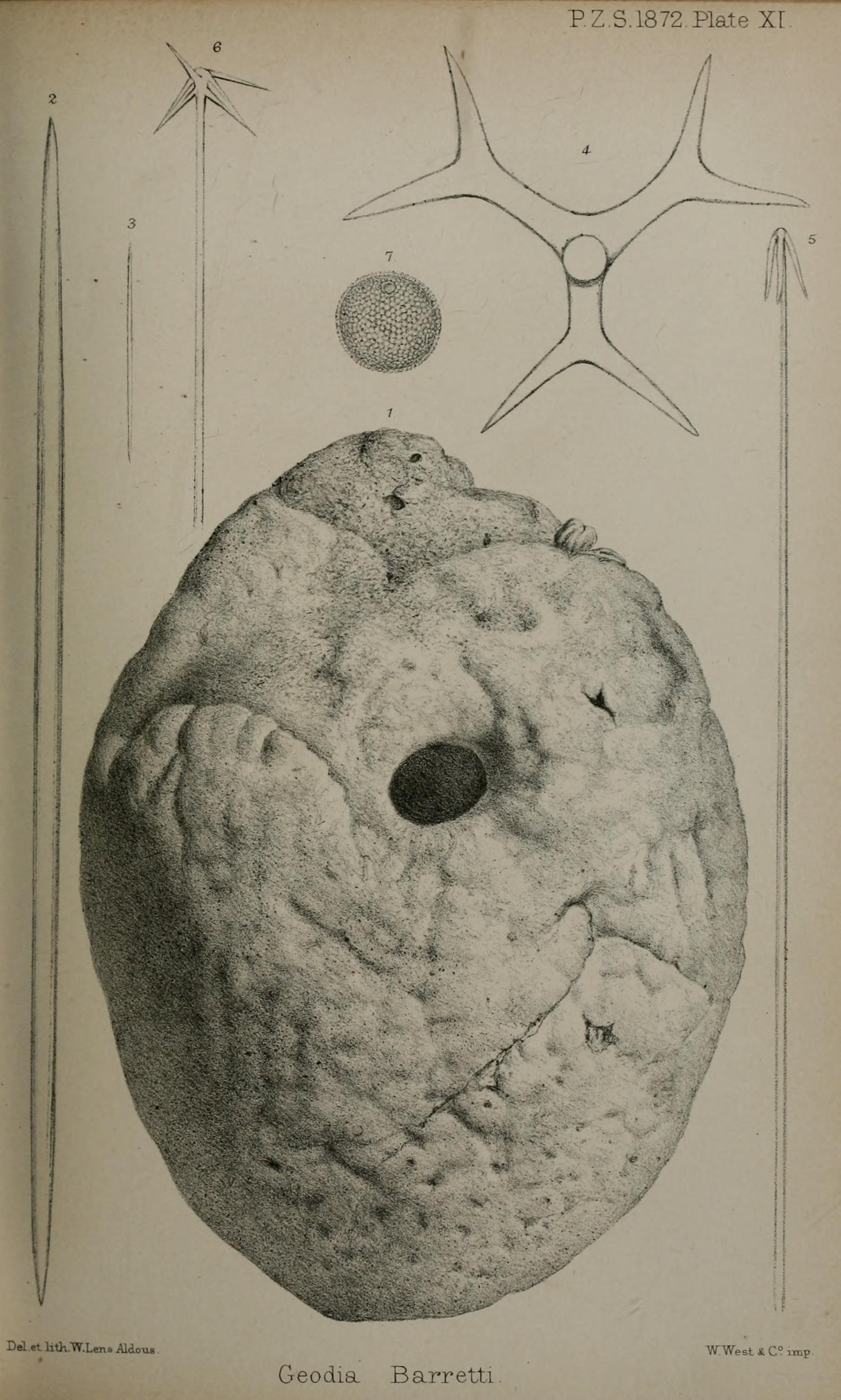
Drawing of the holotype of G. barretti (Bowerbank, 1872a: plate XI).

The holotype is a dry specimen stored at the Natural History Museum in London with the museum number BNHM 1877.5.21.1399. There are also slides of the holotype: BNHM 1877.5.21.1400 (one slide of surface and one spicule preparation) and BNHM 1877.5.21.1401 (slide of a section).

=== Phylogenetic relationships ===
According to morphology and molecular data, this species belongs to the family Geodiidae and to the genus Geodia. It also seems to belong to a clade of Geodia species that all have their oscules in depressions (including Geodia megastrella, Geodia hentscheli). This Geodia clade was given a PhyloCode name: Depressiogeodia.

== Distribution ==
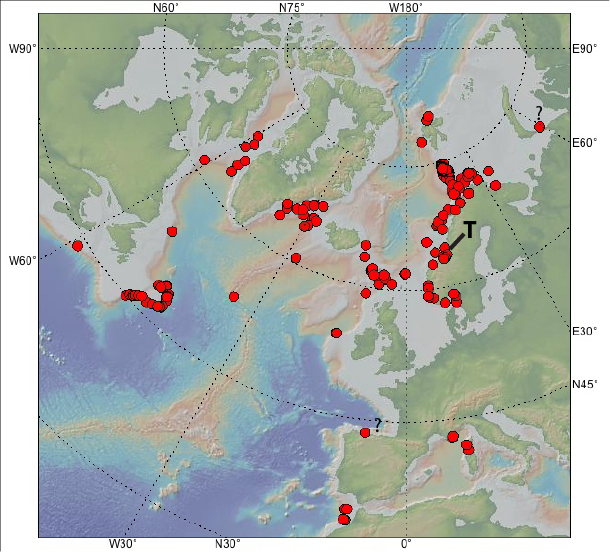
G. barretti known distribution in the North Atlantic (as of 2015).

=== Biogeography ===
G. barretti is present throughout the boreal waters of the North Atlantic, where water temperature is usually 3-9 degrees Celsius. This species is present on the Swedish west coast and all along the Norwegian coast and Svalbard.

One single specimen was formally recorded from the Mediterranean Sea, in the 'Canyon des Moines' (south Corsica), at 167 m (water temperature was 13 °C). Deeper specimens (1100-1700 meter depths) were also recorded off the Atlantic coast of Morocco (Ibero-Moroccan Gulf). Several deep specimens were collected on the mid-Atlantic ridge at 1650 m depth.

=== Bathymetry ===
It is found from 30 to 2000 meter depths. Most North-East Atlantic records are from the continental margins, between 200 and 500 m. In the North-West Atlantic (Grand Banks, Flemish Cap, Nova Scotia, and Davis Strait), it has been recorded between 410 and 1852 meter depths. Shallow specimens are common along the Norwegian coast, especially in fjords.

== Biology ==
=== Reproduction ===
G. barretti is an oviparous species with separated males and females. The reproductive cycle is annual with one or two events of gamete release per year, the major reproductive season being from late spring to early autumn. The larvae has never been observed. Asexual reproduction has never been formally described.

The reproduction molecular toolkit of boreo-arctic Geodia species has been investigated, including in Geodia barretti, using proteomic and trancriptomic data. Genes involved in the formation of the gametes appeared close to the ones found in the rest of the animals.

=== Predators ===
The sponge-feeding deep-sea chiton Hanleya nagelfar is often found on G. barretti in the North-East Atlantic. The parasitic foraminiferan Hyrrokkin sarcophaga is more rarely found living on G. barretti.

=== Associated macrofauna ===
G. barretti has less associated macrofauna than any of the other boreo-arctic Geodia species: only ten different species of epibionts were recorded vs. 62 for Geodia macandrewii.

== Microbiology ==
G. barretti is a high microbial abundance (HMA) sponge, such that the mesohyl is essentially packed with microbes, and just a few sponge cells. It was calculated that the sponge itself (canals, choanocyte chambers and cells) represents only 5% of its total volume, the rest being microbes.

Estimates of the number of bacteria in G. barretti are between 2.9 × 10^{11} and 3.1 × 10^{11} microbes/cm^{3} sponge.

=== Isolation and study of specific bacteria ===
Streptomyces sp. GBA 94-10, an Actinomycetota, was isolated from a Norwegian G. barretti. It was shown to be a close relative of the terrestrial Streptomyces albus J1074. The genome was fully sequenced (Genbank accession numbers CM002271- plasmid pGBA1 CM002272).

Streptomyces poriferorum (type strain P01-B04^{T}), an Actinomycetota, was isolated and described in two Norwegian sponges (Antho dichotoma and G. barretti). This bacteria might provide their host with chemical defenses and might be involved in nitrogen metabolism. The whole genome was sequenced (Genbank accession number JAELVH010000000); the 16S rRNA gene sequence can also be found on Genbank (MW583039).

Actinoalloteichus fjordicus, an Actinomycetota, was isolated and described in two Norwegian sponges (Antho dichotoma and G. barretti). This Actinomycetota genus has been found in terrestrial and marine habitats. This bacterium's genome was fully sequenced (Genbank accession numbers CP016077-plasmid CP016078).

== Chemistry ==
The major compound of G. barretti, called barettin, was isolated in 1986 at Uppsala University, Sweden; barettin has antifouling activity. Since then, two more barettins were discovered, as well as other small molecules (see Table below). Peptides called barrettides were found and published in 2015. Using metabolomics on specimens of G. barretti from Sweden, most of these compounds could be found, in addition to nucleotides, nucleosides and nucleobases, as well as some fatty acids.

Compounds isolated from Geodia barretti
Compound	Type of compound	Discovered/described by	Biactivities	Structure
barettin	diketopiperazine (monobrominated)	Lidgren, Bohlin and Bergman (1986)	antifouling; selective 5-HT ligands; antioxidant; anti-inflammatory; Inhibitor of electric eel acetylcholinesterase; NOT antitumoral	m/z 419,0826 [M+H]^{+}
8,9-dihydrobarettin	diketopiperazine (monobrominated)	Sjögren, Göransson, Johnson, Dahlström, Andersson, Bergman, Jonsson and Bohlin (2004)	antifouling; selective 5-HT ligands; inhibitor of electric eel acetylcholinesterase	m/z 421,0982 [M+H]^{+}
bromobenzisoxalone barettin	diketopiperazine (dibrominated)	Hedner, Sjögren, Fröndberg, Johansson, Göransson, Dahlström, Jonsson, Nyberg and Bohlin (2006)	antifouling	m/z 648,0200 [M+H]^{+}
geobarettin A	diketopiperazine (monobrominated)	Di, Rouger, Hardardottir, Freysdottir, Molinski, Tasdemir and Omarsdottir (2018)	NO anti-inflammatory activity	m/z 451.0728 [M+H]^{+}
geobarettin B	diketopiperazine (monobrominated)	Di, Rouger, Hardardottir, Freysdottir, Molinski, Tasdemir and Omarsdottir (2018)	anti-inflammatory activity	m/z 417.0675 [M+H]^{+}
geobarettin C	indole (monobrominated)	Di, Rouger, Hardardottir, Freysdottir, Molinski, Tasdemir and Omarsdottir (2018)	anti-inflammatory activity	m/z 295.0440 [M]^{+}
L-6-bromohypaphorine	indole (monobrominated)	Di, Rouger, Hardardottir, Freysdottir, Molinski, Tasdemir and Omarsdottir (2018)	Agonist of Human α7 Nicotinic Acetylcholine Receptor	m/z 325.0550 [M+H]^{+}
6-bromoconicamin	indole (monobrominated)	Olsen, Hansen, Moodie, Isaksson, Sepcic, Cergolj, Svenson and Andersen (2016)	inhibitor of electric eel acetylcholinesterase	m/z 279.0491 [M]^{+}
8-hydroxy-6-bromoconicamin	indole (monobrominated)	Olsen, Hansen, Moodie, Isaksson, Sepcic, Cergolj, Svenson and Andersen (2016)	NO inhibition of electric eel acetylcholinesterase	m/z 297.0586 [M]^{+}
3-methylcytidine, 3-methyl-2'-deoxycytidine, 3-methyl-2'-deoxyuridine	nucleoside	Lidgren, Bohlin, and Christophersen (1988)	contractile activity (3-mCyd, 3-mdCyd)	
histamine	histidine derivative	Lidgren, Bohlin, and Christophersen (1988)	contractile activity	m/z 112.0869 [M+H]^{+}
barrettides A-B	peptides	Carstens, Rosengren, Gunasekera, Schempp, Bohlin, Dahlström, Clark and Göransson (2015)	antifouling NOT antibacterial	
2-O-acetyl-1-O-hexadecylglycero-3-phosphocholine	phosphocholine	Olsen, Søderholm, Isaksson, Andersen and Hansen (2016)	antitumoral	
glycine betain β-alanine betain ɣ-aminobutyric acid betain tetramethylammonium ion	quaternary ammonium compounds	Hougaard, Anthoni, Christophersen, Larsen and Nielsen (1991) Erngren, Smit, Pettersson, Cárdenas, Hedeland (2021)		
sterols		Hougaard, Christophersen, Nielsen, Klitgaard, and Tendal (1991)		
fatty acids		Thiel, Blumenberg, Hefter, Pape, Pomponi, Reed, Reitner, Wörheide and Michaelis (2002) de Kluijver, Nierop, Morganti, Bart, Slaby, Hanz, de Goeij, Mienis, Middelburg (2021)		
free amino acids		Hougaard, Christophersen, Nielsen, Klitgaard, and Tendal (1991)		
