= Geodia bicolor =

Scientific classification
- Kingdom: Animalia
- Phylum: Porifera
- Class: Demospongiae
- Order: Tetractinellida
- Family: Geodiidae
- Genus: Geodia
- Species: G. bicolor

Binomial name
- Geodia bicolor Lendenfeld, 1910

Synonyms
- Sidonops bicolor

Species of sponge

Geodia bicolor is a species of sponge in the family Geodiidae. It is found in the waters of the Pacific Ocean off the coast of California.

== Bibliography ==
- Lendenfeld, R. Von 1910a. The Sponges. 1. The Geodidae. In: Reports on the Scientific Results of the Expedition to the Eastern Tropical Pacific, in charge of Alexander Agassiz, by the U.S. Fish Commission Steamer ‘Albatross’, from October, 1904, to March, 1905, Lieut. Commander L.M. Garrett, U.S.N., Commanding, and of other Expeditions of the Albatross, 1888-1904. (21). Memoirs of the Museum of Comparative Zoology at Harvard College 41 (1): 1-259, pls 1-48.
