= Penares sphaera =

Scientific classification
- Kingdom: Animalia
- Phylum: Porifera
- Class: Demospongiae
- Order: Tetractinellida
- Family: Geodiidae
- Genus: Penares
- Species: P. sphaera

Binomial name
- Penares sphaera (Lendenfeld, 1907)

Synonyms
- Papyrula sphaera Lendenfeld, 1907

Species of sponge

Penares sphaera, the crater sponge, is a deep sea demosponge from southern Africa.

== Description ==
This pale sponge has a thick encrusting growth form. It ranges from white to pale peach to light grey. It is very hard, almost stony. It does, however, tear easily. The surface looks smooth but has a rough texture. White ringed ostioles are scattered across the surface and may be more clustered in some parts. Oscules are abundant on the upper parts. It may grow to be 110 mm (4.3 in) long and 90 mm (3.5 in) wide.

=== Spicules ===
The following spicules make up the skeleton of this species:

- Dichotriaenes (spicules that branch in pairs) with short rays
- Curved robust oxeas (spicules with pointed ends)
- Curved microxeas (small oxeas)

=== Skeleton ===
Dichotriaenes and envelop the surface. The longest rays face inwards. Oxeas and microxeas are scattered in the choanosome. The cortex is made of densely packed microxeas.

== Distribution and habitat ==
This species is found off the coast of Namibia and off the West, South and East Coasts of South Africa. It grows on solid surfaces at depths of 107–500 m (351–1,640 ft).

== Ecology ==
This species is sometimes found growing on other sponges. Molluscs may be found living within the sponge and invertebrates may be found living on the surface.
