= Geodia agassizi =

Scientific classification
- Kingdom: Animalia
- Phylum: Porifera
- Class: Demospongiae
- Order: Tetractinellida
- Family: Geodiidae
- Genus: Geodia
- Species: G. agassizi

Binomial name
- Geodia agassizi Lendenfeld, 1910

Species of sponge

Geodia agassizi is a species of sponge in the family Geodiidae. The species is found in the eastern tropical Pacific Ocean and was first described by Robert Lendenfeld in 1910.

== Bibliography ==
- Lendenfeld, R. Von 1910a. The Sponges. 1. The Geodidae. In: Reports on the Scientific Results of the Expedition to the Eastern Tropical Pacific, in charge of Alexander Agassiz, by the U.S. Fish Commission Steamer ‘Albatross’, from October, 1904, to March, 1905, Lieut. Commander L.M. Garrett, U.S.N., Commanding, and of other Expeditions of the Albatross, 1888-1904. (21). Memoirs of the Museum of Comparative Zoology at Harvard College 41 (1): 1-259, pls 1-48.
