= Geodia carcinophila =

Scientific classification
- Kingdom: Animalia
- Phylum: Porifera
- Class: Demospongiae
- Order: Tetractinellida
- Family: Geodiidae
- Genus: Geodia
- Species: G. carcinophila

Binomial name
- Geodia carcinophila Lendenfeld, 1897

Synonyms
- Isops carcinophila

Species of sponge

Geodia carcinophila is a species of sponge in the family Geodiidae. It was first described by Lendenfeld in 1897. It is found in the waters of the Somali Sea around the Zanzibar Archipelago.

== Bibliography ==
- Lendenfeld, R. Von (1897) Spongien von Sansibar., Abhandlungen herausgegeben von der Senckenbergischen naturforschenden Gesellschaft 21: 93-133, pls 9-10.
