= Geodia ataxastra =

Scientific classification
- Kingdom: Animalia
- Phylum: Porifera
- Class: Demospongiae
- Order: Tetractinellida
- Family: Geodiidae
- Genus: Geodia
- Species: G. ataxastra

Binomial name
- Geodia ataxastra Lendenfeld, 1910

Species of sponge

Geodia ataxastra is a species of sponge in the family Geodiidae. It is found in the waters of the Pacific Ocean near the coasts of Panama and Colombia. The species was first described by Robert J. Lendlmayer von Lendenfeld in 1910.

== Bibliography ==
- Lendenfeld, R. Von 1910a. The Sponges. 1. The Geodidae. In: Reports on the Scientific Results of the Expedition to the Eastern Tropical Pacific, in charge of Alexander Agassiz, by the U.S. Fish Commission Steamer ‘Albatross’, from October, 1904, to March, 1905, Lieut. Commander L.M. Garrett, U.S.N., Commanding, and of other Expeditions of the Albatross, 1888-1904. (21). Memoirs of the Museum of Comparative Zoology at Harvard College 41 (1): 1-259, pls 1-48.
