= Geodia areolata =

Scientific classification
- Domain: Eukaryota
- Kingdom: Animalia
- Phylum: Porifera
- Class: Demospongiae
- Order: Tetractinellida
- Family: Geodiidae
- Genus: Geodia
- Species: G. areolata

Binomial name
- Geodia areolata Carter, 1880

Species of sponge

Geodia areolata is a species of sponge in the family Geodiidae. It is found in the waters of the Gulf of Mannar, between the southeastern tip of India and the west coast of Sri Lanka. The species was first described by Henry John Carter in 1880.

== Bibliography ==
- Carter, H.J. (1869). Report on Specimens dredged up from the Gulf of Manaar and presented to the Liverpool Free Museum by Capt.W.H. Cawne Warren. Annals and Magazine of Natural History. (5) 6(31):35-61, pls IV-VI; 129–156, pls VII, VIII. page(s): p. 133, pl. VI. figs. 36, a-g and 37.
