= Geodia gallica =

Scientific classification
- Kingdom: Animalia
- Phylum: Porifera
- Class: Demospongiae
- Order: Tetractinellida
- Family: Geodiidae
- Genus: Geodia
- Species: G. gallica

Binomial name
- Geodia gallica Lendenfeld, 1907

Synonyms
- Isops gallica

Species of sponge

Geodia gallica is a species of sponge in the family Geodiidae. The species was first described by Lendenfeld in 1907. It is found in the coastal waters of Agulhas Bank, next to South Africa.

== Bibliography ==
- Lendenfeld, R. von. (1907). « Die Tetraxonia. Wissenschaftliche Ergebnisse der Deutschen Tiefsee-Expedition auf der Dampfer Valdivia 1898-1899 ». 11(1-2): i-iv, 59-374, pls IX-XLVI.
