= Geodia erinacea =

Scientific classification
- Kingdom: Animalia
- Phylum: Porifera
- Class: Demospongiae
- Order: Tetractinellida
- Family: Geodiidae
- Genus: Geodia
- Species: G. erinacea

Binomial name
- Geodia erinacea Lendenfeld, 1888

Synonyms
- Cydonium erinaceum

Species of sponge

Geodia erinacea is a species of sponge in the family Geodiidae. The species was first described by Lendenfeld in 1888. It is found in all the coastal waters of Australia.

== Bibliography ==
- Lendenfeld, R. von. (1888). Descriptive Catalogue of the Sponges in the Australian Museum, Sidney. (Taylor & Francis: London). i-xiv, 1-260, pls 1-12.
