= Geodia conchilega =

Scientific classification
- Kingdom: Animalia
- Phylum: Porifera
- Class: Demospongiae
- Order: Tetractinellida
- Family: Geodiidae
- Genus: Geodia
- Species: G. conchilega

Binomial name
- Geodia conchilega Schmidt, 1862

Synonyms
- Cydonium conchilegum Schmidt, 1862; Pachymatisma intermedia (Schmidt, 1868); Stelletta intermedia (Schmidt, 1868)

Species of sponge

Geodia conchilega is a species of sea sponge in the family Geodiidae.

It is found in the Adriatic Sea.

== Bibliography ==
- Schmidt, O. (1862). Die Spongien des adriatischen Meeres. (Wilhelm Engelmann: Leipzig): i-viii, 1-88, pls 1-7. page(s): 51; pl IV fig 11
