= Geodia anceps =

Scientific classification
- Domain: Eukaryota
- Kingdom: Animalia
- Phylum: Porifera
- Class: Demospongiae
- Order: Tetractinellida
- Family: Geodiidae
- Genus: Geodia
- Species: G. anceps

Binomial name
- Geodia anceps (Vosmaer, 1894)

Synonyms
- Isops anceps (Vosmaer, 1894); Synops anceps (Vosmaer, 1894)

Species of sponge

Geodia anceps is a species of sponge in the family Geodiidae. The species is found in the western part of the Mediterranean Sea and was first described by Gualtherus Carel Jacob Vosmaer in 1894 as Synops anceps.
