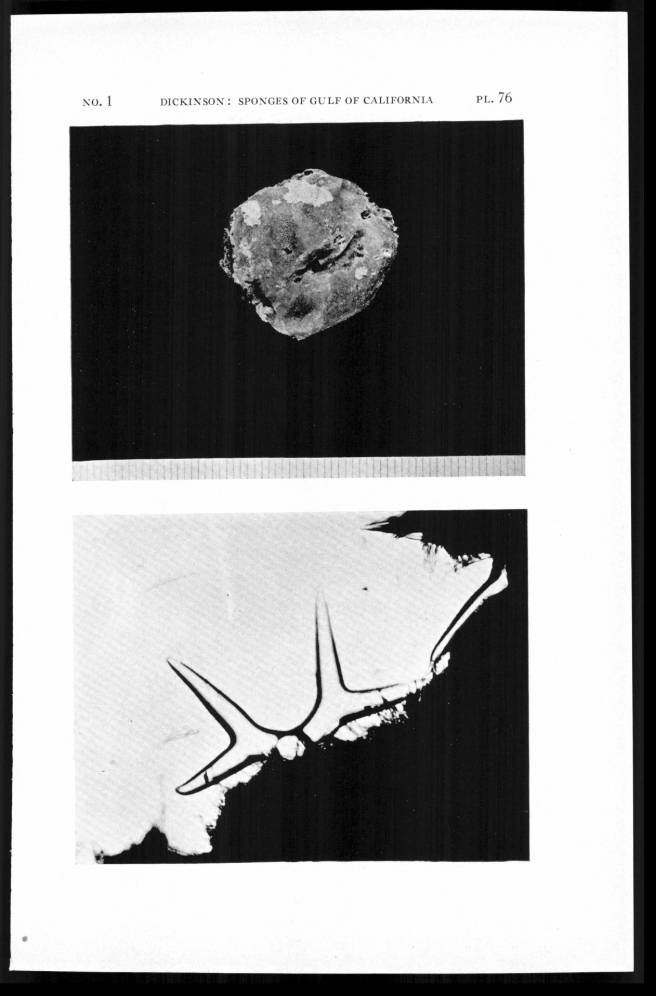
- Penares cortius

Scientific classification
- Kingdom: Animalia
- Phylum: Porifera
- Class: Demospongiae
- Order: Tetractinellida
- Family: Geodiidae
- Subfamily: Erylinae
- Genus: Penares; Gray, 1867

Type species
- Penares helleri (Schmidt, 1864)

Species
- See text.

Synonyms
- Jasplakina de Laubenfels, 1954; Pachamphilla Lendenfeld, 1907; Papyrula Schmidt, 1868

= Penares =

Genus of sponge

Penares is a widely distributed genus of demosponges, and was first described in 1867 by John Edward Gray.

== Description ==
These sponges are irregularly massive and have a thin cortex. Species belonging to this genus have dichotriaenes (spicules with pairs of branched rays) and oxeas (needle-like spicules with both ends pointed). Smooth microrhabds (modified microxeas (small oxeas) or microstrongyles (small rods with both ends blunt or rounded)) form a crust in the ectosome. Euasters (star-shaped microscleres with multiple rays radiating from a central point) may also be present.

== Species ==
The following species are recognised:

- Penares alatus (Lendenfeld, 1907)
- Penares angeli Sim-Smith, Hickman & Kelly, 2021
- Penares anisoxia Boury-Esnault, 1973
- Penares apicospinatus Desqueyroux-Faúndez & van Soest, 1997
- Penares astronavis Sim-Smith & Kelly, 2019
- Penares aureus Sim-Smith & Kelly, 2019
- Penares candidatus (Schmidt, 1868)
- Penares chelotropa Boury-Esnault, 1973
- Penares cortius de Laubenfels, 1930
- Penares deformis Sim-Smith & Kelly, 2019
- Penares dendyi (Hentschel, 1912)
- Penares euastrum (Schmidt, 1868)
- Penares foliaformis Wilson, 1904
- Penares hartmeyeri (Uliczka, 1929)
- Penares helleri (Schmidt, 1864)
- Penares hilgendorfi (Thiele, 1898)
- Penares hongdoensis Jeon & Sim, 2009
- Penares incrustans Tanita, 1963
- Penares intermedius (Dendy, 1905)
- Penares kermadecensis Sim-Smith & Kelly, 2019
- Penares mastoideus (Schmidt, 1880)
- Penares metastrosus (Lebwohl, 1914)
- Penares micraster Lévi, 1993
- Penares mollis Sim-Smith & Kelly, 2019
- Penares nux (de Laubenfels, 1954)
- Penares ochraceus (Carter, 1886)
- Penares okokewae Sim-Smith & Kelly, 2019
- Penares orbis Sim-Smith & Kelly, 2019
- Penares orthotriaena Burton, 1931
- Penares palmatoclada Lévi, 1993
- Penares saccharis (de Laubenfels, 1930)
- Penares scabiosus Desqueyroux-Faúndez & van Soest, 1997
- Penares schulzei (Dendy, 1905)
- Penares sclerobesus Topsent, 1904
- Penares sineastra Van Soest, 2017
- Penares sollasi Thiele, 1900
- Penares sphaera (Lendenfeld, 1907)
- Penares turmericolor Sim-Smith & Kelly, 2019
- Penares tylotaster Dendy, 1924
- Penares vermiculatus Sim-Smith & Kelly, 2019
