= Geodia amphistrongyla =

Scientific classification
- Kingdom: Animalia
- Phylum: Porifera
- Class: Demospongiae
- Order: Tetractinellida
- Family: Geodiidae
- Subfamily: Geodiinae
- Genus: Geodia
- Species: G. amphistrongyla

Binomial name
- Geodia amphistrongyla Lendenfeld, 1910

Species of sponge

Geodia amphistrongyla is a species of sponge in the family Geodiidae. The species is found in the tropical Pacific Ocean and was first described by Robert J. Lendlmayer von Lendenfeld in 1910.
