= Geodia arabica =

Scientific classification
- Domain: Eukaryota
- Kingdom: Animalia
- Phylum: Porifera
- Class: Demospongiae
- Order: Tetractinellida
- Family: Geodiidae
- Genus: Geodia
- Species: G. arabica

Binomial name
- Geodia arabica Carter, 1869

Synonyms
- Cydonium arabicum Carter, 1869

Species of sponge

Geodia arabica is a species of sponge in the family Geodiidae. It is found in the waters of the Arabian Sea and of the Red Sea. The species was first described by Henry John Carter in 1869.

== Bibliography ==
- Carter, H.J. (1869). A descriptive account of four subspherous sponges, Arabian and British, with general observations. Annals and Magazine of Natural History. (4) 4: 1-28, pls I-II.
