= ARMH1 =

Novel human gene

Identifiers
- Aliases: ARMH1, NCRNA00082, p40, chromosome 1 open reading frame 228, C1orf228, armadillo-like helical domain containing 1, armadillo like helical domain containing 1
- External IDs: MGI: 2686507; GeneCards: ARMH1

Gene location (Human)
Chr.	Chromosome 1 (human)
Band	1p34.1	Start	44,674,692 bp
Band	1p34.1	End	44,725,591 bp

Gene location (Mouse)
Chr.	Chromosome 4 (mouse)
Band	4|4 D1	Start	117,070,531 bp
Band	4|4 D1	End	117,109,322 bp
RNA expression pattern
Bgee	Human / Mouse (ortholog); Top expressed in: right uterine tube; granulocyte; monocyte; right lobe of liver; olfactory zone of nasal mucosa; lymph node; gonad; appendix; blood; thymus / Top expressed in: spermatid; spermatocyte; testicle; embryo; adrenal gland; hypothalamus; ovary; lung; lens; mesencephalon; More reference expression data
BioGPS	n/a
Orthologs
Databases	NCBI: entry; OMA: entry
Species	Human	Mouse
Entrez	339541	381544
Ensembl	ENSG00000198520	ENSMUSG00000060268
UniProt	Q6PIY5	n/a
RefSeq (mRNA)	NM_001004307; NM_001145636	NM_001033774; NM_001145637
RefSeq (protein)	NP_001139108	n/a
Location (UCSC)	Chr 1: 44.67 – 44.73 Mb	Chr 4: 117.07 – 117.11 Mb
PubMed search
- Wikidata
View/Edit Human	View/Edit Mouse

Armadillo-like Helical Domain Containing 1 (ARMH1) is a protein which in humans is encoded by chromosome 1 open reading frame 228, also known as the ARMH1 gene. The gene shows expression levels significantly higher in bone marrow, lymph nodes, and testis. Currently the function of this gene and subsequent protein is still uncertain.

== Gene ==
The ARMH1 gene is found on the plus strand of chromosome 1 between base pairs 45,140,361 and 45,191,784. Other known aliases include P40, NCRNA00082, and most commonly C1orf228. The gene has 13 exons, most of which are concentrated near the poly-A site at the end of the gene and two located upstream from the start codon. The gene is highly expressed in bone marrow and lymph nodes, suggesting an immunological function.

=== Gene expression ===
RNA seq data was produced using multiple samples of human tissues at varying stages of development. One study was acquired from 20 separate samples of human tissue showing significantly more expression of ARMH1 in the thymus, trachea, and lungs. A second study shows 27 different tissues samples in 95 different individual subjects. The expression levels are significantly higher in bone marrow, lymph nodes, and testis. A third shows high expression in white blood cells and testis again, corroborating previous studies. A temporal study focused on expression in different stages of development collected 35 human fetal samples, from 6 distinct tissues, between 10 and 20 weeks gestational time and sequenced using Illumina TruSeq Stranded Total RNA. The data slightly favored expression in the adrenal glands throughout development. In each of the other tissues there were no stark changes in expression through time, only a small decline of gene expression as development furthers.

=== Gene transcripts ===
The ARMH1 gene has extensive abilities to alter its function and size through isoforms. Gene isoforms are mRNAs that are produced from the same locus but are different in their transcription start sites, protein coding DNA sequences and/or untranslated regions, potentially altering gene function. All known isoforms are organized and listed below with information gathered from NCBI gene, and a Bioinformatics tool for calculating molecular weight.

Protein Isoform	Protein Accession	Protein Length	Molecular Weight	mRNA Isoform	mRNA Accession	mRNA length
X1	XP_047275293	446 aa	49.58 Kda	X5	XM_011541340	1693 bp
X2	XP_011539647	433 aa	48.17 Kda	X7	XM_011541345	1909 bp
X3	XP_047275308	431 aa	47.39 Kda	X8	XM_047419352	1782 bp
X4	XP_047275309	419 aa	46.17 Kda	X9	XM_047419353	1507 bp
X5	XP_047275314	405 aa	44.49 Kda	X12	XM_047419358	1588 bp
X6	XP_016856631	391 aa	43.58 Kda	X13	XM_017001142	1546 bp
X7	XP_047275318	379 aa	41.32 Kda	X14	XM_047419362	1393 bp
X8	XP_011539651	376 aa	41.67 Kda	X15	XM_011541349	1645 bp
X9	XP_016856632	365 aa	40.47 Kda	X16	XM_017001143	1468 bp
X10	XP_047275323	364 aa	40.17 Kda	X17	XM_047419367	1342 bp
X11	XP_054192270	338 aa	37.06 Kda	X18	XM_054336295	1264 bp
X12	XP_054192271	336 aa	36.46 Kda	X19	XM_054336296	1207 bp
X13	XP_054192272	333 aa	36.84 Kda	X20	XM_054336297	1474 bp
x14	XP_047275327	332 aa	36.65 Kda	X21	XM_047419371	1262 bp
x15	XP_054192274	274 aa	30.61 Kda	X23	XM_054336299	1670 bp
x16	XP_016856635	263 aa	29.31 Kda	X24	XM_017001146	1146 bp
x17	XP_054192276	242 aa	27.05 Kda	X25	XM_054336301	2306 bp
x18	XP_054192277	213 aa	23.69 Kda	X26	XM_054336302	1380 bp

== mRNA ==
The mRNA for this gene can be spliced in many different ways, making way for approximately 20 known isoforms. The most common mRNA gets spliced down to a coding region that is about 1693 nucleotides long which makes up 440 amino acids in total. In a comprehensive study on oral squamous cell carcinoma, the sixth most prevalent cancer worldwide, identified ARMH1 as a gene of interest by comparing healthy subjects mRNA against affected individuals. Through mRNA inhibition of ARMH1, researchers demonstrated significantly reduced leukemic cell proliferation (P=.0041) and leukemic cell migration (P=.0001), as well as a decreased resistance to the chemotherapy drug Cytarabine.

== Protein ==
The protein encoded by the gene goes by the same name, Armadillo like containing helical domain 1. The isoelectric point of the ARMH1 protein is around a pH of 5.5. The protein has 2 known major domains, one being a transmembrane domain and the other being a coiled coil. Within the coiled coil domains, the ARMH1 protein has 24 alpha helices. The European Bioinformatics Institute's analysis of ARMH1 reveals clearly a significantly enriched lysine content as well as a significantly deficient proline count. The protein has been proven to have one major interaction with the human protein known as ABAT. Gamma-aminobutyric acid transaminase (ABAT) catalyzes the conversion of gamma-aminobutyric acid (GABA) into succinic semialdehyde. Additionally, ABAT expression was associated with glycolysis-related genes, infiltrated immune cells, immunoinhibitors, and immunostimulators in HCC.

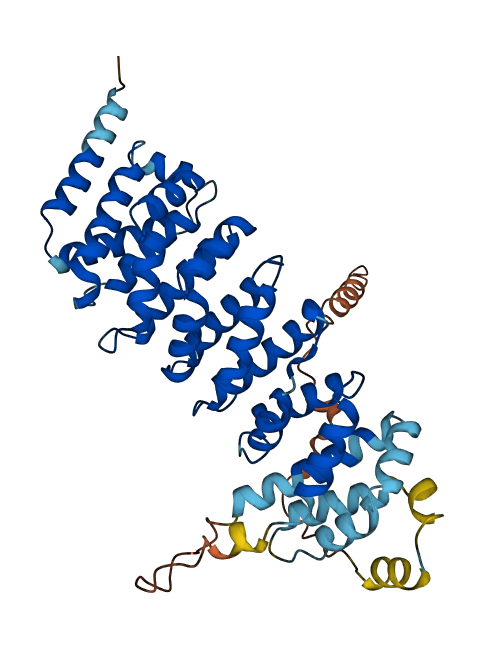
AlphaFold, the state-of-the-art AI system developed by DeepMind, is able to computationally predict protein structures in 3D space.

== Homology and evolution ==
The ARMH1 gene is extremely diverse and is found in thousands of different species. From primates to fungus, this gene has been evolutionarily relevant for hundreds of millions of years. While in near relatives such as cows, the similarity score is 91% that of our genome, in species of fungi the similarity ranges between 20 and 30%. While attempting to find homologs in any round or flat worms, single celled eukaryotes or prokaryotes, plants, or any fungi besides chitrids, there were no significantly similar genes found. Below is a table of orthologous genes in order of sequence similarity compared to the human ARMH1 isoform X1.

Species	Common name	Accession number	Date of divergence	Sequence length (AA)	Sequence similarity	Sequence identity
Homo sapiens	Human	NP_001139108	0 mya	440	100%	100%
Microcebus murinus	Grey Mouse Lemur	XP_012631405.1	74 mya	441	88%	82%
Rattus norvegicus	Brown Rat	NP_001119769.2	87 mya	441	80%	78%
Bos taurus	Cow	XP_005204913.1	94 mya	442	91%	83%
Ornithorhynchus anatinus	Platypus	XP_028938784.1	180 mya	459	75%	60%
Apteryx rowi	Oktarito Kiwi	XP_025942684	319 mya	419	73%	59%
Haliaeetus leucocephalus	Bald Eagle	XP_010581029	319 mya	418	70%	56%
Gopherus flavomarginatus	Bolson Tortoise	XP_050817160	319 mya	421	78%	65%
Xenopus tropicalis	Western Clawed Frog	XP_017949069	352 mya	409	70%	55%
Danio rerio	Zebra Fish	XP_001341083.1	429 mya	410	71%	53%
Leucoraja erinacea	Little Skate	XP_055497706	462 mya	406	69%	53%
Lytechinus pictus	Painted Urchin	XP_054764007	619 mya	406	67%	51%
Owenia fusiformis	Segmented Worm	CAH1776102.1	686 mya	410	71%	51%
Aplysia californica	California Sea Hare	XP_012936639.1	708 mya	410	69%	52%
Adineta sterineri	Rotifera	CAF4083605.1	708 mya	420	56%	37%
Pocillopora verrucosa	Colonial Coral	XP_058955966.1	708 mya	404	67%	49%
Geodia barretti	Sea Sponge	CAI8036895.1	758 mya	404	50%	35%
Blastocladiella britannica	Chytrids	KAI9218662	1275 mya	423	34%	22%
Borealophlyctis nickersoniae	Rhizophlyctidales	KAJ3289137	1275 mya	453	19%	11%

== Clinical significance ==
The ARMH1 gene and subsequent protein have been extensively linked to leukemia, specifically T-cell acute lymphoblastic leukemia (T-ALL). In mostly lymphatic tissue cell lines, T-ALL showed dramatically increased expression of the ARMH1 gene. Bone marrow samples were taken at the initial diagnosis and the conclusion of treatment and ARMH1 along with 5 other genes that were all found to be dramatically changed in expression. Researchers Dr. Manoj Bhasin and Dr. Mojtaba Bakhtiari from Emory University's Aflac Cancer Center have identified ARMH1, a novel cancer-associated gene, as being highly expressed in malignant blast cells across several pediatric hematologic malignancies, including AML, T/B-ALL, and T/B-MPAL. Importantly, ARMH1 expression is significantly elevated in patients with relapsed disease or high-risk cytogenetic profiles (e.g., MLL rearrangements) compared to those with standard-risk markers (e.g., RUNX1, inv(16)). Additionally, ARMH1 expression strongly correlates with the pediatric leukemia stem cell score (LSC6), a six-gene signature linked to poor prognosis.

Functional studies involving ARMH1 perturbation (via knockdown and overexpression) in leukemia cell lines revealed substantial effects on cell proliferation and migration. RNA sequencing of these modified cells highlighted associations between ARMH1 and pathways related to mitochondrial fatty acid synthesis and the cell cycle. Pharmacological inhibition of CPT1A, a key regulator of fatty acid synthesis in the mitochondrial matrix, led to ARMH1 downregulation, along with reduced CPT1A levels, ATP production, and oxygen consumption rates. Furthermore, ARMH1 knockdown caused a notable decrease in cell cycle regulators, including CDCA7 and EZH2.

The research also uncovered that ARMH1 physically interacts with EZH2, a protein implicated in multiple cancers, suggesting its critical role in oncogenesis. These findings establish ARMH1 as a key player in mitochondrial metabolism and cell cycle regulation, positioning it as a potential target for therapeutic intervention in pediatric hematologic malignancies.
