= Geodia apiarium =

Scientific classification
- Kingdom: Animalia
- Phylum: Porifera
- Class: Demospongiae
- Order: Tetractinellida
- Family: Geodiidae
- Genus: Geodia
- Species: G. apiarium

Binomial name
- Geodia apiarium Schmidt, 1870

Synonyms
- Caminus apiarium Schmidt, 1870; Isops apiarium (Schmidt, 1870)

Species of sponge

Geodia apiarium is a species of sea sponge in the family Geodiidae. It is found in the Gulf of Mexico off the coast of Florida.

== Bibliography ==
- Schmidt, O. (1870). Grundzüge einer Spongien-Fauna des atlantischen Gebietes. (Wilhelm Engelmann: Leipzig): iii-iv, 1-88, pls I-VI.
