= Geodia breviana =

Scientific classification
- Kingdom: Animalia
- Phylum: Porifera
- Class: Demospongiae
- Order: Tetractinellida
- Family: Geodiidae
- Subfamily: Geodiinae
- Genus: Geodia
- Species: G. breviana

Binomial name
- Geodia breviana Lendenfeld, 1910

Species of sponge

Geodia breviana is a species of sponge in the family Geodiidae. It is found in the waters of the Pacific Ocean off the coast of California. It was first described by Robert J. Lendlmayer von Lendenfeld in 1910.
