= Geodia nodastrella =

Scientific classification
- Domain: Eukaryota
- Kingdom: Animalia
- Phylum: Porifera
- Class: Demospongiae
- Order: Tetractinellida
- Family: Geodiidae
- Genus: Geodia
- Species: G. nodastrella

Binomial name
- Geodia nodastrella Carter, 1876

Synonyms
- Geodia divaricans Topsent, 1928; Geodia barretti var. divaricans Topsent, 1928; Geodia barretti var. nodastrella Carter, 1876

Species of sponge

Geodia nodastrella is a species of sponge in the family Geodiidae. It is found in the waters of the North Atlantic Ocean. The species was first described by Henry John Carter in 1876.

== Bibliography ==
- Carter, H.J. (1876). Descriptions and Figures of Deep-Sea Sponges and their Spicules, from the Atlantic Ocean, dredged up on board H.M.S.‘Porcupine’, chiefly in 1869 (concluded). Annals and Magazine of Natural History. (4) 18(105): 226–240; (106): 307–324; (107): 388–410;(108): 458–479, pls XII-XVI, page(s): 400-401
