= Geodia gibberosa =

Conservation status
- Least Concern (IUCN 2.3)

Scientific classification
- Kingdom: Animalia
- Phylum: Porifera
- Class: Demospongiae
- Order: Tetractinellida
- Family: Geodiidae
- Genus: Geodia
- Species: G. gibberosa

Binomial name
- Geodia gibberosa Lamarck, 1815

Synonyms
- Geodia cariboea Duchassaing & Michelotti, 1864; Geodia flexisclera Pulitzer-Finali, 1986

Species of sponge

Geodia gibberosa, commonly known as the white encrusting sponge, is a species of sea sponge found in the Caribbean. It is eaten by hawksbill turtles. It was first described by Lamarck in 1815.

== Description ==
Geodia gibberosa is a large, dense sponge. It can be white or pale tan when exposed to very little light, or dark brown in areas with a lot of it. It is usually in the form of a knobby, fist-like mass, often up to 50 cm in diameter. It may also occur as a spherical mass without projections and is also known to form large colonies that resemble rounded calcareous rocks. Its skeleton is a bunch of needle-like spicules radiating outward from the center near the surface, much more randomly dispersed on the inside.

== Distribution and habitat ==
Geodia gibberosa is found in the Bahamas, Florida, Brazil, and West Africa. It is commonly found in shallow waters with hard bottoms, generally in the same area as seagrasses.
