= Geodia auroristella =

Scientific classification
- Domain: Eukaryota
- Kingdom: Animalia
- Phylum: Porifera
- Class: Demospongiae
- Order: Tetractinellida
- Family: Geodiidae
- Genus: Geodia
- Species: G. auroristella

Binomial name
- Geodia auroristella Dendy, 1916

Species of sponge

Geodia auroristella is a species of sponge in the family Geodiidae. It is found in the waters of the Indian Ocean around the Seychelles archipelago. The species was first described by Arthur Dendy in 1916.

== Bibliography ==
- Dendy, A. (1916). Report on the Homosclerophora and Astrotetraxonida collected by H.M.S. ‘Sealark' in the Indian Ocean. In: Reports of the Percy Sladen Trust Expedition to the Indian Ocean in 1905, Vol. 6. Transactions of the Linnean Society of London. 17 (2): 225-271, pls 44-48.
