= Geodia atlantica =

Scientific classification
- Domain: Eukaryota
- Kingdom: Animalia
- Phylum: Porifera
- Class: Demospongiae
- Order: Tetractinellida
- Family: Geodiidae
- Genus: Geodia
- Species: G. atlantica

Binomial name
- Geodia atlantica Stephens, 1915

Synonyms
- Sidonops atlantica

Species of sponge

Geodia atlantica is a species of sponge in the family Geodiidae. It is found in the waters of the North Atlantic Ocean.

== Bibliography ==
- Stephens, J. 1915a. Sponges of the Coasts of Ireland. I.- The Triaxonia and part of the Tetraxonida. Fisheries, Ireland Scientific Investigations1914(4): 1-43, pls I-V.
- Cárdenas, P.; Rapp, H.T. (2015). Demosponges from the Northern Mid-Atlantic Ridge shed more light on the diversity and biogeography of North Atlantic deep-sea sponges. Journal of the Marine Biological Association of the United Kingdom. 95(7), 1475-1516 (read on line)
- Cárdenas, P.; Rapp, H.T.: Klitgaard, A.B.; Best, M.; Thollesson, M.; Tendal, O.S. (2013). Taxonomy, biogeography and DNA barcodes of Geodia species (Porifera, Demospongiae, Tetractinellida) in the Atlantic boreo-arctic region. Zoological Journal of the Linnean Society. 169, 251-311 (read on line)
