= Penicillium dipodomyis =

Scientific classification
- Kingdom: Fungi
- Division: Ascomycota
- Class: Eurotiomycetes
- Order: Eurotiales
- Family: Aspergillaceae
- Genus: Penicillium
- Species: P. dipodomyis

Binomial name
- Penicillium dipodomyis Banke, S.; Frisvad, J.C.; Rosendahl, S. 1997

Synonyms
- Penicillium chrysogenum var. dipodomyis, Penicillium dipodomyus

Species of fungus

Penicillium dipodomyis is a species of the genus of Penicillium which occurs in kangaroo rats and produces penicillin and the diketopiperazine dipodazine.

== See also ==
- List of Penicillium species
