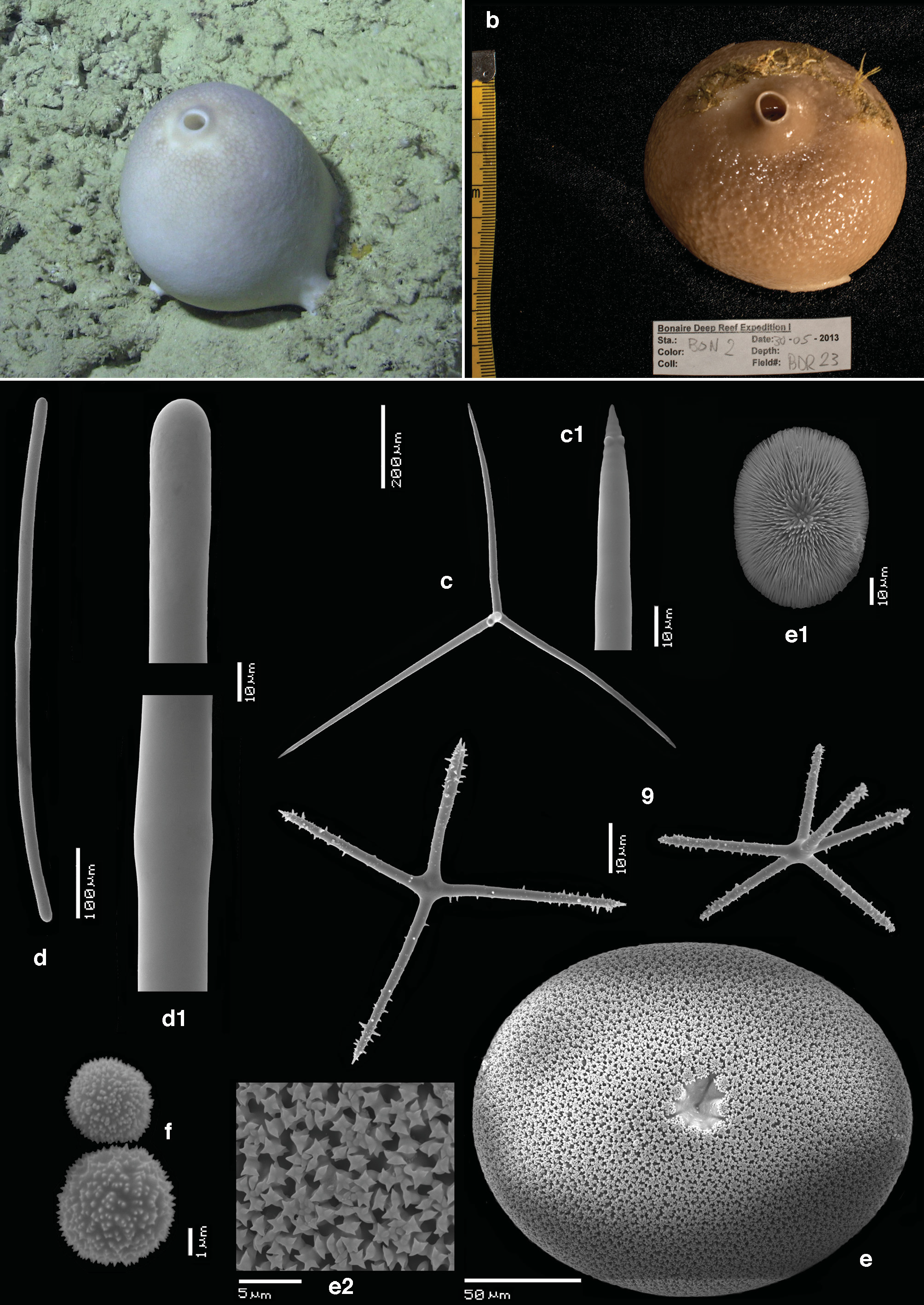
- Caminus carmabi

Scientific classification
- Kingdom: Animalia
- Phylum: Porifera
- Class: Demospongiae
- Order: Tetractinellida
- Family: Geodiidae
- Genus: Caminus; Schmidt, 1862

Species
- See text

Synonyms
- Geodistrongyla Hoshino, 1981

= Caminus =

Genus of sponges

Caminus is a genus of sea sponges belonging to the family Geodiidae.

== Species ==
- Caminus albus Pulitzer-Finali, 1996
- Caminus awashimensis Tanita, 1969
- Caminus carmabi Van Soest, Meesters & Becking, 2014
- Caminus chinensis Lindgren, 1897
- Caminus jejuensis Shim & Sim, 2012
- Caminus primus Sim-Smith & Kelly, 2015
- Caminus sphaeroconia Sollas, 1886
- Caminus strongyla (Hoshino, 1981)
- Caminus vulcani Schmidt, 1862
- Caminus xavierae Díaz & Cárdenas, 2024
