= Geodia arripiens =

Scientific classification
- Domain: Eukaryota
- Kingdom: Animalia
- Phylum: Porifera
- Class: Demospongiae
- Order: Tetractinellida
- Family: Geodiidae
- Genus: Geodia
- Species: G. arripiens

Binomial name
- Geodia arripiens Lindgren, 1897

Species of sponge

Geodia arripiens is a species of sponge in the family Geodiidae. It is found in the waters of the South China Sea. The species was first described by Nils Gustaf Lindgren in 1897.

== Bibliography ==
- Lindgren, N.G. (1897). Beitrag zur Kenntniss der Spongienfauna des Malaiischen Archipels und der Chinesischen Meere. Zoologische Anzeiger. 547: 480-487
