= Geodia composita =

Scientific classification
- Domain: Eukaryota
- Kingdom: Animalia
- Phylum: Porifera
- Class: Demospongiae
- Order: Tetractinellida
- Family: Geodiidae
- Genus: Geodia
- Species: G. composita

Binomial name
- Geodia composita Bösraug, 1913

Species of sponge

Geodia composita is a species of sponge in the family Geodiidae. The species was first described by Bösraug in 1913. It is found off the coasts of Mozambique.
