= Caminus strongyla =

Scientific classification
- Domain: Eukaryota
- Kingdom: Animalia
- Phylum: Porifera
- Class: Demospongiae
- Order: Tetractinellida
- Family: Geodiidae
- Genus: Caminus
- Species: C. strongyla

Binomial name
- Caminus strongyla (Hoshino, 1981)

Synonyms
- List: Geodia strongyla (Hoshino, 1981); Geodistrongyla strongyla Hoshino, 1981

Species of sponge

Caminus strongyla is a sponge species in the family Geodiidae. The species is found off the coasts of Japan and was first described by Kazuo Hoshino in 1981.
