= Penares hongdoensis =

Scientific classification
- Kingdom: Animalia
- Phylum: Porifera
- Class: Demospongiae
- Order: Tetractinellida
- Family: Geodiidae
- Genus: Penares
- Species: P. hongdoensis

Binomial name
- Penares hongdoensis Jeon & Sim, 2009

Species of sponge

Penares hongdoensis is a demosponge in the family, Geodiidae, found in Korea. It was first described in 2009 by Korean zoologists, Jong-Jin Jeon and Chung Ja Sim.

The holotype was collected at 20 m depth in the waters of Hongdo.
