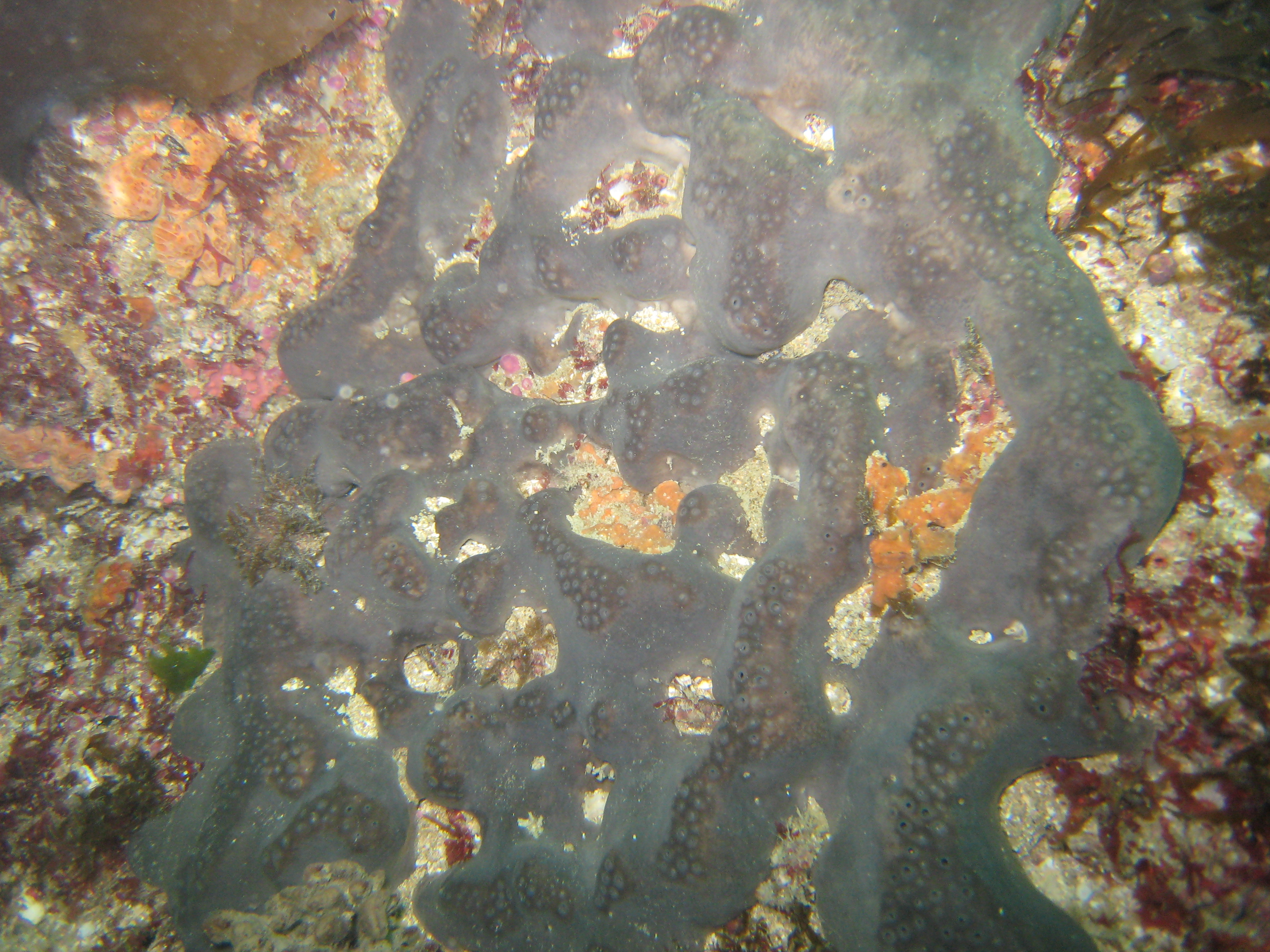

Scientific classification
- Domain: Eukaryota
- Kingdom: Animalia
- Phylum: Porifera
- Class: Demospongiae
- Order: Tetractinellida
- Family: Geodiidae
- Genus: Pachymatisma
- Species: P. johnstonia

Binomial name
- Pachymatisma johnstonia Bowerbank in Johnston, 1842

Synonyms
- Caminus osculosus Grübe, 1872; Halichondria johnstonia Bowerbank in Johnston, 1842

= Pachymatisma johnstonia =

Species of sponge

Pachymatisma johnstonia is a species of sponge belonging to the family Geodiidae. A species of the north-eastern Atlantic coasts, this is a usually grey encrusting sponge with large prominent oscula and a pale yellow interior. The size and form depends largely on the extent of its exposure to waves. In heavily wave-exposed locations, it is usually small and thin but in more sheltered places can grow to over 50 cm across and 15 cm thick.
