= Geodia hirsuta =

Scientific classification
- Domain: Eukaryota
- Kingdom: Animalia
- Phylum: Porifera
- Class: Demospongiae
- Order: Tetractinellida
- Family: Geodiidae
- Genus: Geodia
- Species: G. hirsuta

Binomial name
- Geodia hirsuta Sollas, 1886

Synonyms
- Cydonium hirsutum

Species of sponge

Geodia hirsuta is a species of sponge in the family Geodiidae. The species is found in the waters of Indonesia and was first described by Sollas in 1886 as Cydonium hirsutum.
