= Geodia alba =

Scientific classification
- Domain: Eukaryota
- Kingdom: Animalia
- Phylum: Porifera
- Class: Demospongiae
- Order: Tetractinellida
- Family: Geodiidae
- Genus: Geodia
- Species: G. alba

Binomial name
- Geodia alba (Kieschnick, 1896)

Synonyms
- Sidonops alba (Kieschnick, 1896); Synops alba Kieschnick, 1896

Species of sponge

Geodia alba is a species of sponge in the family Geodiidae. The species is found in the waters of Indonesia and was first described by Oswald Kieschnick in 1896 as Synops alba.
