= Geodia amadaiba =

Scientific classification
- Domain: Eukaryota
- Kingdom: Animalia
- Phylum: Porifera
- Class: Demospongiae
- Order: Tetractinellida
- Family: Geodiidae
- Genus: Geodia
- Species: G. amadaiba

Binomial name
- Geodia amadaiba Tanita & Hoshino, 1989

Species of sponge

Geodia amadaiba is a species of sponge from the family Geodiidae. The species is found in the waters of Japan and was first described by Tanita & Hoshino in 1989.
