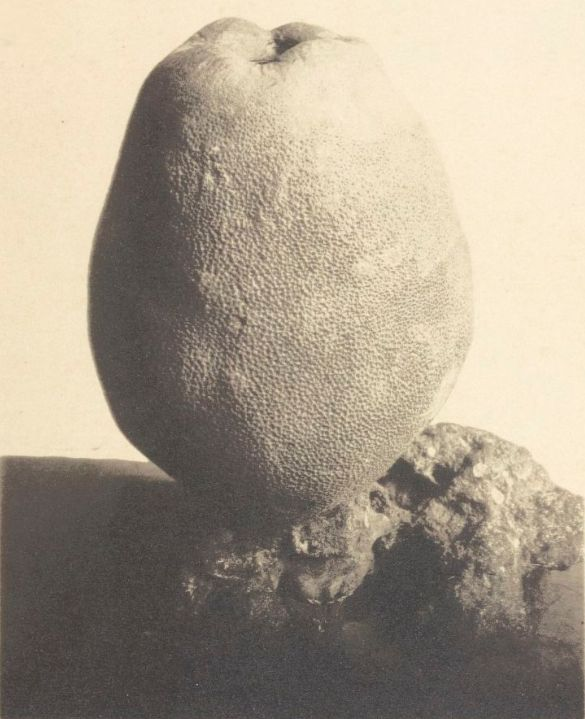
- Geodia megastrella

Scientific classification
- Domain: Eukaryota
- Kingdom: Animalia
- Phylum: Porifera
- Class: Demospongiae
- Order: Tetractinellida
- Family: Geodiidae
- Genus: Geodia
- Species: G. megastrella

Binomial name
- Geodia megastrella Carter, 1876

= Geodia megastrella =

Species of sponge

Geodia megastrella is a species of sponge in the family Geodiidae. It is a type of demosponge found in the deep temperate waters of the North Atlantic Ocean. It has characteristic stellar-shaped large spicules coined 'megastrellum', hence its name. The species was first described by Henry John Carter in 1876, after dredging it up aboard H.M.S. 'Porcupine', near the Cape St. Vincent in Portugal.

== Morphology ==
=== General Body Plan ===
- The size of Geodia megastrella ranges on average from 8 cm in diameter to 20 cm and usually takes on a spheroidal shape. They are resistant to compression due to their rigidity and thick cortex (1.5–3 mm). Its surface varies in texture, ranging from “smooth, to human-skin-like, to beehive-like patterns”. Their internal color in ethanol is lighter from their external color in ethanol: they are respectively cream and brown to light brown. They can have one or two osculum openings on the top, called a preoscule because it forms a small cavity with raised edges.

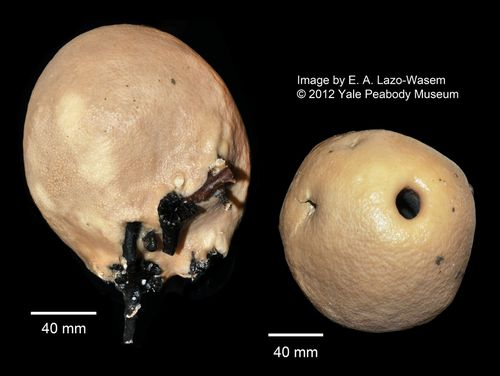
Geodia megastrella, top and bottom view

=== Spicules ===
==== Megascleres ====
- Oxeas I (average length and width: 2,998 μm and 46.8 μm)
- Oxeas II (average length and width: 372.4 μm and 6.8 μm)
- Orthotriaenes (average length and width: 3320 μm and 97 μm)

==== Microscleres ====
- Sterrasters: spherical to subspherical (average diameter and thickness: 212.6 μm 157.5 μm)
- Strongyl asters: (average diameter: 7.2 μm)
- Oxyasters I: rough actines (average diameter: 90.5 μm with 5-9 actines (star-shaped spicules), 121.3 μm for 3-2 actines)
- Oxyasters II: thin rough actines (average diameter: 29.4 μm)

== Variation within Geodia megastrella ==
When the DNA sequence of Geodia megastrella that is found in the Gulf of Cadiz was compared to a depressio-minibarcode sequence from two other Geodia megastella samples it was found to be one hundred percent identical. However, when the same depressio-minibarcode sequence was compared to a Geodia megastrella found in Scotland and a Geodia megastrella found in the Irving Seamount there was found to be a one base pair difference.

== Distribution ==
=== Biogeography ===
Geodia megastrella has only been found in the Northern Atlantic Ocean, above the equator., However, its range is very wide. It has been found in both the northeastern and northwestern parts of the Atlantic, as well as the middle. It has been observed in the following countries:

- Barbados
- Bermuda
- Iceland
- Norway
- Portugal
- The United States

=== Bathymetry ===
- While they can be found in water ranging from 140m to 155m their main observed range varies from 200m deep down to 2,600m deep.

== Taxonomy ==
- Kingdom Animalia
  - Phylum Porifera
    - Class Demospongiae
      - Subclass Tetractinomorpha
        - Order Astrophorida
          - Family Geodiidae
            - Species Geodia megastrella

== Bibliography ==
- Carter, H.J. (1876). Descriptions and Figures of Deep-Sea Sponges and their Spicules, from the Atlantic Ocean, dredged up on board H.M.S.‘Porcupine’, chiefly in 1869 (concluded). Annals and Magazine of Natural History. (4) 18(105): 226-240; (106): 307-324; (107): 388-410;(108): 458-479, pls XII-XVI, page(s): 400-401
- Van Soest, R.W.M. 2001. Porifera, in: Costello, M.J. et al. (Ed.) (2001). European register of marine species: a check-list of the marine species in Europe and a bibliography of guides to their identification. Collection Patrimoines Naturels, 50: pp. 85–103
- Burton, M. (1956). The sponges of West Africa. Atlantide Report (Scientific Results of the Danish Expedition to the Coasts of Tropical West Africa, 1945-1946, Copenhagen). 4: 111-147.
- Topsent, E. (1911). Sur une magnifique Geodia megastrella. Archives du Musée de la Rochelle (Bulletin de la Société des Sciences Naturelles de la Rochelle). 1-7, pl. 1.
- Cárdenas, P.; Xavier, J.R.; Reveillaud, J.; Schander, C.; Rapp, H.T. (2011). Molecular Phylogeny of the Astrophorida (Porifera, Demospongiaep) Reveals an Unexpected High Level of Spicule Homoplasy. PLoS ONE. 6 (4), e18318.
- Cárdenas, P.; Rapp, H.T. (2015). Demosponges from the Northern Mid-Atlantic Ridge shed more light on the diversity and biogeography of North Atlantic deep-sea sponges. Journal of the Marine Biological Association of the United Kingdom. 95(7), 1475-1516.
- Cárdenas, P.; Moore, J.A. (2017). First records of Geodia demosponges from the New England seamounts, an opportunity to test the use of DNA mini-barcodes on museum specimens. Marine Biodiversity.
- Topsent, E. (1928). Spongiaires de l’Atlantique et de la Méditerranée provenant des croisières du Prince Albert ler de Monaco. Résultats des campagnes scientifiques accomplies par le Prince Albert I. Monaco. 74:1-376, pls I-XI.
- Sollas, W.J. (1888). Report on the Tetractinellida collected by H.M.S. Challenger, during the years 1873-1876. Report on the Scientific Results of the Voyage of H.M.S. Challenger, 1873-1876. Zoology. 25(63): 1-458, pls I-XLIV, 1 map.
