= Geodia cooksoni =

Scientific classification
- Kingdom: Animalia
- Phylum: Porifera
- Class: Demospongiae
- Order: Tetractinellida
- Family: Geodiidae
- Genus: Geodia
- Species: G. cooksoni

Binomial name
- Geodia cooksoni Sollas, 1888

Synonyms
- Cydonium cooksoni

Species of sponge

Geodia cooksoni is a sponge species in the family Geodiidae. The species was first described by British scientist William Johnson Sollas in 1888 under the name Cydonium cooksoni. It is found in the waters of the Pacific Ocean around the Galápagos Islands.

== Bibliography ==
- Sollas, W.J. (1888). Report on the Tetractinellida collected by H.M.S. Challenger, during the years 1873-1876. Report on the Scientific Results of the Voyage of H.M.S. Challenger during the years 1873–76. Zoology. 25 (part 63): 1-458, pl. 1-44, 1 map
