= Geodia exigua =

Scientific classification
- Domain: Eukaryota
- Kingdom: Animalia
- Phylum: Porifera
- Class: Demospongiae
- Order: Tetractinellida
- Family: Geodiidae
- Genus: Geodia
- Species: G. exigua

Binomial name
- Geodia exigua Thiele, 1898

Species of sponge

Geodia exigua is a species of sponge that produces the sesquiterpene spiro compound exiguamide. The species was first described by Johannes Thiele in 1898. It is a marine organism known from Japan.
