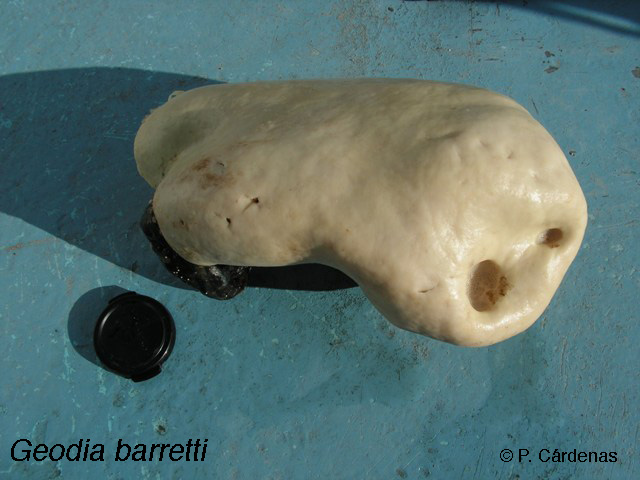
- Geodia barretti

Scientific classification
- Kingdom: Animalia
- Phylum: Porifera
- Class: Demospongiae
- Order: Tetractinellida
- Family: Geodiidae
- Subfamily: Geodiinae
- Genus: Geodia; Lamarck, 1815

Species
- See text

Synonyms
- List: Cydonium Fleming, 1828; Geodia (Cydonium) Fleming, 1828; Geodia (Geodia) Lamarck, 1815; Geodia (Isops) Sollas, 1880; Geodia (Sidonops) Sollas, 1889; Geodia (Stellogeodia) Czerniavsky, 1880; Geodia (Synops) Vosmaer, 1882; Geodinella Lendenfeld, 1903; Isops Sollas, 1880; Pyxitis Schmidt, 1870; Sidonops Sollas, 1889; † Silicosphaera Hughes, 1985; Sydonops [lapsus]; Synops Vosmaer, 1882

= Geodia =

Geodia Temporal range: Early Campanian - Present

Genus of sponges

Geodia is a genus of sea sponge belonging to the family Geodiidae. It is the type genus of its taxonomic family.

This genus is characterized by a high density of siliceous spicules. Members of this genus are known to be eaten by hawksbill turtles.

== Species ==
- Geodia acanthylastra Lendenfeld, 1910
- Geodia agassizi Lendenfeld, 1910
- Geodia alba (Kieschnick, 1896)
- Geodia amadaiba Tanita & Hoshino, 1989
- Geodia amphistrongyla Lendenfeld, 1910
- Geodia anceps (Vosmaer, 1894)
- Geodia angulata (Lendenfeld, 1910)
- Geodia apiarium (Schmidt, 1870)
- Geodia arabica Carter, 1869
- Geodia areolata Carter, 1880
- Geodia arma Lehnert & Stone, 2019
- Geodia arripiens Lindgren, 1897
- †Geodia asteroderma Hughes, 1985
- Geodia ataxastra Lendenfeld, 1910
- Geodia atlantica (Stephens, 1915)
- Geodia auroristella Dendy, 1916
- Geodia australis Da Silva & Mothes, 2000
- Geodia barretti Bowerbank, 1858
- Geodia basilea Lévi, 1964
- Geodia berryi (Sollas, 1888)
- Geodia bibilonae Díaz & Cárdenas, 2024
- Geodia bicolor (Lendenfeld, 1910)
- Geodia boesraugi Van Soest & Hooper, 2020
- Geodia breviana Lendenfeld, 1910
- Geodia californica (Lendenfeld, 1910)
- Geodia campbellensis Sim-Smith & Kelly, 2015
- Geodia canaliculata Schmidt, 1868
- Geodia carcinophila (Lendenfeld, 1897)
- Geodia carolae (Lendenfeld, 1910)
- Geodia carteri Sollas, 1888
- Geodia chathamensis Sim-Smith & Kelly, 2015
- Geodia cidaris (Lamarck, 1815)
- Geodia composita Bösraug, 1913
- Geodia conchilega Schmidt, 1862
- Geodia contorta (Bowerbank, 1873)
- Geodia cooksoni (Sollas, 1888)
- Geodia copiosa Sim-Smith & Kelly, 2015
- Geodia corticostylifera Hajdu, Muricy, Custodio, Russo & Peixinho, 1992
- Geodia cribrata Rützler, Piantoni, van Soest & Díaz, 2014
- Geodia crustosa Bösraug, 1913
- Geodia cumulus Schmidt, 1870
- Geodia curacaoensis Van Soest, Meesters & Becking, 2014
- Geodia cydonium (Linnaeus, 1767)
- Geodia cylindrica Thiele, 1898
- Geodia dendyi Burton, 1926
- Geodia depressa Bowerbank, 1873
- Geodia distincta Lindgren, 1897
- Geodia dura (Tendal, 1969)
- Geodia dysoni Bowerbank, 1873
- Geodia echinastrella Topsent, 1904
- Geodia eosaster (Sollas, 1888)
- Geodia erinacea (Lendenfeld, 1888)
- Geodia ewok Sim-Smith & Kelly, 2015
- Geodia exigua Thiele, 1898
- Geodia flemingii Bowerbank, 1873
- Geodia gallica (Lendenfeld, 1907)
- Geodia garoupa Carvalho, Lopes, Cosme & Hajdu, 2016
- Geodia geodina (Schmidt, 1868)
- Geodia gibberella de Laubenfels, 1951
- Geodia gibberosa Lamarck, 1815
- Geodia glariosa (Sollas, 1886)
- Geodia globosa (Baer, 1906)
- Geodia globostellifera Carter, 1880
- Geodia globus Schmidt, 1870
- Geodia harpago Sim-Smith & Kelly, 2015
- Geodia hentscheli Cárdenas, Rapp, Schander & Tendal, 2010
- Geodia hilgendorfi Thiele, 1898
- Geodia hirsuta (Sollas, 1886)
- Geodia hyotania (Tanita, 1965)
- Geodia imperfecta Bowerbank, 1874
- Geodia inaequalis Bowerbank, 1873
- Geodia inconspicua (Bowerbank, 1873)
- Geodia isabella (Dickinson, 1945)
- Geodia japonica Sollas, 1888
- Geodia jousseaumei (Topsent, 1906)
- Geodia kermadecensis Sim-Smith & Kelly, 2015
- Geodia kuekenthali Thiele, 1900
- Geodia labyrinthica (Kirkpatrick, 1903)
- Geodia lacunata (Lamarck, 1815)
- Geodia lebwohli Van Soest & Hooper, 2020
- Geodia leosimi Sim-Smith & Kelly, 2015
- Geodia libera Stephens, 1915
- Geodia lindgreni (Lendenfeld, 1903)
- Geodia littoralis Stephens, 1915
- Geodia lophotriaena Lendenfeld, 1910
- Geodia macandrewii Bowerbank, 1858
- Geodia magellani (Sollas, 1886)
- Geodia margarita Sim-Smith & Kelly, 2015
- Geodia matrix Díaz & Cárdenas, 2024
- Geodia media Bowerbank, 1873
- Geodia megaster Burton, 1926
- Geodia megastrella Carter, 1876
- Geodia mesotriaena Lendenfeld, 1910
- Geodia mesotriaenella Lendenfeld, 1910
- Geodia micraster (Lendenfeld, 1907)
- Geodia micropora Lendenfeld, 1910
- Geodia micropunctata Row, 1911
- Geodia microsphaera Díaz & Cárdenas, 2024
- Geodia microspinosa (Wilson, 1925)
- Geodia neptuni (Sollas, 1886)
- Geodia nigra Lendenfeld, 1888
- Geodia nilslindgreni Van Soest & Hooper, 2020
- Geodia nitida (Sollas, 1886)
- Geodia nodastrella Carter, 1876
- Geodia nodosa (Sim-Smith & Kelly, 2015)
- Geodia obscura (Thiele, 1898)
- Geodia orthomesotriaena Lebwohl, 1914
- Geodia ostracomorpha (Lévi & Lévi, 1989)
- Geodia ovifractus Burton, 1926
- Geodia ovis Lendenfeld, 1910
- Geodia oxyastra (Lendenfeld, 1910)
- Geodia pachydermata (Sollas, 1886)
- Geodia papyracea Hechtel, 1965
- Geodia parasitica Bowerbank, 1873
- Geodia parva Hansen, 1885
- Geodia paupera Bowerbank, 1873
- Geodia perarmata Bowerbank, 1873
- Geodia pergamentacea Schmidt, 1870
- Geodia peruncinata Dendy, 1905
- Geodia philippinensis Wilson, 1925
- Geodia phlegraei (Sollas, 1880)
- Geodia phlegraeioides Díaz & Cárdenas, 2024
- Geodia picteti (Topsent, 1897)
- Geodia placenta Schmidt, 1862
- Geodia pleiades (Sollas, 1888)
- Geodia pocillum Van Soest, 2017
- Geodia poculata Bösraug, 1913
- Geodia praelonga Sim-Smith & Kelly, 2015
- Geodia punctata Hentschel, 1909
- Geodia ramodigitata Carter, 1880
- Geodia ramosa (Topsent, 1928)
- Geodia regina Dendy, 1924
- Geodia reniformis Thiele, 1898
- Geodia reticulata Bowerbank, 1874
- Geodia rex Dendy, 1924
- Geodia riograndensis Silva & Mothes, 2000
- Geodia robusta Lendenfeld, 1907
- Geodia rovinjensis Müller et al., 1983
- Geodia sadiemillsae Sim-Smith & Kelly, 2015
- Geodia sagitta Sim-Smith & Kelly, 2015
- Geodia senegalensis Topsent, 1891
- Geodia sollasi (Lendenfeld, 1888)
- Geodia sparsa Wilson, 1925
- Geodia sphaeroides (Kieschnick, 1896)
- Geodia sphaerulifer (Vacelet & Vasseur, 1965)
- Geodia spheranthastra Pulitzer-Finali, 1993
- Geodia spherastrea Lévi, 1964
- Geodia spherastrella Topsent, 1904
- Geodia spherastrosa (Wilson, 1925)
- Geodia splendida Silva & Mothes, 2000
- Geodia starki Lehnert, Stone & Drumm, 2014
- Geodia stellata Lendenfeld, 1907
- Geodia stellosa (Czerniavsky, 1880)
- Geodia stromatodes (Uliczka, 1929)
- Geodia sulcata Van Soest, 2017
- Geodia tenera Sim-Smith & Kelly, 2015
- Geodia thomsonii Schmidt, 1870
- Geodia tuberculosa Bowerbank, 1872
- Geodia tuberosa Schmidt, 1862
- Geodia tumulosa Bowerbank, 1872
- Geodia tylastra Boury-Esnault, 1973
- Geodia ulleungensis Sim & Kang, 2004
- Geodia vadi Sim-Smith & Kelly, 2015
- Geodia variospiculosa Thiele, 1898
- Geodia vaubani Lévi & Lévi, 1983
- Geodia vestigifera (Dendy, 1924)
- Geodia vosmaeri (Sollas, 1886)
- Geodia williami Sim-Smith & Kelly, 2015
