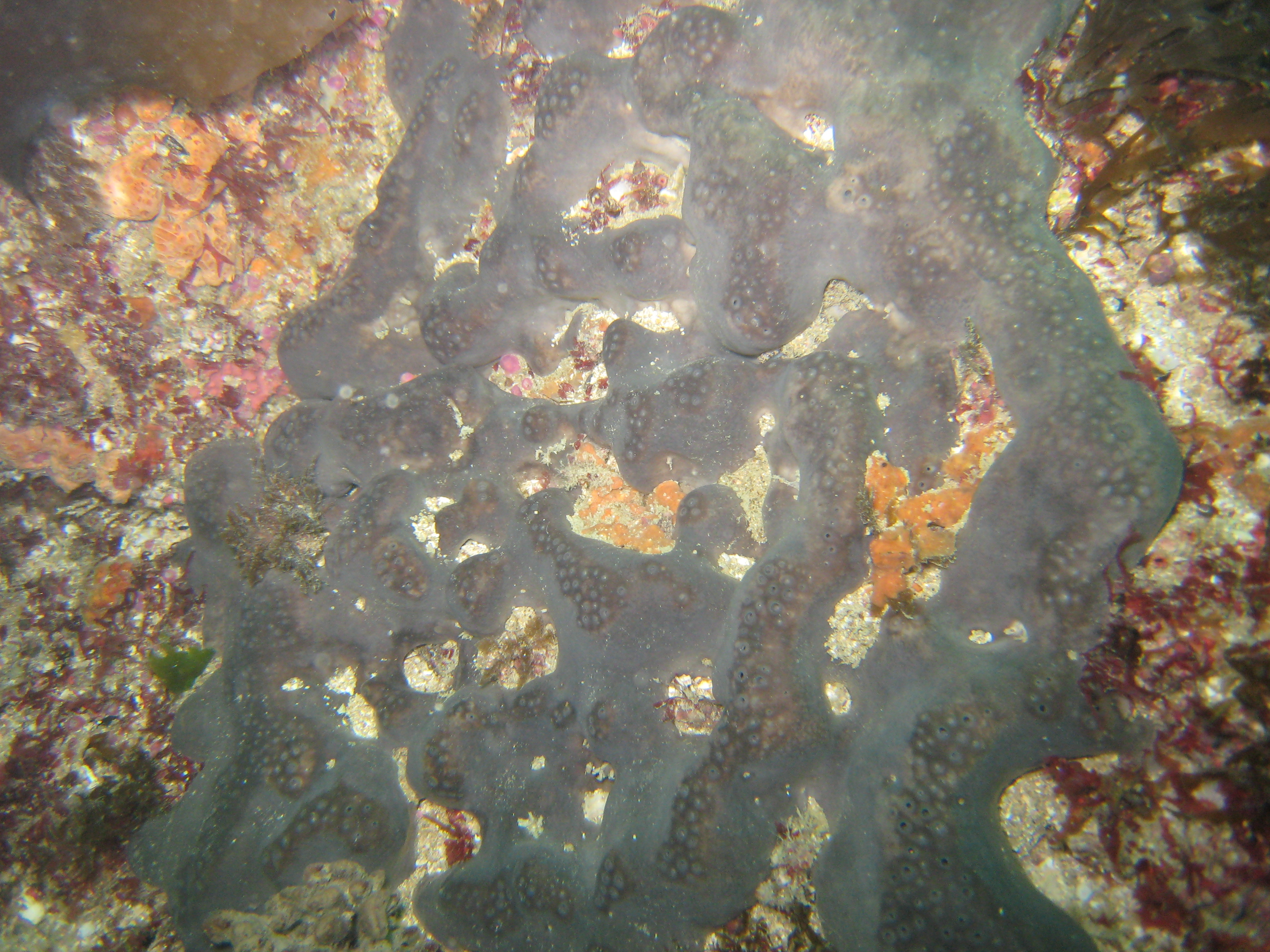
- Pachymatisma johnstonia

Scientific classification
- Domain: Eukaryota
- Kingdom: Animalia
- Phylum: Porifera
- Class: Demospongiae
- Order: Tetractinellida
- Family: Geodiidae
- Subfamily: Erylinae
- Genus: Pachymatisma; Bowerbank in Johnston, 1842

Species
- see text

= Pachymatisma =

Genus of sponges

Pachymatisma is a genus of sponges belonging to the family Geodiidae.

== Species ==
- Pachymatisma areolata Bowerbank, 1872
- Pachymatisma bifida Burton, 1959
- Pachymatisma johnstonia (Bowerbank in Johnston, 1842)
- Pachymatisma monaena Lendenfeld, 1907
- Pachymatisma normani Sollas, 1888
