= Geodia macandrewii =

Scientific classification
- Kingdom: Animalia
- Phylum: Porifera
- Class: Demospongiae
- Order: Tetractinellida
- Family: Geodiidae
- Genus: Geodia
- Species: G. macandrewii

Binomial name
- Geodia macandrewii Bowerbank, 1858

Synonyms
- Cydonium normani; Geodia normani

Species of sponge

Geodia macandrewii is a species of sponge in the family Geodiidae. It is found in the waters of the North Atlantic Ocean. The species was first described by James Scott Bowerbank in 1858.

== Bibliography ==
- Bowerbank, J.S. (1858). On the Anatomy and Physiology of the Spongiadae. Part I. On the Spicula. Philosophical Transactions of the Royal Society. 148(2): 279–332, pls XXII-XXVI
