= Barettin =

Identifiers
CAS Number	104311-70-8
3D model (JSmol)	Interactive image
ChEMBL	ChEMBL255898
ChemSpider	9352680
PubChem CID	11177588
UNII	LAM9W2P97T
CompTox Dashboard (EPA)	DTXSID101317811
- InChI: InChI=1S/C17H19BrN6O2/c18-10-3-4-11-9(8-22-13(11)7-10)6-14-16(26)23-12(15(25)24-14)2-1-5-21-17(19)20/h3-4,6-8,12,22H,1-2,5H2,(H,23,26)(H,24,25)(H4,19,20,21)/b14-6-/t12-/m0/s1 Key: YYFNNPXWRXQUPR-JVXNRYDGSA-N
- SMILES: C1=CC2=C(C=C1Br)NC=C2C=C3C(=O)NC(C(=O)N3)CCCN=C(N)N

Properties
Chemical formula	C_{17}H_{19}BrN_{6}O_{2}
Molar mass	419.283 g·mol^{−1}
- Except where otherwise noted, data are given for materials in their standard state (at 25 °C [77 °F], 100 kPa). Infobox references

Barettin is a brominated alkaloid made of a dehydrogenated brominated derivative of tryptophan linked by two peptide bonds to an arginine residue, forming a 2,5-diketopiperazine nucleus. It is a cyclic dipeptide and a cyclized tryptamine. The compound occurs naturally in certain sea sponges and is known to interact with certain serotonin receptors.

== Natural occurrence ==
Barettin is the major compound in the deep-sea sponge Geodia barretti. It was isolated for the first time in 1986 by Göran Lidgren, Lars Bohlin and Jan Bergman at Uppsala University, Sweden but the correct chemical structure was determined later in 2002. Barettin is written with one 'r' because the authors misspelled Geodia barretti with one 'r' in the original paper.

== Pharmacology ==
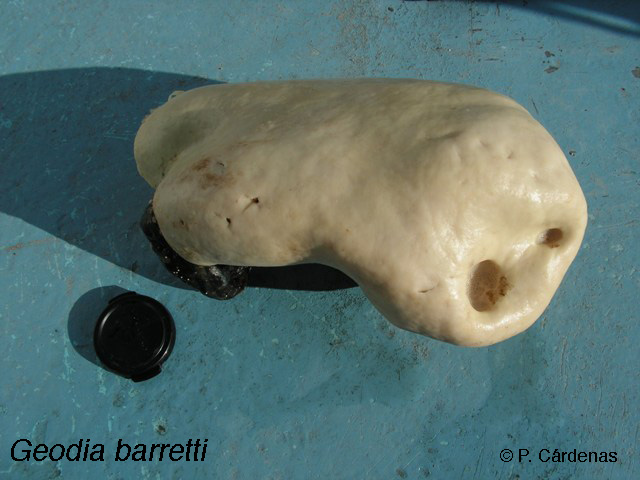
Geodia barretti (dried specimen).

Barettin shows affinity for the serotonin 5-HT_{2} receptors. It has analgesic effects that are reversed by the serotonin 5-HT_{2A} receptor antagonist ketanserin, suggesting that barettin's analgesic effects may be mediated by serotonin 5-HT_{2A} receptor signaling. Subsequently, barettin was found to act as an inverse agonist of the serotonin 5-HT_{2A} receptor, with this action mediating its analgesic effects. In accordance with its lack of activation of the serotonin 5-HT_{2A} receptor, barettin failed to produce the head-twitch response, a behavioral proxy of psychedelic effects, in rodents.

Barettin seems to show antioxidant and anti-inflammatory properties which could be userful in treating diseases that affect the immune system and diseases that are caused by inflammation. Atherosclerosis, a disease characterized by stiffening and a buildup of compounds in arteries, may be prevented by barettin due to its anti-inflammatory properties. The effects barettin has on inflammation may be due to its inhibitory properties on two protein kinases, receptor-interacting serine/threonine kinase 2 (RIPK2) and calcium/calmodulin-dependent protein kinase 1α (CAMK1α).

== See also ==
- Substituted tryptamine
