= Geodia hentscheli =

Scientific classification
- Kingdom: Animalia
- Phylum: Porifera
- Class: Demospongiae
- Order: Tetractinellida
- Family: Geodiidae
- Genus: Geodia
- Species: G. hentscheli

Binomial name
- Geodia hentscheli Cárdenas, Rapp, Schander & Tendal, 2010

Synonyms
- Geodia mesotriaena (Hentschel, 1929); Sidonops mesotriaena Hentschel, 1929

Species of sponge

Geodia hentscheli is a species of sponge in the family Geodiidae. It is found in the waters of the North Atlantic Ocean. The species was described in 2010 by Paco Cárdenas, Hans Tore Rapp, Christoffer Schander & Ole S. Tendal.
