= Sponge ground =

Deep-sea habitats formed by large accumulations of sponges

Sponge grounds, also known as sponge aggregations, are intertidal to deep-sea habitats formed by large accumulations of sponges (glass sponges and/or demosponges), often dominated by a few massive species. Sponge grounds were already reported more than 150 years ago, but the habitat was first fully recognized, studied and described in detail around the Faroe Islands during the inter-Nordic BIOFAR 1 programme 1987–90. These were called Ostur (meaning "cheese" and referring to the appearance of the sponges) by the local fishermen and this name has to some extent entered the scientific literature. Sponge grounds were later found elsewhere in the Northeast Atlantic and in the Northwest Atlantic, as well as near Antarctica. They are now known from many other places worldwide and recognized as key marine habitats.

Sponge grounds are important habitats supporting diverse ecosystems. During a study of outer shelf and upper slope sponge grounds at the Faroe Islands, 242 invertebrate species were found in the vicinity and 115 were associated with the sponges. In general, fish fauna associated with sponge grounds are poorly known, but include rockfish and gadiforms. Sponge grounds are threatened, especially by bottom trawling and other fishing gear, dredging, oil and gas exploration and undersea cables, but potentially also by deep sea mining, carbon dioxide sequestration, pollution and climate change.

== Prehistoric sponge grounds ==
By studying spicules in sediments cores taken from sponge grounds on the slopes of the Flemish Cap and Grand Bank (off Newfoundland, Canada), scientists managed to detect the presence of sponges in the past. The oldest record for Geodiidae sponges in this region was found in a long core collected in the slope of the Grand Bank, where typical sterraster spicules were found in the top of a submarine landslide deposit older than 25 000 BP. Continuous presence of sponges was recorded on the southeastern region of the Flemish Cap as far as 130 000 BP. It seems the distribution range of the Geodiidae in this area significantly expended after the deglaciation.
