= Johannes Thiele (zoologist) =

German zoologist

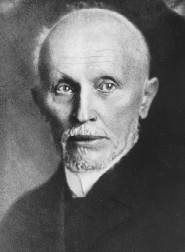
- Born: 1 October 1860; Goldap, East Prussia
- Died: 5 August 1935 (aged 74)
- Known for: Handbuch der systematischen Weichtierkunde (Handbook of Systematic Malacology
- Scientific career
- Fields: Malacology
- Institutions: Museum für Naturkunde Berlin
- Author abbrev. (zoology): Thiele

Karl Hermann Johannes Thiele (1 October 1860 – 5 August 1935) was a German zoologist specialized in malacology. Thiele was born in Goldap, East Prussia. His Handbuch der systematischen Weichtierkunde (English edition published by the Smithsonian under the title Handbook of Systematic Malacology) is a standard work. From 1904 until his retirement in 1925 he was the curator of the malacological collection at the Museum für Naturkunde (Museum of Natural History) in Berlin. Thiele described more than 1.500 new species of molluscs; until today their types are deposited with the Museum of Natural History in Berlin. Especially important are his works on the Mollusca of the First German Antarctica Expedition and of the German Deep Sea Expedition aboard the vessel Valdivia.

Thiele's classification of Gastropoda was in use up to the end of the 20th century. It modified an earlier concept of Henri Milne-Edwards (1848) with three subclasses: Prosobranchia, Opisthobranchia and Pulmonata. Thiele's classification was based on overall similarity between the species. This classification has been modified over the years, one recent example being the classification of Ponder & Lindberg, 1997, based on phylogenetic arguments. He became the first to describe Geodia exigua in 1898.

== Bibliography ==
- 1891–1893. Das Gebiss der Schnecken, zur Begründung einer natürlichen Classification. Bd. 2, 402 p., Berlin (Nicolaische Verlagsbuchhandlung. (Continuation of the work started by Franz Hermann Troschel in 1866–1879).
  - 1891. Das Gebiis der Schnecken, zur Begründung einer natürlichen Classification. Nicolai, Berlin, 2(7): 249–334, plates 25–28.
  - 1893. Das Gebiis der Schnecken, zur Begründung einer natürlichen Classification. Nicolai, Berlin, 2(8): 337–409, plates 29–32.
- 1891. Die Stammesverwandtschaft der Mollusken. Ein Beitrag zur Phylogenie der Tiere. Jenaische Zeitschrift für Naturwissenschaft 25, 480–543.
- 1892. Wurmmollusken. Sitzungsberichte der naturwissenschaftlichen Gesellschaft ISIS in Dresden 1892, 3–4.
- 1894. Über die Zungen einiger Landdeckelschnecken. Nachrichtsblatt der Deutschen Malakozoologischen Gesellschaft 26, 23–25.
- 1894. Beiträge zur vergleichenden Anatomie der Amphineuren. I. Über einige Neapler Solenogastres. Zeitschrift für wissenschaftliche Zoologie 58, 222–302.
- 1895. Hemitrichia guimarasensis n. sp. Nachrichtsblatt der Deutschen Malakozoologischen Gesellschaft 27, 131–132.
- 1895bÜber die Verwandtschaftsbeziehungen der Amphineuren. Biologisches Centralblatt 15, 859–869.
- 1897. Zwei australische Solenogastres. Zoologischer Anzeiger 19, 398–400.
- 1900. Verzeichnis der von Herrn Dr. Alfred Voeltzkow gesammelten marinen und litoralen Mollusken. Abhandlungen herausgegeben von der Senckenbergischen Naturforschenden Gesellschaft 26, 241–252.
- 1900. Proneomenia thulensis n. sp.. In: Fauna Artica, Eine Zusammenstellung der arktischen Tierformen, mit besonderer Berücksichtigung des Spitzbergen-Gebietes auf Grund der Ergebnisse der Deutschen Expedition in das Nördliche Eismeer im Jahre 1898 (Römer, F. & Fritz Schaudinn, ed.), vol. 1, 111–116.
- 1902. Proneomenia amboinensis n. sp. Denkschriften der Medizinisch-Naturwissenschaftlichen Gesellschaft zu Jena 8, 733–738.
- 1906. Zwei neue Macrodontes-Arten. Nachrichtsblatt der Deutschen Malakozoologischen Gesellschaft 38, 69–71
- Martens & Thiele, J. 1908. Beschreibung einiger im östlichen Borneo von Dr. Martin Schmidt gesammelten Land- und Süßwasser-Conchylien. Mitteilungen aus dem zoologischen Museum in Berlin 4, 251–291.
- Thiele & Jaeckel 1931. Muscheln der Deutschen Tiefsee-Expedition. In: Wissenschaftliche Ergebnisse der Deutschen Tiefsee-Expedition auf dem Dampfer "Valdivia" 1898–1899 (Chun, C. ed.), vol. 21, No. 1, Gustav Fischer Verlag, Jena.
- 1910. Molluskenfauna Westindiens. Zoologische Jahrbücher Abteilung für Systematik, Ökologie und Geographie der Tiere Suppl.11, 109–132.
- 1910. Eine arabische Ennea und Bemerkungen über andere Arten. Sitzungsberichte der Gesellschaft naturforschender Freunde zu Berlin 6, 280–284.
- 1911. Mollusken der deutschen Zentralafrika-Expedition. In: Wissenschaftliche Ergebnisse der deutschen Zentralafrika-Expedition 1907 bis 1908, vol. 3, 175–214.
- 1911. Die Fauna Südwest-Australiens. Ergebnisse der Hamburger südwest-australischen Forschungsreise 1905, vol. Band III, Lieferung 11, Prof. Dr. W. Michaelsen und Dr. R. Hartmeyer, Verlag von Gustav Fischer Verlag in Jena.
- 1912. Die antarktischen Schnecken und Muscheln, In: Deutsche Südpolar-Expedition 1901–1903 (Erich von Drygalski, E.v. ed.), vol. 8, No. 5, Georg Reimer, Berlin.
- 1920. Familia Limidae. In: Systematisches Conchylien-Cabinet von Martini und Chemnitz (Küster, H.C., Wilhelm Kobelt & Fritz Haas ed.), vol. 7, No. 2, Bauer & Raspe, Nürnberg.
- 1925. Thiele J., 1925. Gastropoden der Deutschen Tiefsee-Expedition. In:. Wissenschaftliche Ergebnisse der Deutschen Tiefsee-Expedition auf dem Dampfer “Valdivia” 1898–1899 II. Teil, vol. 17, No. 2, Gustav Fischer, Berlin
- 1927. Über die Familie Assimineidae. Zoologische Jahrbücher Abteilung für Systematik, Ökologie und Geographie der Tiere 53, 113–146.
- 1927. Über einige brasilianische Landschnecken. Abhandlungen herausgegeben von der Senckenbergischen Naturforschenden Gesellschaft 40, 305–329.
- 1928. Revision des Systems der Hydrobiiden und Melaniiden. Zoologische Jahrbücher, Abteilung Systematik, Ökologie und Geographie der Tiere 55, 351–402.
- 1928. Mollusken vom Bismarck-Archipel, von Neu-Guinea und Nachbar-Inseln. Zoologische Jahrbücher Abteilung für Systematik, Ökologie und Geographie der Tiere 55, 119–146.
- 1929–1935. Handbuch der Systematischen Weichtierkunde. 2 Bände. 1–1154. 1154 p., 584 figs.
- 1930. Gastropoda und Bivalvia. In: Die Fauna Südwest-Australiens. Ergebnisse der Hamburger südwest-asutralischen Forschungsreise 1905 (Michaelsen, W. & Hartmeyer, R. ed.), vol. 5, No. 8, 561–596.
- 1931. Über einige hauptsächlich afrikanische Landschnecken. Sitzungsberichte der Gesellschaft naturforschender Freunde zu Berlin 1930, 392–403.
