= Gualtherus Carel Jacob Vosmaer =

Dutch zoologist

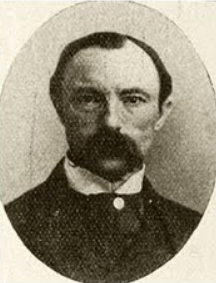
- Born: 19 August 1854; Oud-Beijerland
- Died: 23 September 1916 (aged 62); Leiden
- Scientific career
- Fields: zoology, sponges
- Author abbrev. (zoology): Vosmaer

Gualtherus Carel Jacob Vosmaer (Oud-Beijerland, August 19, 1854 - Leiden, September 23, 1916 ) was a Dutch zoologist.

== Biography ==
GCJ Vosmaer was born in 1854 in Oud-Beijerland, where his father, the poet and critic Carel Vosmaer was then a clerk at the subdistrict court. He studied in The Hague and subsequently at the University of Leiden, where he obtained his doctorate in 1880 with a thesis on sponges ("Leucandra aspera and the Canal System of Sponges"). In 1882 he became Anton Dohrn's assistant at his zoological station in Naples. In 1889 he returned to the Netherlands and became assistant to Professor Ambrosius Hubrecht in Utrecht. Later he became a private teacher and lecturer in Utrecht and in 1904 he became professor of zoology in Leiden.

== Work ==
Vosmaer was a specialist in the field of sponges, describing many species. In Naples he examined the sponges in the Bay of Naples. He also described the sponges collected during the Willem Barents expedition to the North Atlantic and Arctic Ocean in 1880-1881 and during the Siboga expedition of 1899-1900.

The genus Vosmaeropsis Dendy, 1893, is named for him.
