= Glionitrin A =

Names
- IUPAC name (3R,10aR)-3-(hydroxymethyl)-2-methyl-7-nitro-2,3-dihydro-10H-3,10a-epidithiopyrazino[1,2-a]indole-1,4-dione

Identifiers
CAS Number	1116153-15-1
3D model (JSmol)	Interactive image
ChemSpider	28286042
PubChem CID	42611028
- InChI: InChI=1S/C13H11N3O5S2/c1-14-10(18)12-5-7-2-3-8(16(20)21)4-9(7)15(12)11(19)13(14,6-17)23-22-12/h2-4,17H,5-6H2,1H3 Key: VRFJINVAZRAFHH-UHFFFAOYSA-N
- SMILES: CN1C(=O)C23CC4=C(N2C(=O)C1(SS3)CO)C=C(C=C4)[N+](=O)[O-]

Properties
Chemical formula	C_{13}H_{11}N_{3}O_{5}S_{2}
Molar mass	353.37 g·mol^{−1}
Appearance	Yellow powder
Melting point	181-182 °C
- Except where otherwise noted, data are given for materials in their standard state (at 25 °C [77 °F], 100 kPa). Infobox references

Glionitrin A is an antibiotic-anticancer compound made by microbes found in an abandoned mine. The total synthesis of (−)-glionitrin A was reported by Daniel Strand and co-workers in 2021.
