= Diketopiperazine =

Class of chemical compounds

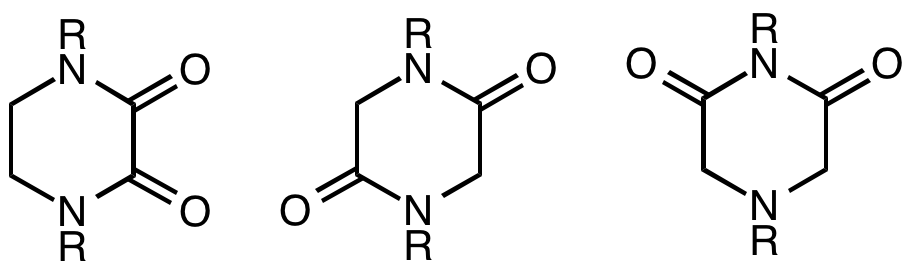
The diketopiperazines: 2,3-, 2,5, and 2,6-isomers.

A diketopiperazine (DKP), also known as a dioxopiperazine or piperazinedione, is a class of organic compounds related to piperazine but containing two amide linkages. DKP's are the smallest known class of cyclic peptide. Despite their name, they are not ketones, but amides. Three regioisomers are possible, differing in the locations of the carbonyl groups.

Retosiban is a diketopiperazine being investigated as an oral drug.

- One isomer is an oxamide obtained from ethylenediamine.
- 2,5-Diketopiperazines are cyclodipeptides often obtainable via condensation of two α-amino acids.
- 2,6-Diketopiperazines may be viewed as cyclized imide derivatives derived from iminodiacetic acids.

Of these three isomeric diketopiperazines, the 2,5-derivatives have attracted the greatest interest. Due to their appearance in biologically active natural products, medicinal chemists have been inspired to use DKPs to circumvent the poor physical and metabolic properties of peptides in the course of drug discovery.

== Natural sources ==
DKPs are synthesized by a wide range of organisms, including bacteria, fungi, more complex marine microorganisms, and even mammals. However, 90% of gram-negative bacteria synthesize these molecules, making them the target of most studies.

== Biological activity ==
DKPs have been shown to inhibit the activities of bacteria, fungi, viruses, and potentially protozoa, as well as exhibit antitumor and antiprion properties. The molecule glionitrin, for instance, proved to be very effective against methicillin-resistant Staphylococcus aureus (MRSA), in addition to four different human cancer cell lines in vitro. As antivirals, however, DPKs appear to have a poor outlook when compared to those already on the market.

Despite the great potential for diversity in this class of molecules, natural DPKs containing proline are significantly overrepresented among those known to be biologically active. There also appears to be some bias with regards to stereochemistry, as DD-stereoisomers tend to display stronger antibiotic capabilities.
