= ABAT =

Protein-coding gene in humans

Identifiers
- Aliases: ABAT, Abat, 9630038C02Rik, AI255750, ENSMUSG00000051226, Gabaat, Gabat, Gm9851, I54, Laibat, X61497, GABA-AT, NPD009, 4-aminobutyrate aminotransferase
- External IDs: OMIM: 137150; MGI: 2443582; GeneCards: ABAT
Enzyme activity
EC #	BRENDA	ExPASy	KEGG	MetaCyc
2.6.1.19	↗	↗	↗	↗
2.6.1.22	↗	↗	↗	↗

Gene location (Human)
Chr.	Chromosome 16 (human)
Band	16p13.2	Start	8,674,596 bp
Band	16p13.2	End	8,784,575 bp

Gene location (Mouse)
Chr.	Chromosome 16 (mouse)
Band	16|16 A1	Start	8,331,293 bp
Band	16|16 A1	End	8,439,432 bp
RNA expression pattern
Bgee	Human / Mouse (ortholog); Top expressed in: Brodmann area 23; endothelial cell; middle temporal gyrus; dorsal motor nucleus of vagus nerve; inferior olivary nucleus; entorhinal cortex; postcentral gyrus; external globus pallidus; orbitofrontal cortex; lateral nuclear group of thalamus / Top expressed in: nucleus accumbens; left lobe of liver; central gray substance of midbrain; globus pallidus; medial vestibular nucleus; dorsal tegmental nucleus; lateral hypothalamus; deep cerebellar nuclei; arcuate nucleus; nucleus of stria terminalis; More reference expression data
BioGPS	n/a
Gene ontology
Molecular function	transferase activity; 4-aminobutyrate transaminase activity; protein homodimerization activity; transaminase activity; iron-sulfur cluster binding; metal ion binding; succinate-semialdehyde dehydrogenase binding; catalytic activity; (S)-3-amino-2-methylpropionate transaminase activity; pyridoxal phosphate binding; 4-aminobutyrate:2-oxoglutarate transaminase activity
Cellular component	4-aminobutyrate transaminase complex; mitochondrial matrix; neuron projection; mitochondrion
Biological process	positive regulation of dopamine metabolic process; positive regulation of aspartate secretion; response to cocaine; gamma-aminobutyric acid biosynthetic process; response to hypoxia; locomotory behavior; behavioral response to cocaine; negative regulation of blood pressure; positive regulation of inhibitory postsynaptic potential; response to nicotine; ageing; gamma-aminobutyric acid metabolic process; negative regulation of platelet aggregation; cerebellum development; copulation; neurotransmitter catabolic process; response to iron ion; negative regulation of gamma-aminobutyric acid secretion; exploration behavior; positive regulation of heat generation; negative regulation of dopamine secretion; response to ethanol; positive regulation of uterine smooth muscle contraction; positive regulation of insulin secretion; positive regulation of prolactin secretion; gamma-aminobutyric acid catabolic process
Sources:Amigo / QuickGO
Orthologs
Databases	NCBI: entry; OMA: entry
Species	Human	Mouse
Entrez	18	268860
Ensembl	ENSG00000183044	ENSMUSG00000057880
UniProt	P80404	P61922
RefSeq (mRNA)	NM_000663; NM_001127448; NM_020686	NM_001170978; NM_172961
RefSeq (protein)	NP_000654; NP_001120920; NP_065737	NP_001164449; NP_766549
Location (UCSC)	Chr 16: 8.67 – 8.78 Mb	Chr 16: 8.33 – 8.44 Mb
PubMed search
- Wikidata
View/Edit Human	View/Edit Mouse

4-Aminobutyrate aminotransferase is a protein that in humans is encoded by the ABAT gene. This gene is located in chromosome 16 at position of 13.2. This gene goes by a number of names, including, GABA transaminase, GABAT, 4-aminobutyrate transaminase, NPD009 etc. This gene is mainly and abundant located in neuronal tissues. 4-Aminobutyrate aminotransferase belongs to group of pyridoxal 5-phosphate-dependent enzyme which activates a large portion giving reaction to amino acids. ABAT is made up of two monomers of enzymes where each subunit has a molecular weight of 50kDa. It is identified that almost tierce of human synapses have GABA. GABA is a neurotransmitter that has different roles in different regions of the central and peripheral nervous systems. It can be found also in some tissues that do not have neurons. In addition, GAD and GABA-AT are responsible in regulating the concentration of GABA.

== Characteristic ==
GABA's feature is that it does not fluorescent nor electroactive which is why it is hard to determine the reaction of enzymes because no peroxidase and dehydrogenase was identified. One characteristic of GABA is having low lipophilic which results in the difficulty to cross the blood brain barrier. A lot of researchers have been trying to discover molecules that have a property of high lipophilicity. The quantification of GABA concentration during cell activity needs to have high spatial and temporal resolution. As before, high performance liquid chromatography (HPLC) was used in quantifying GABA concentration levels. In present time, GABA is now analyze, measured in small volume with a short period of time with the use of electrochemiluminescence. GABA acts as a tropic factor which then affects some cell activity such as rapid cell reproduction, cell death and differentiation. Intracellular communication is also one of the many functions of GABA outside the nervous system.

== Function ==
4-Aminobutyrate aminotransferase (ABAT) is responsible for catabolism of gamma-aminobutyric acid (GABA), an important, mostly inhibitory neurotransmitter in the central nervous system, into succinic semialdehyde. The active enzyme is a homodimer of 50-kD subunits complexed to pyridoxal-5-phosphate. The protein sequence is over 95% similar to the pig protein. ABAT in liver and brain is controlled by 2 codominant alleles with a frequency in a Caucasian population of 0.56 and 0.44. GABA acts as a tropic factor which then affects some cell activity such as rapid cell reproduction, cell death and differentiation. Intracellular communication is also one of the many functions of GABA outside the nervous system. GABA-transaminaze enzyme production was made of ABAT gene command. The main function of ABAT acts as inhibition (neurotransmitter), where it prevents overloading activity of the brain from large amount of signals.

ABAT activates the beginning of deterioration of GABA. Likewise, suppression of ABAT results in depletion of transient lower esophageal sphincter relaxation (TLESR) and acid reflux activity. Treating of GERD is possible means of suppressing ABAT's physiology.

== ABAT Deficiency ==
ABAT defect is uncommon disorder. The signs and symptoms of this deficiency were observed from a Dutch family, two of the siblings, and a 6-month pediatric Japanese. These patients have same signs and symptoms that were observed. This include low muscle tone or known as floppy baby syndrome, over responsive reflexes and developmental delay. The ABAT deficiency phenotype includes psychomotor retardation, hypotonia, hyperreflexia, lethargy, refractory seizures, and EEG abnormalities. Multiple alternatively spliced transcript variants encoding the same protein isoform have been found for this gene. Abnormal GABA-transaminaze enzyme results in encephalopathy which is observed in pediatric patients and this deficiency have life expectancy of less than 2 years and some survived more than the given life expectancy. Abnormal protein that is being set free from uncontrolled amount of GABA will affect the growth of individual (growth hormone).

Decrease level of GABA concentration results in convulsion.

== Medicine ==
Vigabatrin is a drug that is irreparably suppresses GABA transaminase that causes increased amount of GABA in the brain.

== Discovery ==
In a recent study, it was found out that the increase amount of GABA will stop the consequences of drug addiction. The suppression of ABAT which causing the amount of GABA to increase has a connection to children with those suffer from movement disability. This gene is also link as one genetic cause of GERD.

ABAT has been proved that it is important in mitochondrial nucleoside.
