= Eduard Oscar Schmidt =

German zoologist and phycologist (1823–1886)

Oskar Schmidt
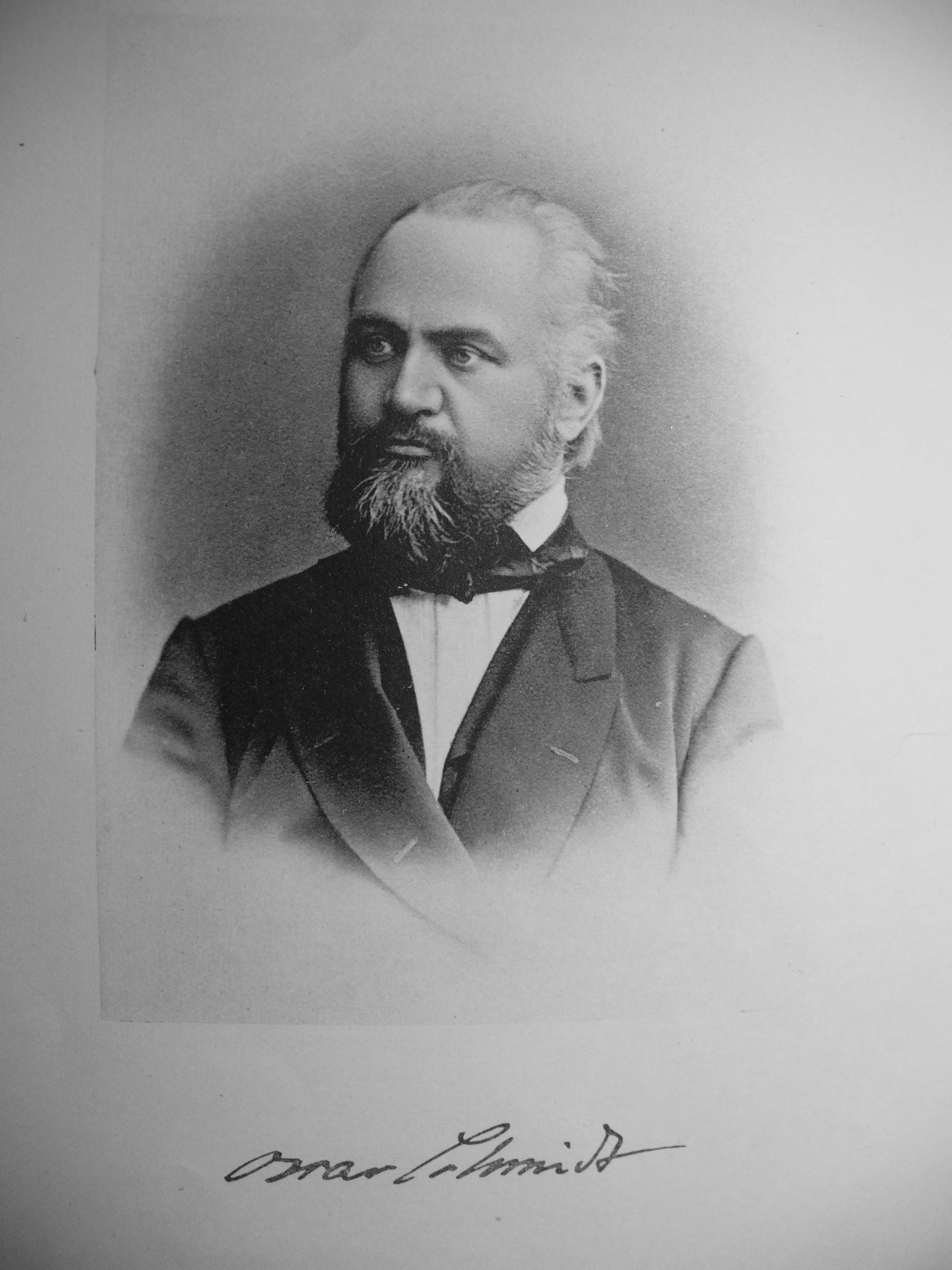
- Born: 21 February 1823; Torgau
- Died: 17 January 1886 (aged 62); Kappelrodeck
- Occupation(s): Zoologist, phycologist

Eduard Oscar Schmidt (21 February 1823, in Torgau – 17 January 1886, in Kappelrodeck) was a German zoologist and phycologist.

== Biography ==
He initially studied mathematics and science at Halle, then continued his education in Berlin, where he came under the influence of Christian Gottfried Ehrenberg and Johannes Peter Müller. In 1847 he received his habilitation at the University of Jena, becoming an associate professor during the following year. In 1855 was he appointed professor of zoology at the University of Cracow. Later he taught classes at the Universities of Graz (from 1857) and Strasbourg (from 1872 till his death in 1886).

Schmidt was an early proponent of Darwinian evolutionary thought. He is remembered for his research of Porifera (sponges), particularly species from the Adriatic Sea. Schmidt also made contributions in the field of phycology.

As far back as 1862 Oscar Schmidt showed that "cuttings" of sponges will attach themselves and grow. This idea was followed through in the experiments of Croatian scientist Grgur Bučić on the island of Hvar, from 1863 to 1872, but these experiments were brought to a close by the hostility of the native fishermen.

== Written works ==
Schmidt built a reputation based upon a handbook of comparative anatomy, the 9th edition of which, by Arnold Lang, was issued under the title Lehrbuch der vergleichenden Anatomie der wirbellosen Tiere (1888–1894). He made significant contributions to Brehms Tierleben, and was the author of several treatises on sponges. The following are some of his principal writings:

- Bilder aus dem Norden - Images of the North, based on Schmidt's second expedition to the Faeroe Islands and the North Cape, 1851.
- Goethes Verhältnis zu den organischen Naturwissenschaften, 1853.
- Lehrbuch der Zoologie - Textbook of zoology, 1854.
- Die Entwicklung der vergleichenden Anatomie - Development of comparative anatomy, 1855.
- Die Spongien des adriatischen Meeres - Sponges of the Adriatic Sea, 1862.
- Das Alter der Menschheit und das Paradies, (with Franz Unger, 1866).
- Descendenzlehre und Darwinismus - The Doctrine of Descent and Darwinism, (1873, 3rd edition 1884).
- Darwinismus und Socialdemokratie, Bon, 1878.
- Leitfaden der Zoologie (4th edition 1882).
- Die Säugethiere in ihrem Verhältnis zur Vorwelt, 1884.

== See also ==
- Category:Taxa named by Eduard Oscar Schmidt
