= Henry John Carter =

British surgeon and scientist in India

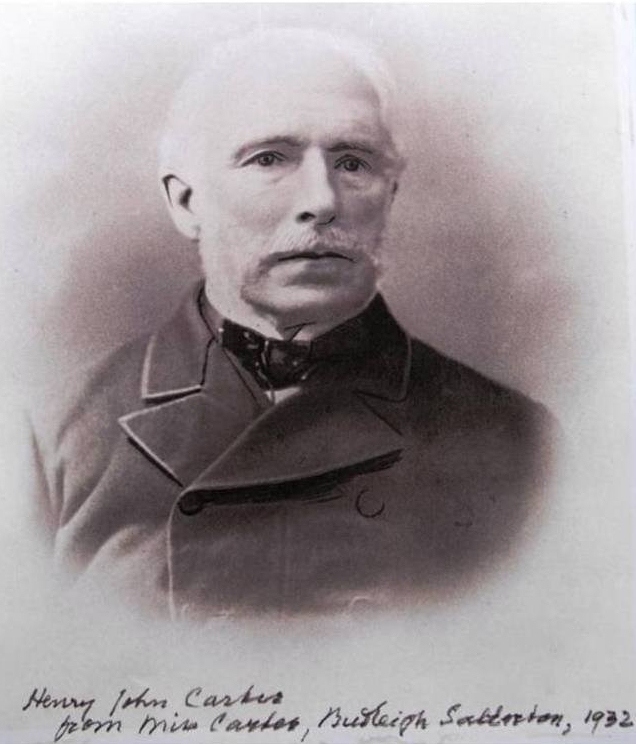
- Born: 18 August 1813; Budleigh Salterton, Devon, United Kingdom
- Died: 4 May 1895 (aged 81); Budleigh Salterton, Devon, United Kingdom
- Education: University College
- Known for: Geology of the Western India
- Awards: 1872 Royal Medal of the Royal Society
- Scientific career
- Fields: Geology
- Workplaces: Her Majesty's Indian Service, Bombay Establishment

Henry John Carter, FRS (18 August 1813 – 4 May 1895) was a surgeon working in Bombay, India, who carried out work in geology, paleontology, and zoology. He worked as an army surgeon in Bombay from 1859 on Her Majesty's Indian Service, Bombay Establishment. He edited a collection of geological papers on Western India, including a summary of the geology of India, which was published in 1857. Many items of his published work appeared in the journal of the Bombay Branch of the Royal Asiatic Society, and in the Annals of Natural History. He was elected a Fellow of the Royal Society in 1859.

== Life and work ==
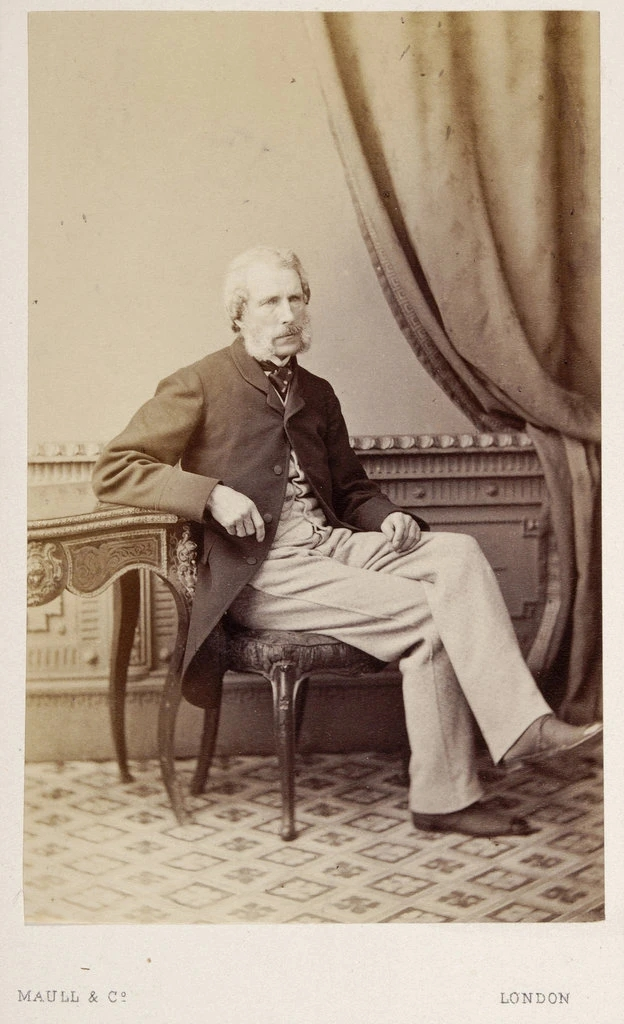
Carte-de-visite, c. 1870

Carter joined the Devon and Exeter Hospital at the age of sixteen, and graduated from University College in 1837 and obtained admission to the College of Surgeons in 1838. He was house surgeon for a year and then conservator of the museum. He visited Ecole de Medecine in Paris in 1840 and joined the East India Company in 1841. He served in Calcutta, Madras and Mauritius. He saw action at the battle of Hyderabad in Sindh on March 24, 1843 under Sir Charles Napier. He served with the 21st regiment of foot in the desert where he suffered ill health. He served on the survey ship Palinurus from 1844 to 1846 when he became an assistant civil surgeon at Bombay. He served as an honorary secretary at the Medical and Physical Society and at the Royal Asiatic Society. He worked on the geology and paleontology of western India, founding a natural history society in 1856 that did not live very long. Carter retired to England in 1862 with the rank of Surgeon-Major and settled in his native place, Budleigh Salterton where he then married Anne Doyle from Sligo, Ireland in 1864 and they had a daughter Annie in 1866. On 4 October 1888 he suffered from a paralytic attack which impaired his speech and eyesight. In the spring of 1895 his health declined seriously, and he died on the evening of 4 May. He is buried at East Budleigh.

== Awards ==
Carter took a special interest in sponges under J.E. Gray at the Natural History Museum. He was awarded the Royal Society's Royal Medal in 1872 for "...his long continued and valuable researches in zoology, and more especially for his inquiries into the natural history of the Spongiadae."

A number of taxa are named after him including:

- Acanthella carteri Dendy, 1889
- Carterella Potts, 1881
- Carteria Gray, 1872 - also Carteria Diesing, 1866 [Alga]
- Carterias Schwartschevski, 1905
- Carteriospongia Hyatt, 1877
- Chondropsis carteri Dendy, 1895
- Clathria carteri Topsent, 1889
- Coelocarteria Burton, 1934
- Echinoclathria carteri Rildey & Dendy, 1886
- Ecionemia carteri Dendy, 1905
- Erylus carteri Sollas, 1888
- Forcepia carteri Dendy, 1896
- Geodia carteri Sollas, 1888
- Haliclona carteri Burton, 1959
- Hamacantha carteri Topsent, 1904
- Leucandra carteri Dendy, 1892
- Pericharax carteri Polejaeff, 1883
- Pristurus carteri (Gray, 1863)
- Pronax carteri Dendy, 1897
- Pseudoesperia carteri Deny & Frederick, 1924
- Spongia carteri Burton, 1930
- Spongilla carteri Bowerbank, 1858
- Stellettinopsis carteri Ridley, 1884
- Sycon carteri Dendy, 1892
- Thorecta carteri Lendenfeld, 1889
- Vioa carteri Ridley, 1881
- Axinella carteri (Dendy)

== Sources ==
- Entry for Henry John Carter in the Royal Society's Library and Archive catalogue's details of Fellows (accessed 24 April 2008)
- Downes, Michael (2013) The Scientist in the Cottage : Henry John Carter FRS (1813-1895). Primrose Publications. 40pp.
