= Robert von Lendenfeld =

Austrian zoologist, alpinist and traveler

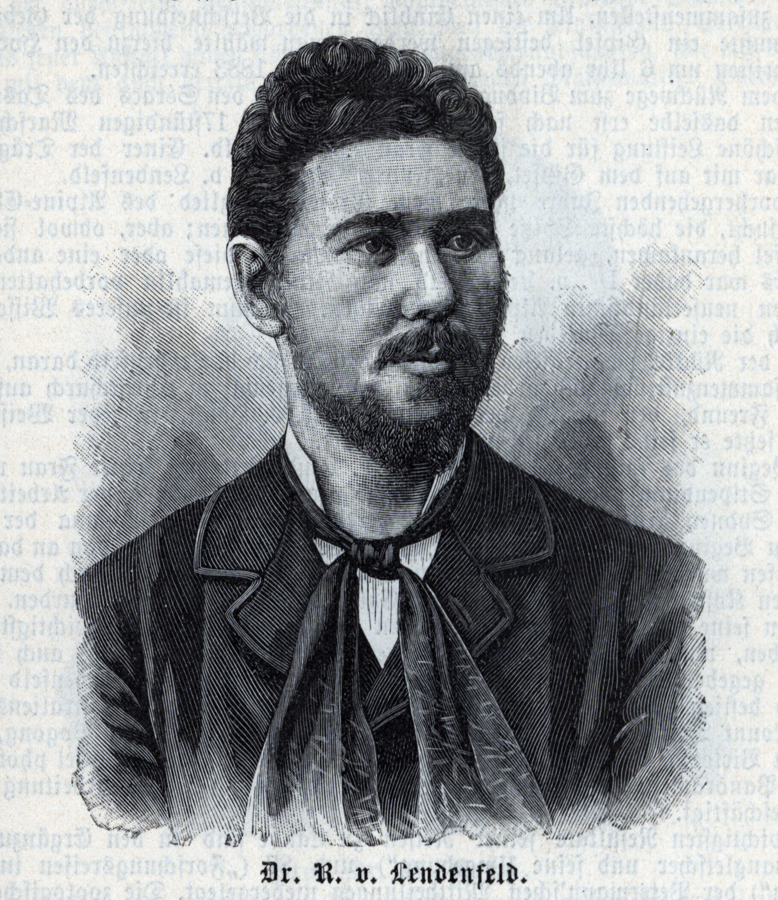
Portrait of Robert J. Lendlmayer von Lendenfeld

Robert J. Lendlmayer von Lendenfeld (1858–1913) was an Austrian zoologist, alpinist, and traveler. He was also a notable spongiologist.

von Lendenfeld was one of a number of influential German-speaking residents — such as Ludwig Becker, Hermann Beckler, William Blandowski, Amalie Dietrich, Wilhelm Haacke, Diedrich Henne, Gerard Krefft, Johann Luehmann, Johann Menge, Carl Mücke (a.k.a. Muecke), Ludwig Preiss, Carl Ludwig Christian Rümker (a.k.a. Ruemker), Moritz Richard Schomburgk, Richard Wolfgang Semon, Karl Theodor Staiger, George Ulrich, Eugene von Guérard, Ferdinand von Mueller, Georg von Neumayer, and Carl Wilhelmi — who brought their "epistemic traditions" to Australia, and not only became "deeply entangled with the Australian colonial project", but also were "intricately involved in imagining, knowing and shaping colonial Australia" (Barrett, et al., 2018, p. 2).

== Works ==
- 1886: Über Coelenteraten der Südsee
- 1888: Descriptive catalogue of the sponges in the Australian Museum, Sydney
- 1890: Australia Felix
- 1892: Australische Reise
- 1894: Der Tasman Gletscher und seine Umgebung, Gotha
- 1894: Die Tetractinelliden der Adria: (Mit einem Anhange über die Lithistiden)
- 1895: Report on the deep-sea fishes collected by H. M. S. Challenger during the years 1873-76
- 1896: Aus den Alpen
- 1896: Die Clavulina der Adria
- 1899: Wissenschaftliche Ergebnisse der Reisen in Madagaskar und Ostafrika (mit Alfred Völtzkow, Hans Schinz, Hans Strahl, Hubert Ludwig, Henri de Saussure)
- 1899: Die Hochgebirge der Erde
- 1902: Neuseeland
- 1902: Das grosse australische Wallriff
- 1903: Das Tierreich
- 1903: Porifera: Tetraxonia
- 1908: Tetraxonia der deutschen Südpolar-Expedition, 1901-1903
- 1913: Untersuchungen über die Skelettbildungen der Kieselschwämme: I. Die Mikrosklere der Caminus-Arten
