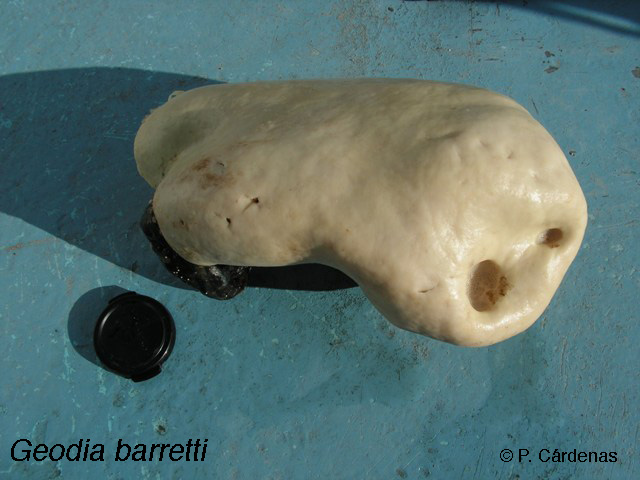
- Geodia barretti

Scientific classification
- Kingdom: Animalia
- Phylum: Porifera
- Class: Demospongiae
- Order: Tetractinellida
- Suborder: Astrophorina
- Family: Geodiidae; Gray, 1867

Subfamilies
- Geodinae Sollas, 1888; Erylinae Sollas, 1888

= Geodiidae =

Family of sponges

Geodiidae is a family of sea sponges.

== Genera ==
- Caminella Lendenfeld, 1894
- Caminus Schmidt, 1862
- Depressiogeodia Cárdenas, Rapp, Schander & Tendal, 2010 (temporary name)
- Erylus Gray, 1867
- Geodia Lamarck, 1815
- Melophlus Thiele, 1899
- Pachymatisma Bowerbank, 1864
- Penares Gray, 1867
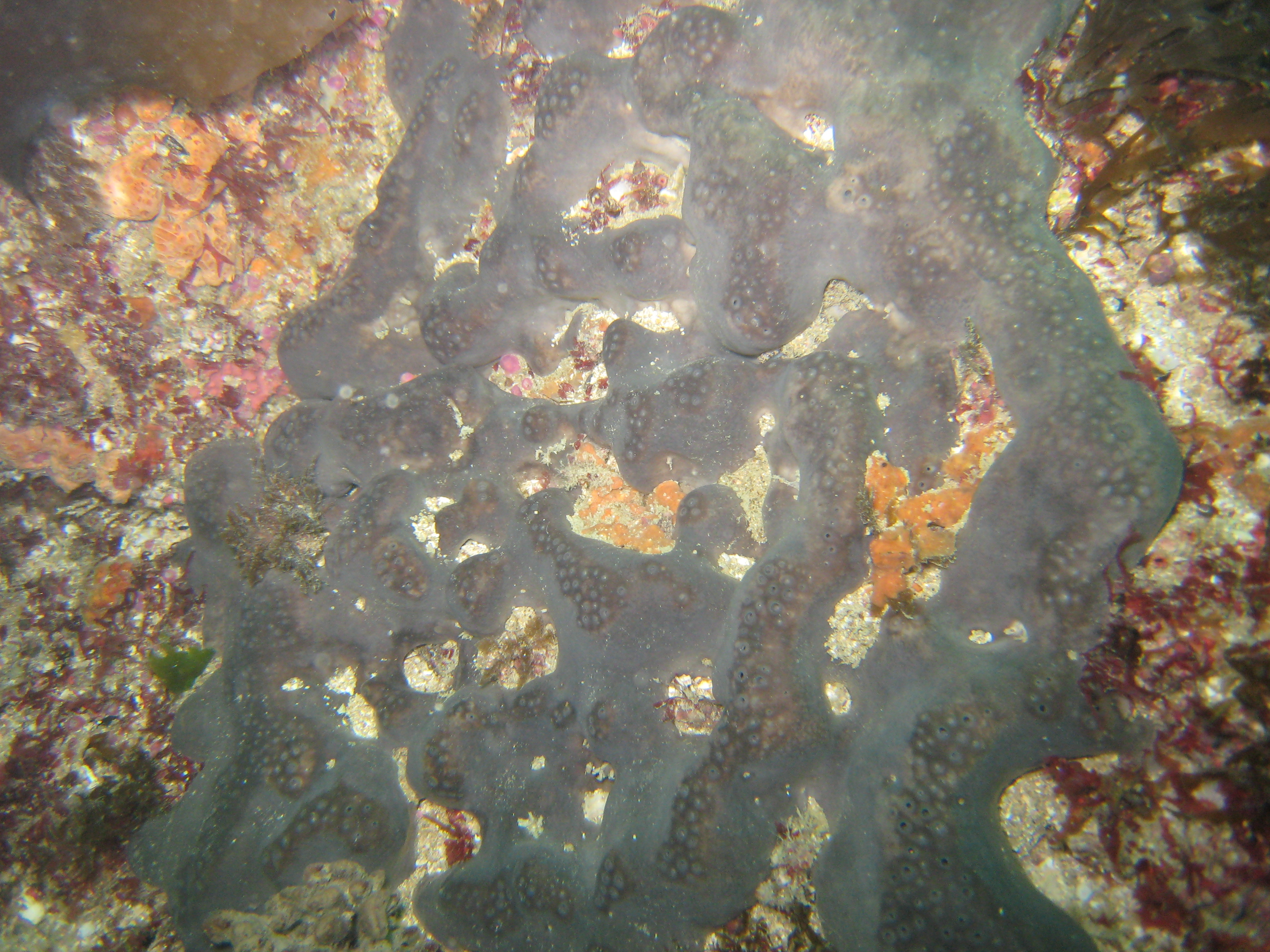
Pachymatisma johnstonia

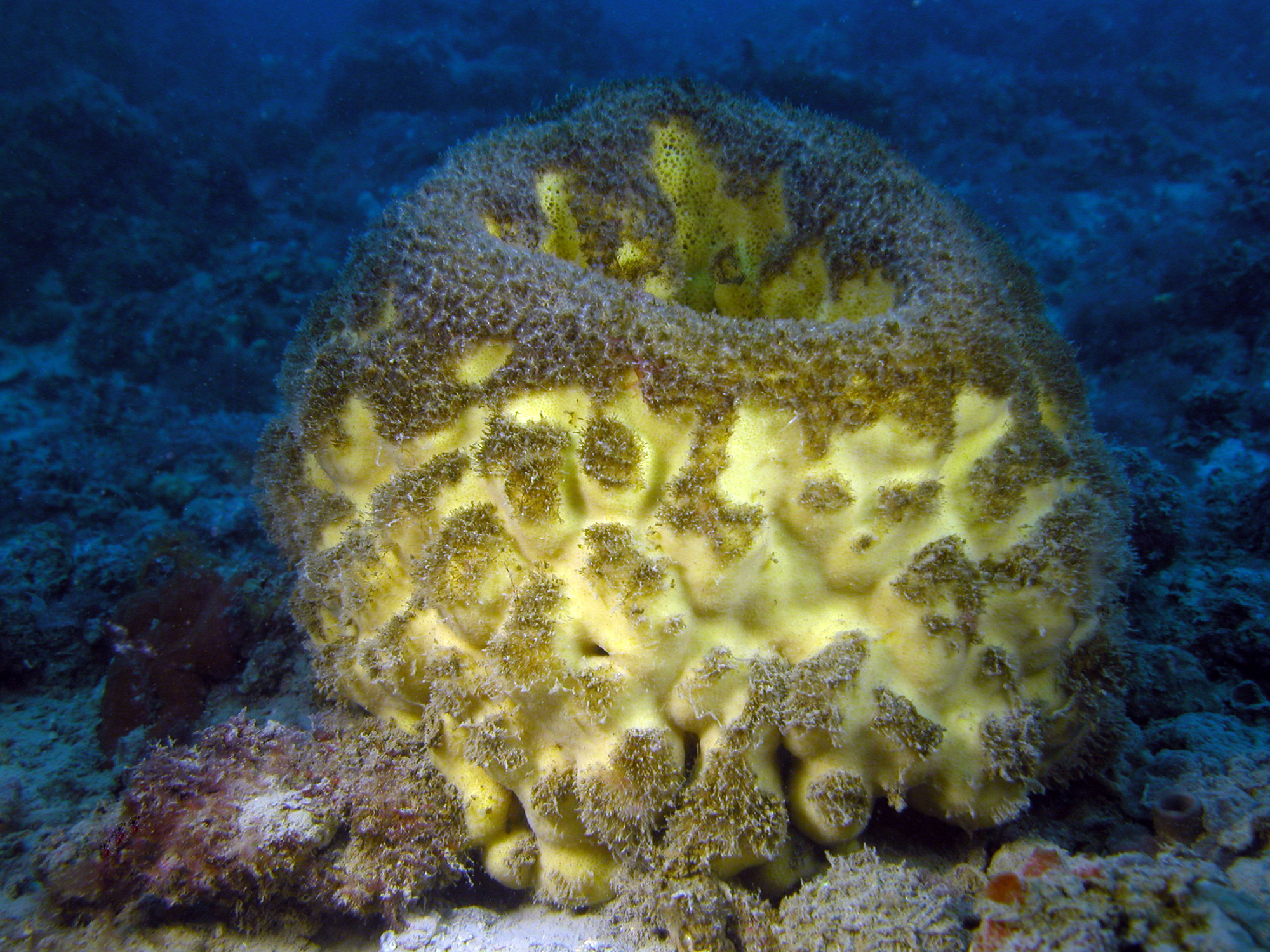
Geodia cydonium

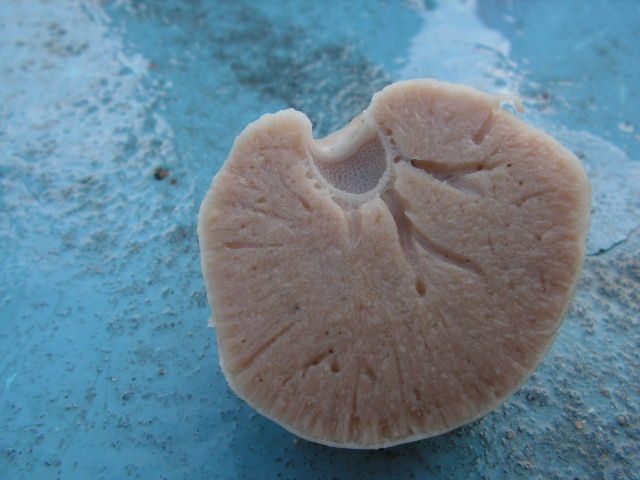
Geodia barretti
