= Stelletta kallitetilla =

Scientific classification
- Kingdom: Animalia
- Phylum: Porifera
- Class: Demospongiae
- Order: Tetractinellida
- Family: Ancorinidae
- Genus: Stelletta
- Species: S. kallitetilla

Binomial name
- Stelletta kallitetilla (de Laubenfels, 1936)

Synonyms
- Myriastra kallitetilla de Laubenfels, 1936

Species of sponge

Stelletta kallitetilla is a species of demosponge belonging to the family Ancorinidae. It is native to the tropical western Atlantic Ocean and the Caribbean Sea. It was first described in 1936 by the American zoologist Max Walker de Laubenfels as Myriastra kallitetilla but was later transferred to the genus Stelletta.

== Description ==
Stelletta kallitetilla is a massive sponge that is usually green or yellow, the colour varying from light yellowish-green to a dark shade of green. The consistency of the sponge is soft but tough, and it often has an osculum at the top. The surface is usually nodular, but may be smooth or bristly, and often has fouling organisms growing on it.

== Distribution and habitat ==
Stelletta kallitetilla is native to the tropical western Atlantic Ocean, the Caribbean Sea and the Gulf of Mexico. It grows at depths down to about 38 m (125 ft). It tends to grow in seagrass meadows and on the stilt roots of mangroves.

== Ecology ==
Stelletta kallitetilla often harbours the commensal amphipod Colomastix janiceae, as well as another amphipod, Leucothoe spinicarpa, in the tubes, holes and crevices of the sponge; in a study off southeastern Florida and the Florida Keys, all the ten individual sponges examined contained the amphipods living inside.
