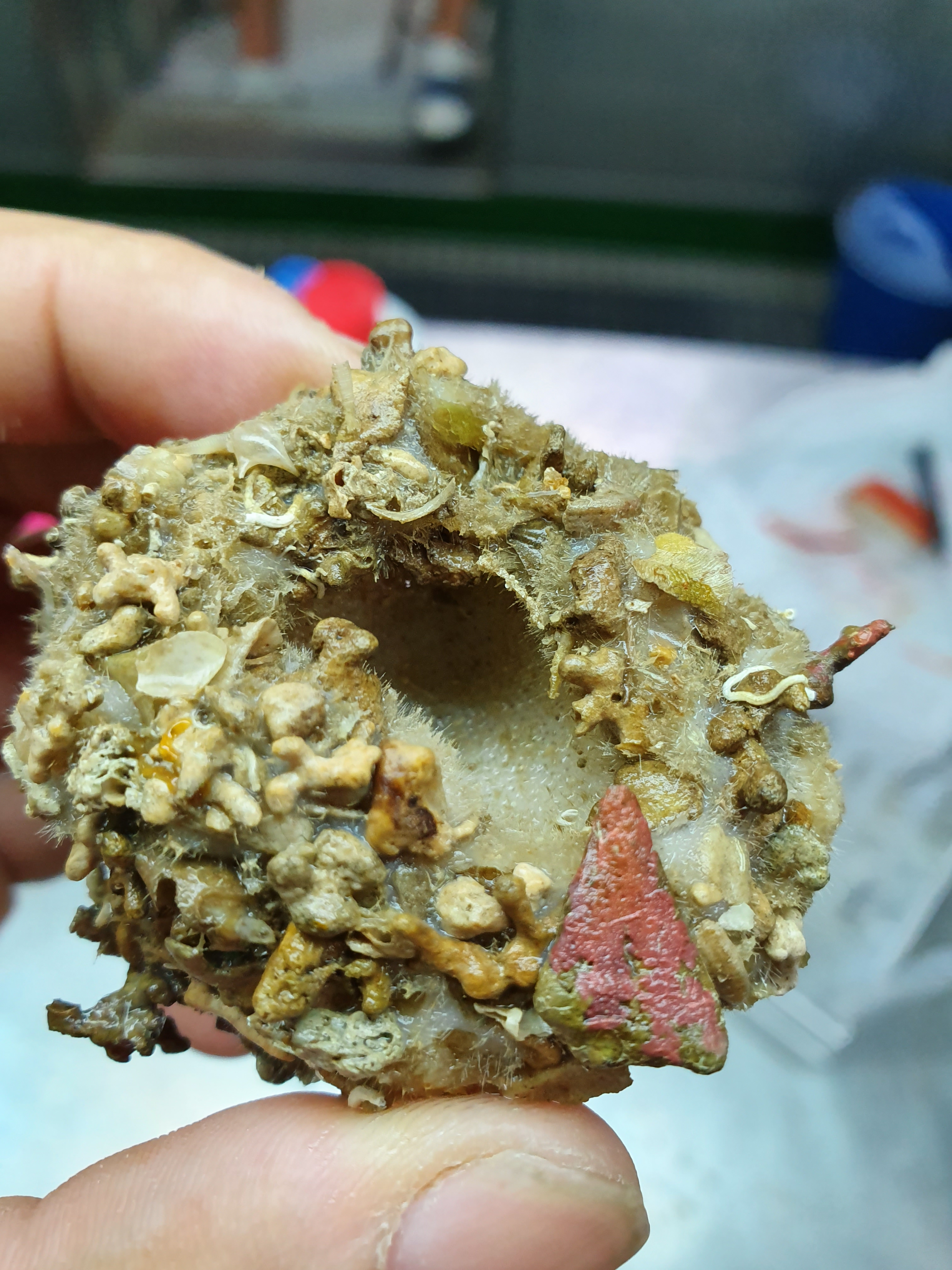

Scientific classification
- Kingdom: Animalia
- Phylum: Porifera
- Class: Demospongiae
- Order: Tetractinellida
- Family: Ancorinidae
- Genus: Stelletta
- Species: S. mortarium

Binomial name
- Stelletta mortarium Díaz & Cárdenas, 2024

= Stelletta mortarium =

Species of sponge

Stelletta mortarium is a species of sea sponge belonging to the family Ancorinidae. The species was first described by Julio Alberto Díaz and Paco Cárdenas in 2024.

== Distribution ==
Stelletta mortarium was first found in the waters around the Balearic Islands, at a depth of 150 m (492 ft).

== Bibliography ==
- Díaz, J.A., Ordines, F., Massutí, E. & Cárdenas, P. 2024. From caves to seamounts: the hidden diversity of tetractinellid sponges from the Balearic Islands, with the description of eight new species. PeerJ. doi:10.7717/peerj.16584
