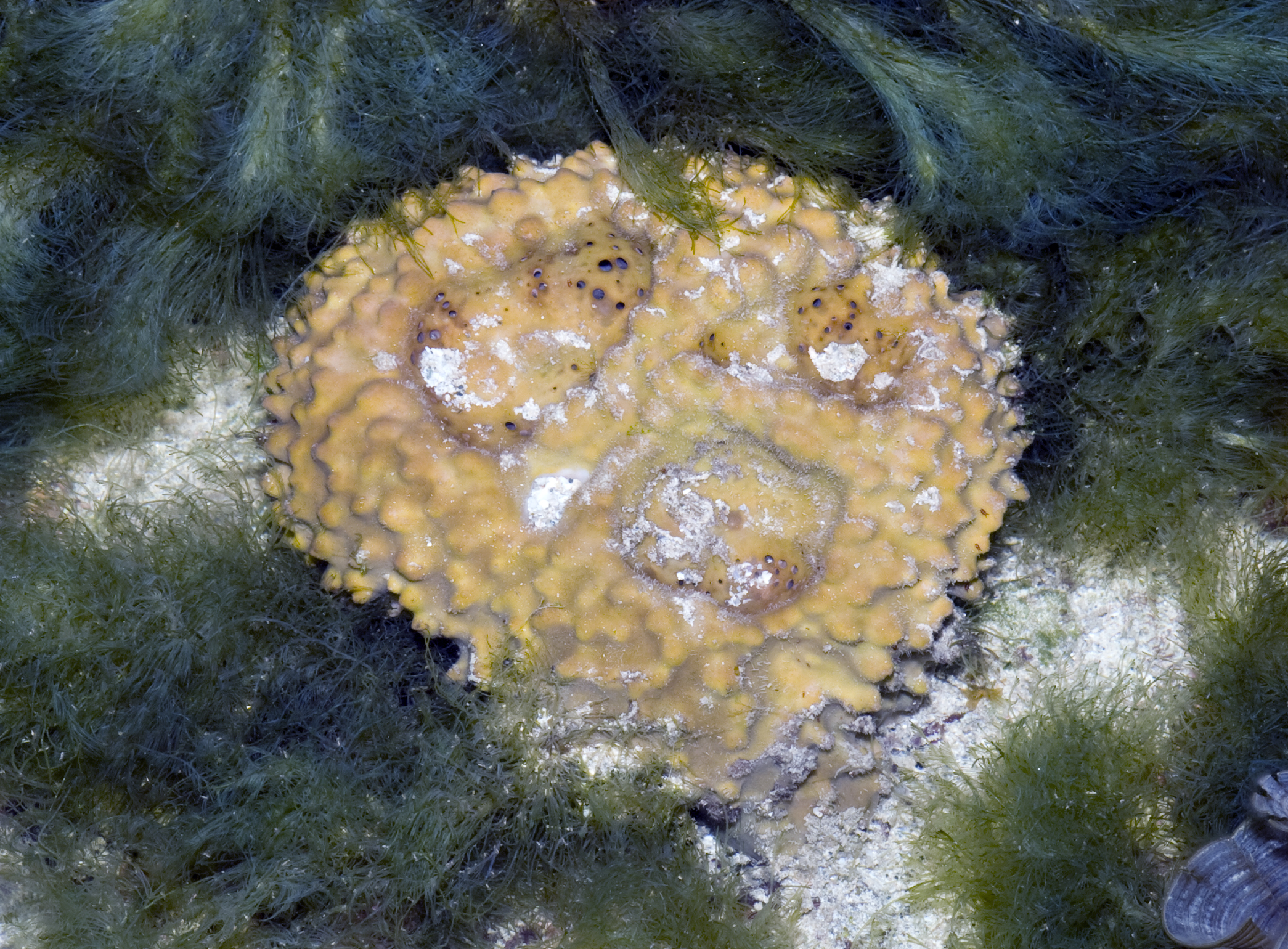

Scientific classification
- Domain: Eukaryota
- Kingdom: Animalia
- Phylum: Porifera
- Class: Demospongiae
- Order: Tetractinellida
- Family: Ancorinidae
- Genus: Rhabdastrella
- Species: R. globostellata

Binomial name
- Rhabdastrella globostellata (Carter, 1883)

Synonyms
- Amorphina stellifera Carter, 1879; Aurora globostellata Carter, 1883; Jaspis stellifera Carter, 1879; Stelletta globostellata Carter, 1883; Stellettinopsis coriacea Carter, 1886; Stellettinopsis purpurea Carter, 1886

= Rhabdastrella globostellata =

Species of sponge

Rhabdastrella globostellata, also known as the yellow pot sponge, is a marine sponge of the order Astrophorida. It is native to many regions of the Indian Ocean including the shores of Madagascar, the Seychelles, and Australia as well as the Malayan Peninsula and Singapore. It was first described by Henry J. Carter as Stelleta globostellata in 1883, named after the globostellate shape of its spicules (Latin globus meaning "sphere" and stellātus meaning "star-shaped").

R. globostellata has been shown to produce a wide variety of isomalabaricanes, a type of triterpene molecules with notable cytotoxic activity towards certain cancer cell lines.
