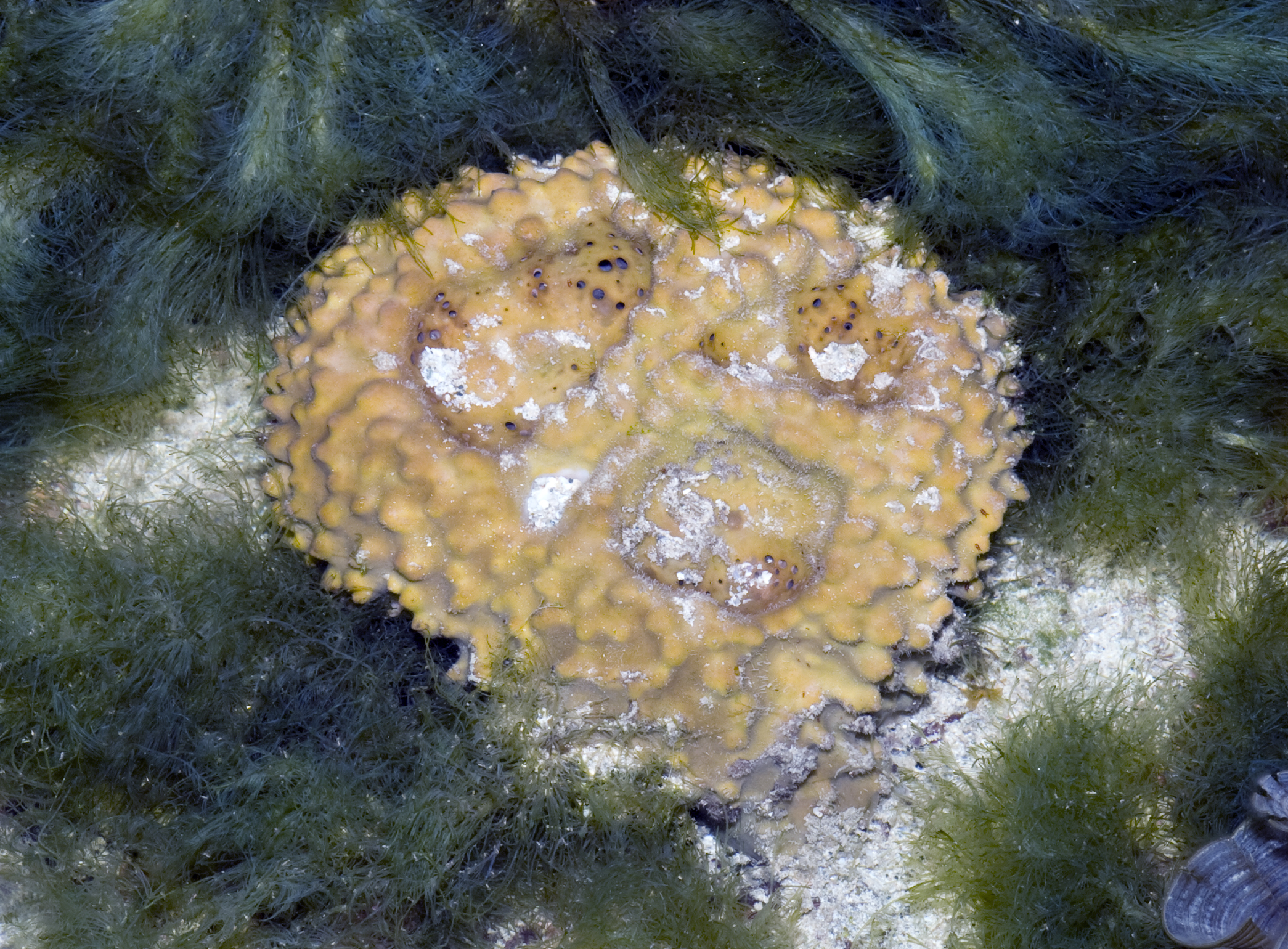
- Rhabdastrella globostellata

Scientific classification
- Kingdom: Animalia
- Phylum: Porifera
- Class: Demospongiae
- Order: Tetractinellida
- Family: Ancorinidae
- Genus: Rhabdastrella; Thiele, 1903

Species
- See text

Synonyms
- Aurora Sollas, 1888; Diastra Row, 1911

= Rhabdastrella =

Genus of sponges

Rhabdastrella is a genus of marine sponges belonging to the family of Ancorinidae.

== Species ==
- Rhabdastrella actinosa (Lévi, 1964)
- Rhabdastrella aurora (Hentschel, 1909)
- Rhabdastrella cordata Wiedenmayer, 1989
- Rhabdastrella cribriporosa (Dendy, 1916)
- Rhabdastrella distincta (Thiele, 1900)
- Rhabdastrella fibrosa Hechtel, 1983
- Rhabdastrella globostellata (Carter, 1883)
- Rhabdastrella intermedia Wiedenmayer, 1989
- Rhabdastrella membranacea (Hentschel, 1909)
- Rhabdastrella oxytoxa (Thomas, 1973)
- Rhabdastrella primitiva (Burton, 1926)
- Rhabdastrella providentiae (Dendy, 1916)
- Rhabdastrella reticulata (Carter, 1883)
- Rhabdastrella rowi (Dendy, 1916)
- Rhabdastrella spinosa (Lévi, 1967)
- Rhabdastrella sterrastraea (Row, 1911)
- Rhabdastrella trichophora (Lévi e Lévi, 1989)
- Rhabdastrella virgula Boury-Esnault, 1973
- Rhabdastrella wondoensis (Sim & Kim, 1995)
