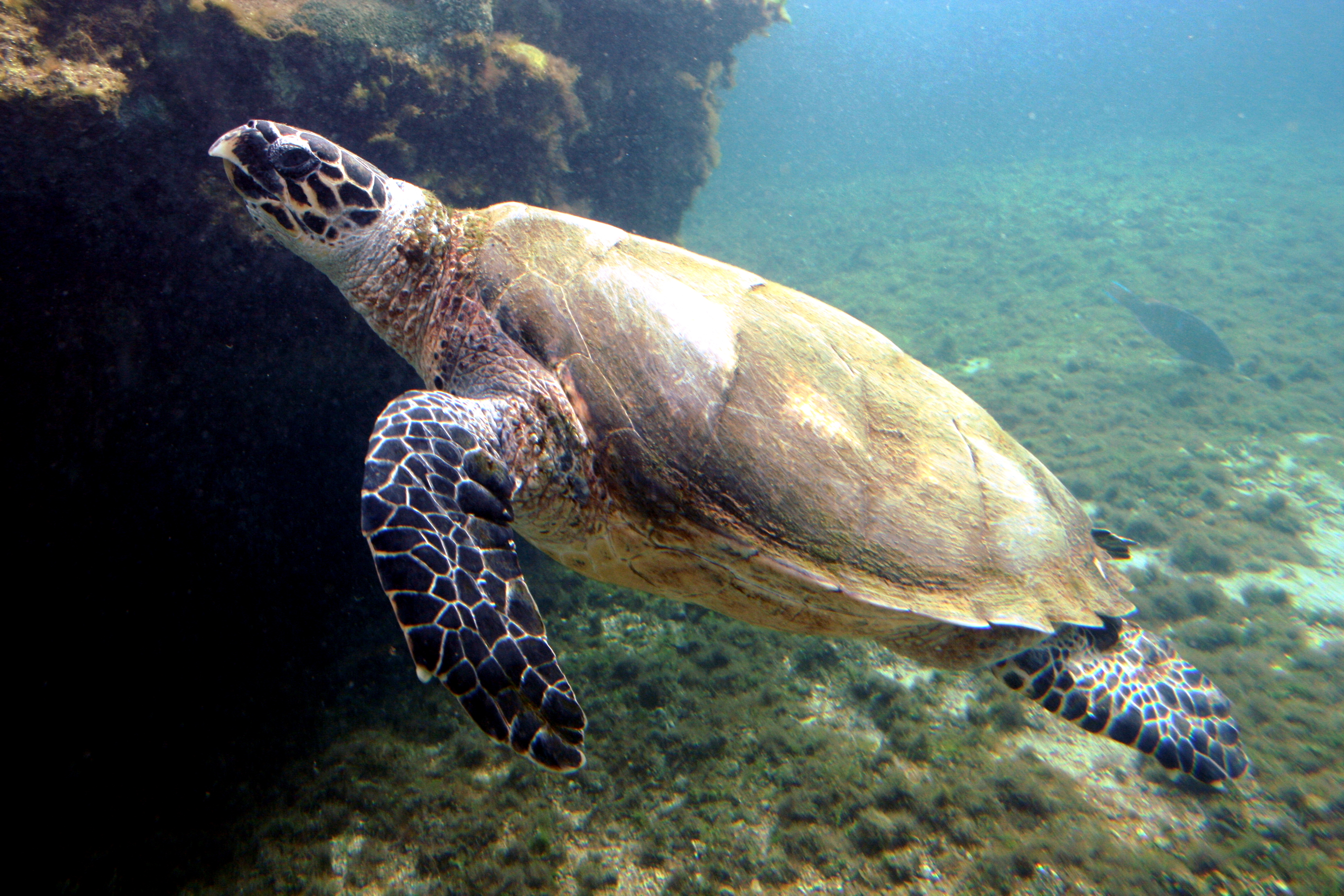

Conservation status
- Critically Endangered (IUCN 3.1)
- CITES Appendix I

Scientific classification
- Kingdom: Animalia
- Phylum: Chordata
- Class: Reptilia
- Order: Testudines
- Suborder: Cryptodira
- Family: Cheloniidae
- Subfamily: Cheloniinae
- Genus: Eretmochelys; Fitzinger, 1843
- Species: E. imbricata

Binomial name
- Eretmochelys imbricata (Linnaeus, 1766)
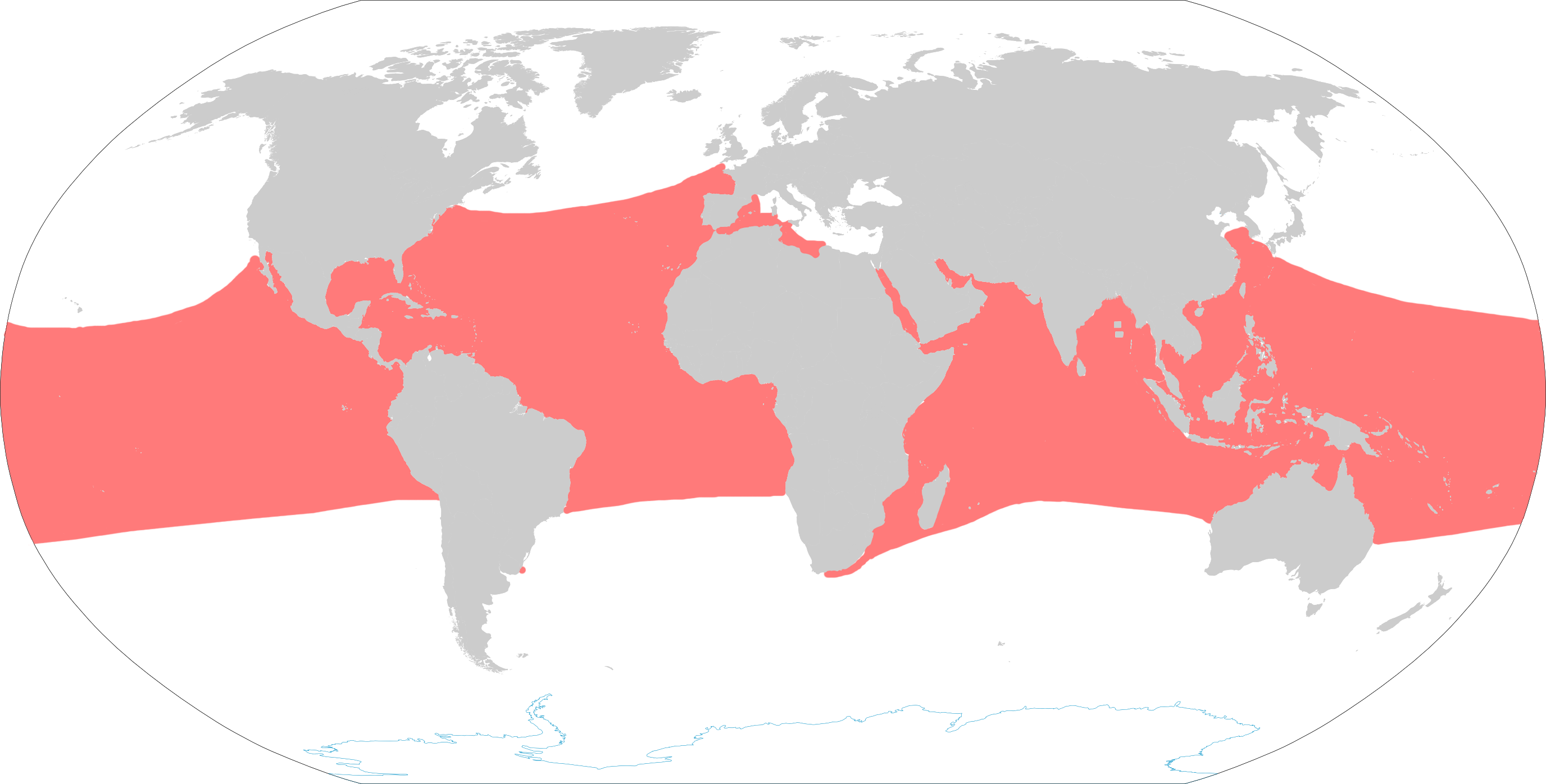
- Expert range map of the hawksbill sea turtle

Synonyms
- Testudo imbricata Linnaeus, 1766; E. imbricata squamata junior synonym

= Hawksbill sea turtle =

Species of reptile

The hawksbill sea turtle (Eretmochelys imbricata) is a critically endangered sea turtle belonging to the family Cheloniidae. It is the only extant species in the genus Eretmochelys. The species has a global distribution that is largely limited to tropical and subtropical marine and estuary ecosystems.

The appearance of the hawksbill is similar to that of other sea turtles. In general, it has a flattened body shape, a protective carapace, and flipper-like limbs, adapted for swimming in the open ocean. E. imbricata is easily distinguished from other sea turtles by its sharp, curving beak with prominent tomium, and the saw-like appearance of its shell margins. Hawksbill shells slightly change colors, depending on water temperature. While this turtle lives part of its life in the open ocean, it spends more time in shallow lagoons and coral reefs.

The World Conservation Union classifies E. imbricata as critically endangered, primarily as a result of human fishing practices. Hawksbill shells were the primary source of tortoiseshell material used for decorative purposes. The Convention on International Trade in Endangered Species regulates the international trade of hawksbill sea turtles and products derived from them.

== Taxonomy ==
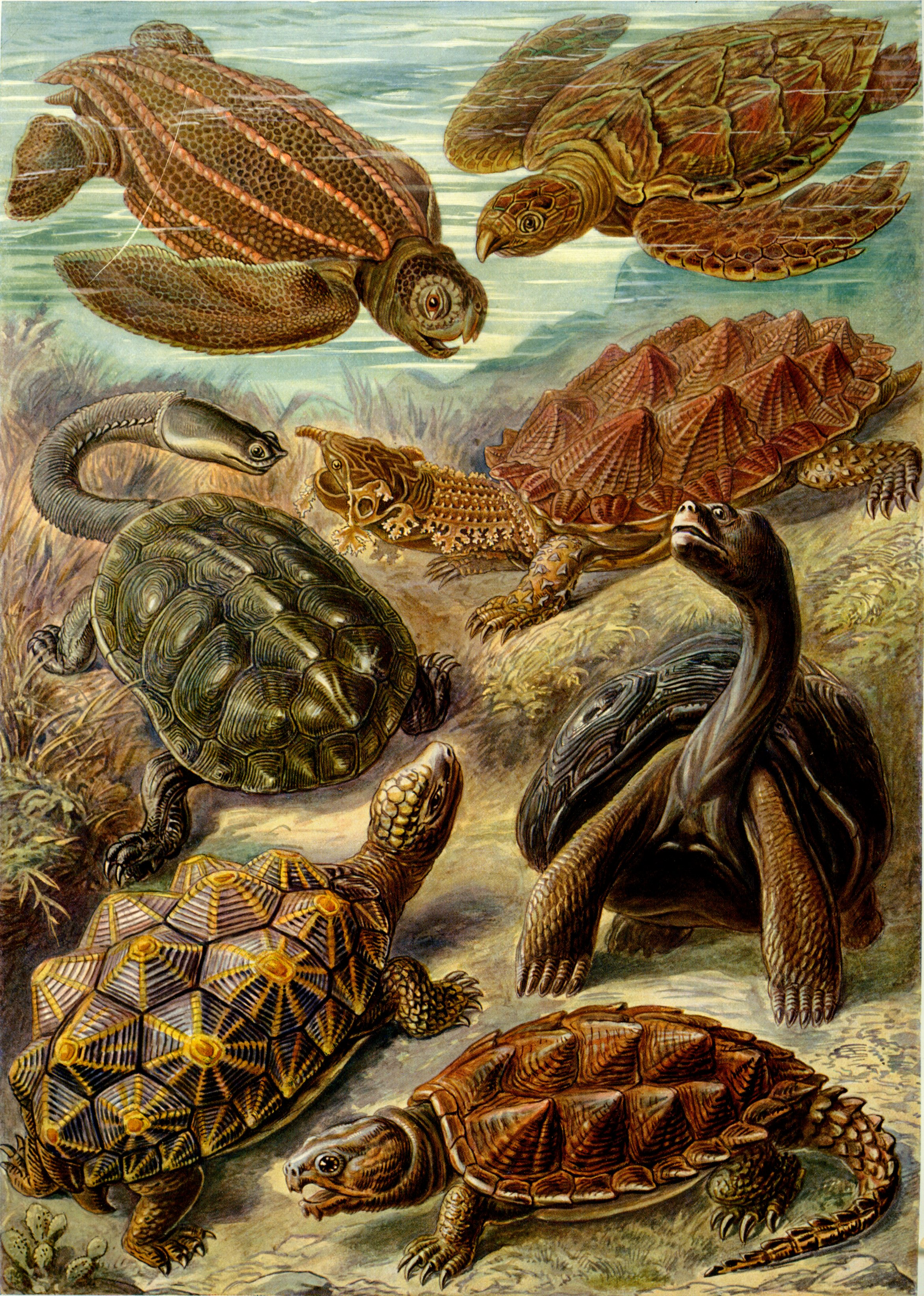
Hawksbill sea turtle (top right) in a 1904 plate by Ernst Haeckel

Linnaeus described the hawksbill sea turtle as Testudo imbricata in 1766, in the 12th edition of his Systema Naturae. In 1843, Austrian zoologist Leopold Fitzinger moved it into the genus Eretmochelys. In 1857, the species was temporarily misdescribed as Eretmochelys imbricata squamata.

Neither the IUCN nor the United States Endangered Species Act assessment processes recognize any formal subspecies, but instead recognize one globally distributed species with populations, subpopulations, or regional management units.

=== Etymology ===
Fitzinger derived the genus name Eretmochelys from the Ancient Greek roots eretmo and chelys, corresponding to "oar" and "turtle", respectively, in reference to the turtles' oar-like front flippers. The species name imbricata is Latin, corresponding to the English term imbricate, in reference to the turtles' shingle-like, overlapping carapace scutes.

=== Evolution ===
Within the sea turtles, E. imbricata has several unique anatomical and ecological traits. It is the only primarily spongivorous reptile. Because of this, its evolutionary position is somewhat unclear. Molecular analyses support Eretmochelys placement within the taxonomic tribe Carettini, including the carnivorous loggerhead and ridley sea turtles, rather than in the tribe Chelonini, which includes the herbivorous green turtle. The hawksbill probably evolved from carnivorous ancestors.

== Description ==
Head closeup

Adult hawksbill sea turtles typically grow to 1 m (3 ft) in length, weighing around 80 kg (180 lb) on average. The heaviest hawksbill ever captured weighed 127 kg (280 lb). The turtle's shell, or carapace, has an amber background patterned with an irregular combination of light and dark streaks, with predominantly black and mottled-brown colors radiating to the sides.

Several characteristics of the hawksbill sea turtle distinguish it from other sea turtle species. Its elongated, tapered head ends in a beak-like mouth (from which its common name is derived), and its beak is more sharply pronounced and hooked than others. The hawksbill's forelimbs have two visible claws on each flipper.

Hatchlings, in Venezuela

A readily distinguished characteristic of the hawksbill is the pattern of thick scutes that make up its carapace. While its carapace has five central scutes and four pairs of lateral scutes like several members of its family, E. imbricata's posterior scutes overlap in such a way as to give the rear margin of its carapace a serrated look, similar to the edge of a saw or a steak knife. The turtle's carapace can reach almost 1 m (3 ft) in length. The hawksbill appears to frequently employ its sturdy shell to insert its body into tight spaces in reefs.

Crawling with an alternating gait, hawksbill tracks left in the sand are asymmetrical. In contrast, the green sea turtle and the leatherback turtle have a more symmetrical gait.

Due to its consumption of venomous cnidarians, hawksbill sea turtle flesh can become toxic.

The hawksbill is biofluorescent and is the first reptile recorded with this characteristic. If the effect is due to the turtle's diet, which includes biofluorescent organisms like the hard coral Physogyra lichtensteini, is unknown. Males have more intense pigmentation than females, and a behavioral role of these differences is speculated.

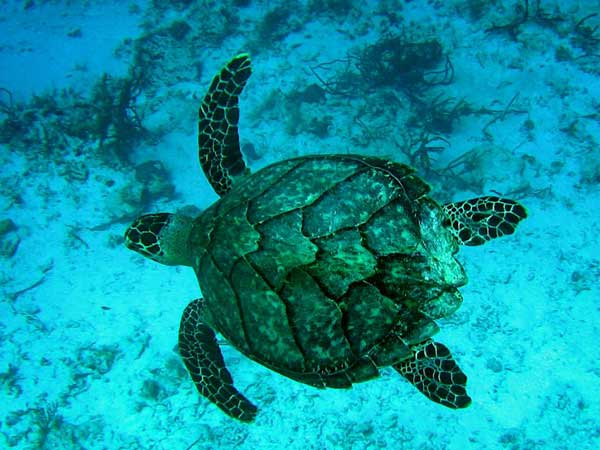
Carapace has serrated margin and overlapping scutes

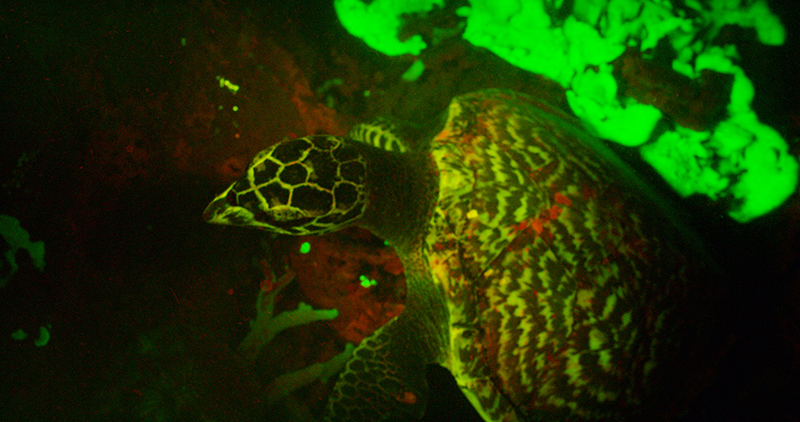
Fluorescent markings on carapace

Swimming past a group of divers on the Great Barrier Reef, Australia

Showing the plastron

== Distribution ==
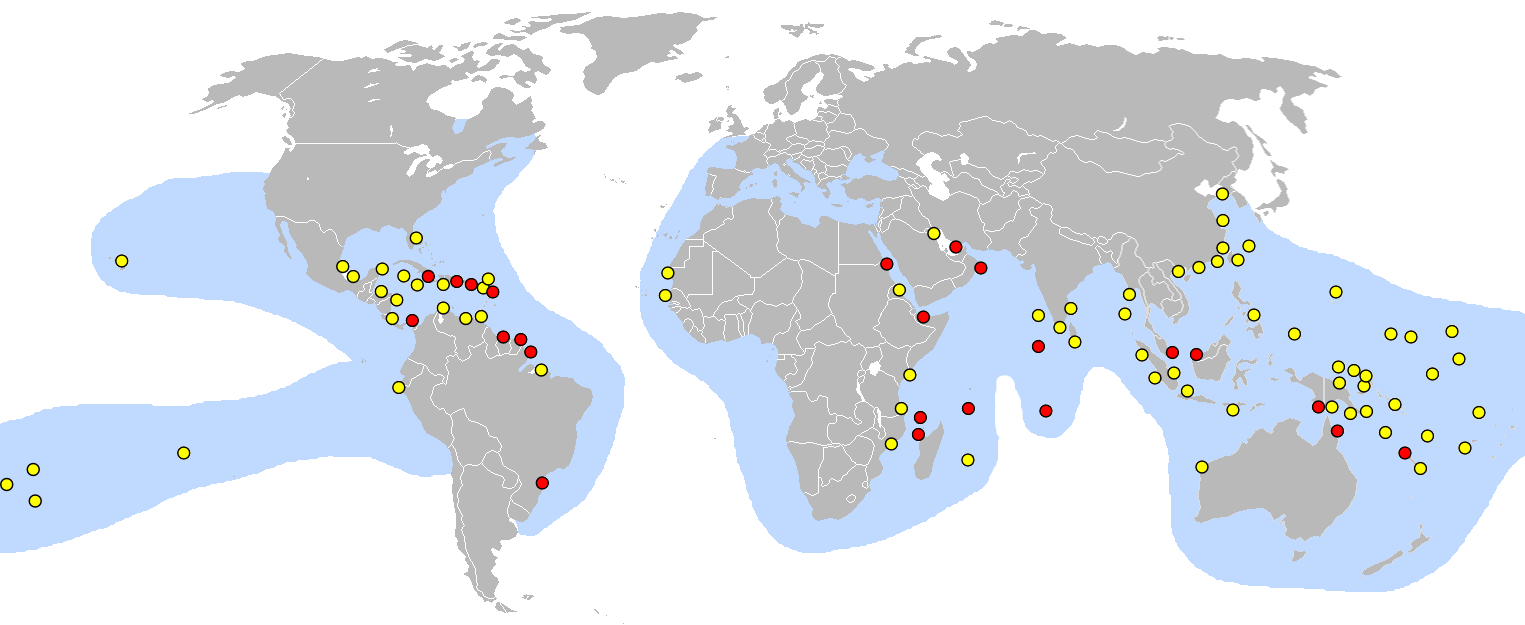
Another model of the possible distribution of E. imbricata: Red circles represent known major nesting sites. Yellow circles are minor nesting sites.

Hawksbill sea turtles have a wide range, found predominantly in tropical reefs of the Indian, Pacific, and Atlantic Oceans. Of all the sea turtle species, E. imbricata is the one most associated with warm, tropical waters. Two significant subpopulations are known, in the Atlantic and Indo-Pacific.

=== Atlantic subpopulation ===
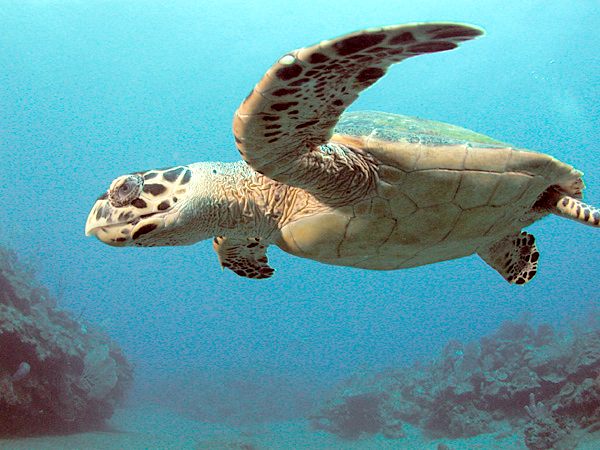
In Saba, Netherlands Antilles

In the Atlantic, hawksbill populations range as far west as the Gulf of Mexico and as far southeast as the Cape of Good Hope in South Africa. They live off the Brazilian coast (specifically Bahia, Fernando de Noronha).

Along the East Coast of the United States, hawksbill sea turtles range from Virginia to Florida. In Florida, according to the Florida Fish and Wildlife Conservation Commission, hawksbills are found primarily on reefs in the Florida Keys and along the southeastern Atlantic coast. Several major nesting sites are found in coastal Palm Beach, Broward, and Dade Counties. The Florida Hawksbill Project is a comprehensive research and conservation program to study and protect the region's hawksbill sea turtles and the habitats in which they live. Within the scope of this project, numerous studies have been undertaken to characterize the hawksbill aggregations found in southeast Florida waters, and educational programs have been developed to engage the local dive community in the protection of hawksbill sea turtles and coral reef habitats. This program is hosted by the National Save the Sea Turtle Foundation, located in Fort Lauderdale, Florida. Throughout their global range, hawksbill turtles are known to closely associate with coral reef habitats, mostly due to their preference for eating sponges and corals. Due to the large extent of Florida's barrier reefs (about 350 linear miles), the Hawksbill Project focuses on representative sites in the northern, central, and southern sections of the Southeast Florida Reef Tract. The barrier reefs of northern Palm Beach County, the patch reefs of the northern Keys, and the finger reefs of Key West are the primary locations for their sampling efforts

In the Caribbean, the main nesting beaches are in the Lesser Antilles, Barbados, Guadeloupe, Tortuguero in Costa Rica, and the Yucatan. They feed in the waters off Cuba and around Mona Island near Puerto Rico, among other places.

=== Indo-Pacific subpopulation ===
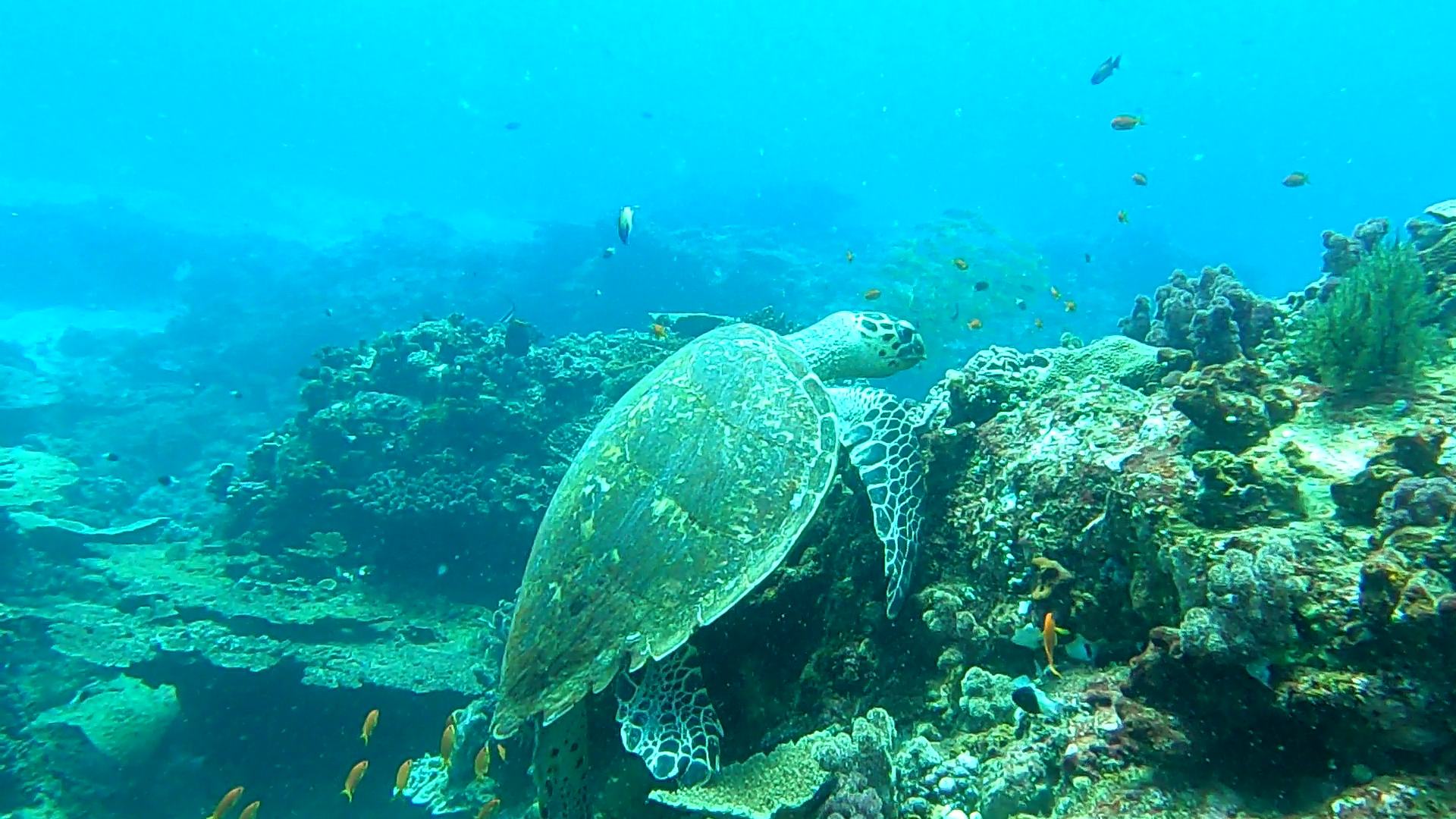
Foraging on the reefs at Ilha do Fogo, Mozambique

In the Indian Ocean, hawksbills are a common sight along the east coast of Africa. One can find them in the seas surrounding Madagascar and Mozambique, and island groups such as Primeiras e Segundas, which include the turtle protection island of Ilha do Fogo. Hawksbills are also common along the southern Asian coast, including the Persian Gulf, the Red Sea, and the Indian subcontinental and Southeast Asian coasts. They are present across the Malay Archipelago and northern Australia. Their Pacific range is limited to the ocean's tropical and subtropical regions. In the west, it extends from the southwestern tips of the Korean Peninsula and the Japanese archipelago south to northern New Zealand.

The Philippines hosts several nesting sites, including the island of Boracay and Punta Dumalag in Davao City. Dahican Beach in Mati City, Davao Oriental, hosts one of the essential hatcheries of its kind, along with olive ridley sea turtles in the archipelagic country of the Philippines. A small group of islands in the southwest of the archipelago is named the "Turtle Islands" because two species of sea turtles nest there: the hawksbill and the green sea turtle. In January 2016, a juvenile was seen in Gulf of Thailand. A 2018 article by The Straits Times reported that around 120 hawksbill juvenile turtles recently hatched at Pulau Satumu, Singapore. Commonly found in Singapore waters, hawksbill turtles have returned to areas such East Coast Park and Palau Satumu to nest. In Hawaii, hawksbills mostly nest on the "main" islands of Oahu, Maui, Molokai, and Hawaii. In Australia, hawksbills are known to nest on Milman Island in the Great Barrier Reef. Hawksbill sea turtles nest as far west as Cousine Island in the Seychelles, where the species since 1994 is legally protected, and the population is showing some recovery. The Seychelles' inner islands and islets, such as Aldabra, are popular feeding grounds for immature hawksbills.

=== Eastern Pacific subpopulation ===
In the eastern Pacific, hawksbills are known to occur from the Baja Peninsula in Mexico, south along the coast to southern Peru. Nonetheless, as recently as 2007, the species had been considered extirpated mainly in the region. Important remnant nesting and foraging sites have since been discovered in Mexico, El Salvador, Nicaragua, and Ecuador, providing new research and conservation opportunities. In contrast to their traditional roles in other parts of the world, where hawksbills primarily inhabit coral reefs and rocky substrate areas, in the eastern Pacific, hawksbills tend to forage and nest principally in mangrove estuaries, such as those present in the Bahia de Jiquilisco (El Salvador), Gulf of Fonseca (Nicaragua, El Salvador, and Honduras), Estero Padre Ramos (Nicaragua), and the Gulf of Guayaquil (Ecuador). Multi-national initiatives, such as the Eastern Pacific Hawksbill Initiative, are currently pushing efforts to research and conserve the population, which remains poorly understood.

== Ecology ==
=== Habitat ===
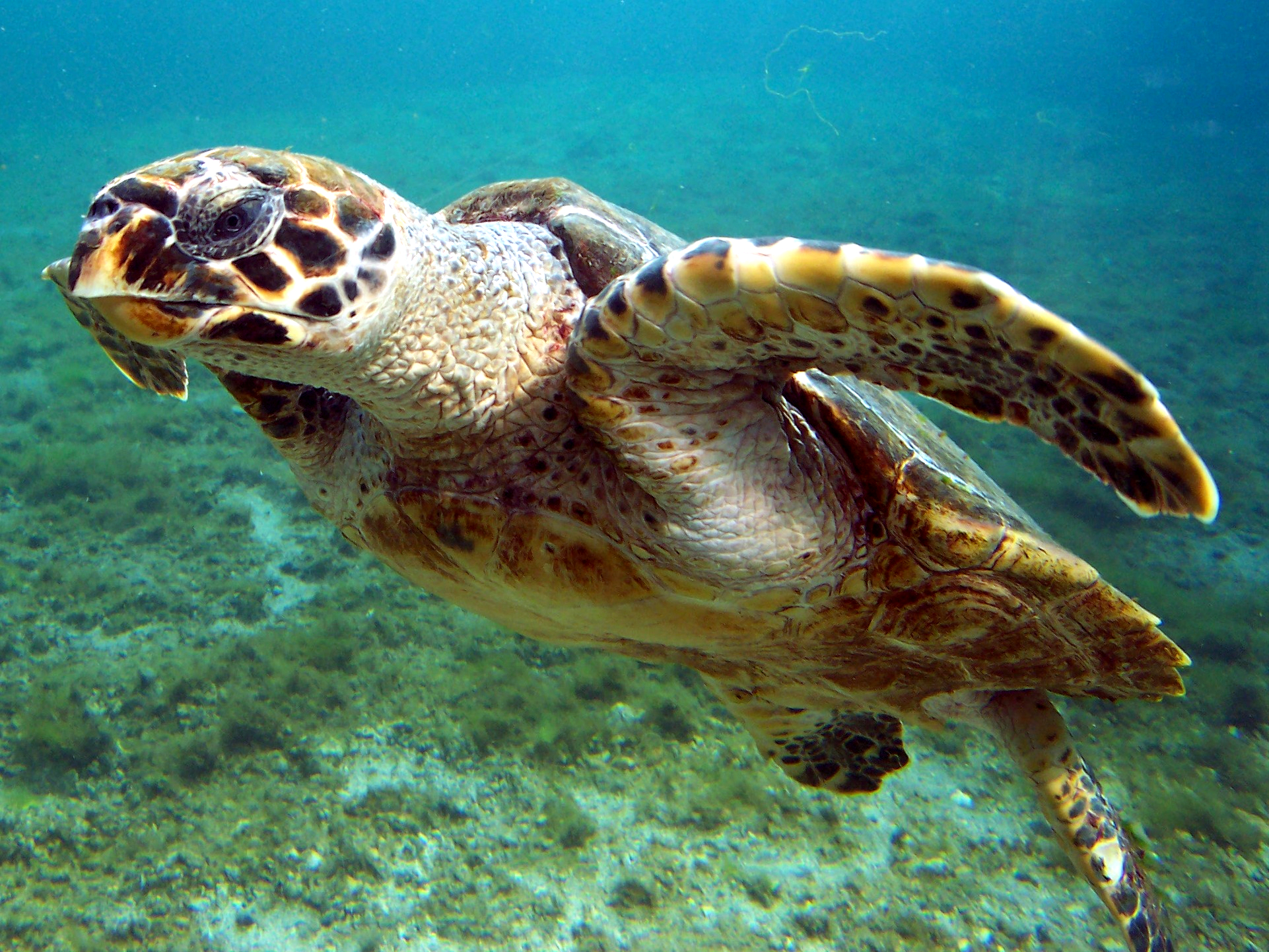
Young E. imbricata from Réunion Island

Adult hawksbill sea turtles are primarily found in tropical coral reefs. They are usually seen resting in caves and ledges in and around these reefs throughout the day. As a highly migratory species, they inhabit a wide range of habitats, from the open ocean to lagoons and even mangrove swamps in estuaries. Little is known about the habitat preferences of early life-stage E. imbricata; like other young sea turtles, they are assumed to be completely pelagic, remaining at sea until they mature. However, they have been known to seek habitats where they are able to camouflage or hide to minimize predator detection.

=== Feeding ===
Feeding, in the Red Sea

While they are omnivorous, sea sponges, their principal food, constitute 70–95% of the turtles' diet. However, like many spongivores, they feed only on select species, ignoring many others. Caribbean populations feed primarily on the orders Astrophorida, Spirophorida, and Hadromerida in the class Demospongiae. Aside from sponges, hawksbills feed on algae, marine plants (seagrasses), woody plant remains, mangrove fruits and seeds, cnidarians (jellyfish, hydrozoans, hard corals, corallimorphs, zoanthids, and sea anemones), comb jellies, bryozoans, mollusks (squid, snails, nudibranchs, bivalves, and tusk shells), echinoderms (sea cucumbers and sea urchins), tunicates, fish and their eggs, crustaceans, and arthropods (crabs, lobsters, barnacles, copepods, and beetles). They also feed on the dangerous jellyfish-like hydrozoan, the Portuguese man o' war (Physalia physalis). Hawksbills close their unprotected eyes when they feed on these cnidarians. The man o' war's stinging cells cannot penetrate the turtles' armored heads.

Hawksbills are highly resilient and resistant to their prey. Some of the sponges they eat, such as Aaptos aaptos, Chondrilla nucula, Tethya actinia, Spheciospongia vesparium, and Suberites domuncula, are highly (often lethally) toxic to other organisms. In addition, hawksbills choose sponge species with significant numbers of siliceous spicules, such as Ancorina, Geodia (G. gibberosa), Ecionemia, and Placospongia.

== Life history ==
Nesting

Less is known about the life history of hawksbills compared to several other sea turtle species. Their life history may be divided into three phases, the early phase from around 4 to 30 cm straight carapace length, the benthic phase when the immature turtles recruit to foraging areas, and the reproductive phase, when individuals reach sexual maturity and begin periodically migrating to breeding grounds. The early life history phase is not as geographically resolved as other sea turtle species. This phase appears to vary across ocean regions and may occur in both pelagic and nearshore waters, possibly lasting from 0–4 years of age. One study from the central Pacific Ocean population used bomb radiocarbon (^{14}C) dating and von Bertalanffy growth models to estimate hawksbills reach sexual maturity around 72 cm and 29 years of age (range 23–36 years). Hawksbills show a degree of fidelity after recruiting to the benthic phase however, the movement to other similar habitats is possible.

=== Breeding ===
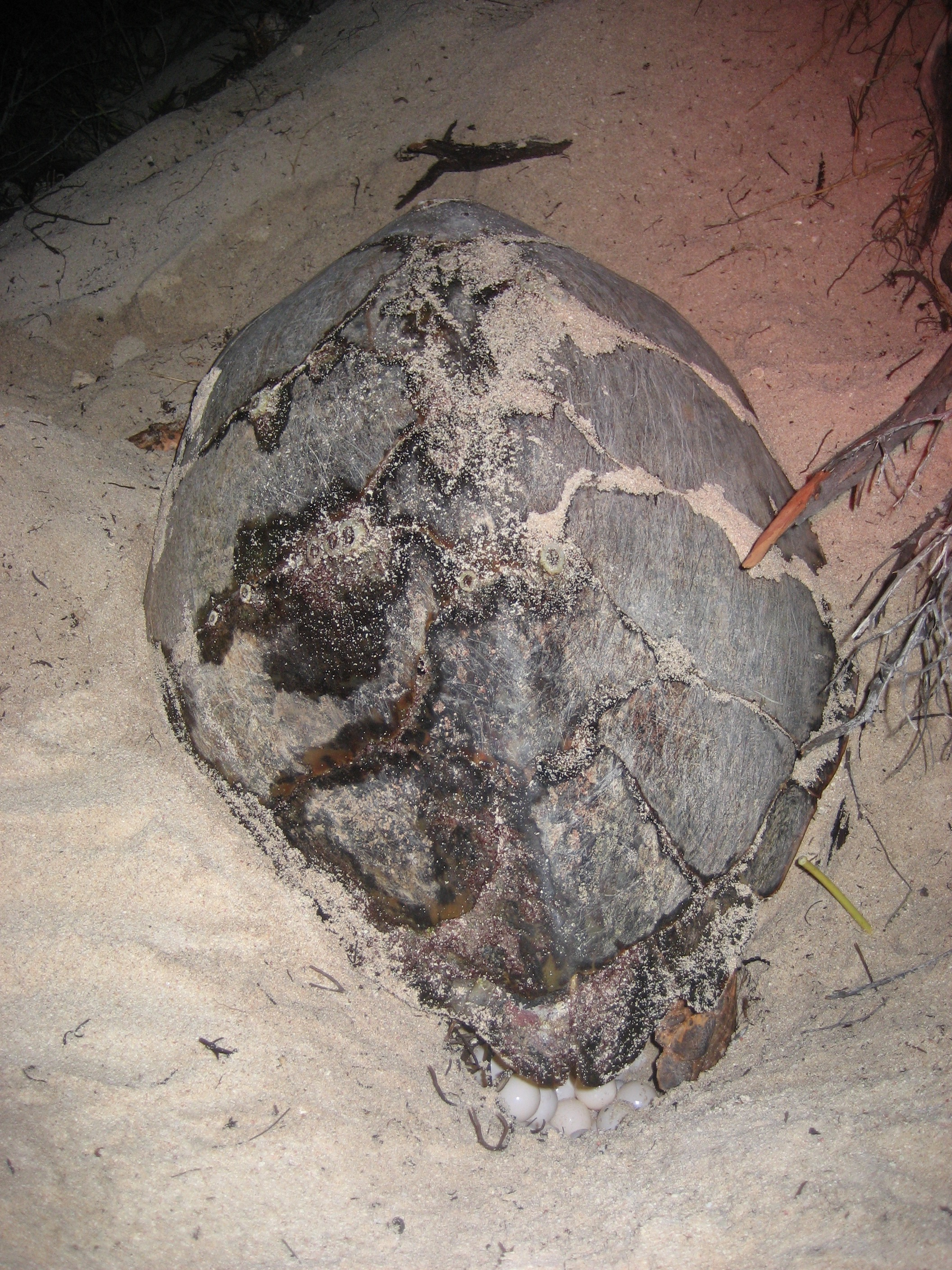
Female laying eggs, at Mona island, Puerto Rico

Hawksbills mate biannually in secluded lagoons off their nesting beaches in remote islands throughout their range. The most significant nesting beaches are in Mexico, the Seychelles, Indonesia, Sri Lanka, and Australia. The mating season for Atlantic hawksbills usually spans April to November. Indian Ocean populations, such as the Seychelles hawksbill population, mate from September to February. After mating, females drag their heavy bodies high onto the beach during the night. They clear an area of debris and dig a nesting hole using their rear flippers, then lay clutches of eggs and cover them with sand. Caribbean and Florida nests of E. imbricata typically contain around 140 eggs, which hatch after about 60 days. After the hours-long process, the female returns to the sea. Their nests can be found throughout beaches in about 60 countries.

Hatchlings, usually weighing less than 24 g (0.85 oz), hatch at night after around two months. These newly emergent hatchlings are dark-colored, with heart-shaped carapaces measuring about 2.5 cm (0.98 in) long. They instinctively crawl into the sea, attracted by the moon's reflection on the water (disrupted by light sources such as streetlamps and lights). While they emerge under the cover of darkness, hatchlings that do not reach the water by daybreak are preyed upon by shorebirds, shore crabs, and other predators.

=== Maturity ===
Adult males have much longer tails. In Cuba.

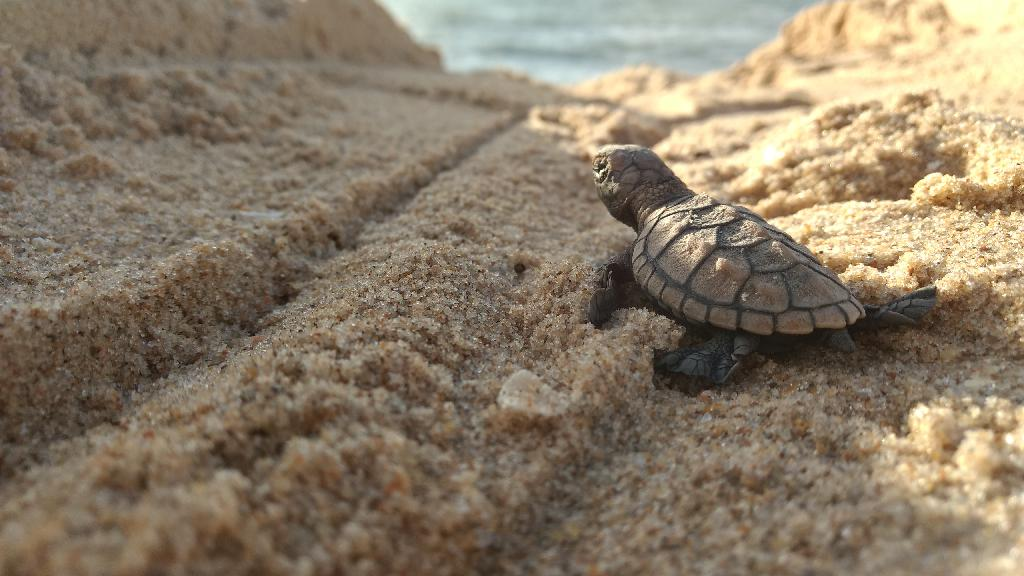
Hatchling in Paulista, Pernambuco, Brazil

Hawksbills evidently reach maturity after 20 years. Their lifespan is unknown. Like other sea turtles, hawksbills are solitary for most of their lives; they meet only to mate. They are highly migratory. Because of their tough carapaces, adults' only predators are humans, tiger sharks, requiem sharks (Carcharhinus), estuarine crocodiles, common octopuses, and groupers (Epinephelus).

A series of biotic and abiotic cues, such as individual genetics, foraging quantity and quality, or population density, may trigger the maturation of the reproductive organs and the production of gametes and thus determine sexual maturity. Like many reptiles, all marine turtles of the same aggregation are highly unlikely to reach sexual maturity at the same size and thus age.

Age at maturity has been estimated to occur between 10 and 25 years of age for Caribbean hawksbills. Turtles nesting in the Indo-Pacific region may reach maturity at a minimum of 30 to 35 years.

== Exploitation by humans ==
Throughout the world, hawksbill turtles have been hunted by humans, though it is illegal to capture, kill, and trade hawksbills in many countries today. In some parts of the world, hawksbill turtles and their eggs continue to be exploited as food. As far back as the fifth century BCE, sea turtles, including the hawksbill, were eaten as delicacies in China.

Beyond direct consumption for food, many cultures have also exploited hawksbill populations for their ornate carapace shells, known variously as tortoiseshell, turtle shell, and bekko.

In China, the hawksbill is called dai mei or dai mao ("tortoise-shell turtle"), and was used to make and decorate a variety of small items, as it was in the West. Along the south coast of Java, stuffed hawksbill turtles are sold in souvenir shops, though numbers have decreased in the last two decades. In Japan, the turtles are harvested for their shell scutes, called bekko in Japanese. Bekko is used in various personal implements, such as eyeglass frames and the shamisen (Japanese traditional three-stringed instrument) picks. In 1994, Japan stopped importing hawksbill shells from other nations. Prior to this, the Japanese hawksbill shell trade was around 30,000 kg (66,000 lb) of raw shells per year. In Europe, hawksbill sea turtle shells were harvested by the ancient Greeks and ancient Romans for jewellery, such as combs, brushes, and rings. Recently, processed shells were regularly available in large amounts in countries including the Dominican Republic and Colombia.

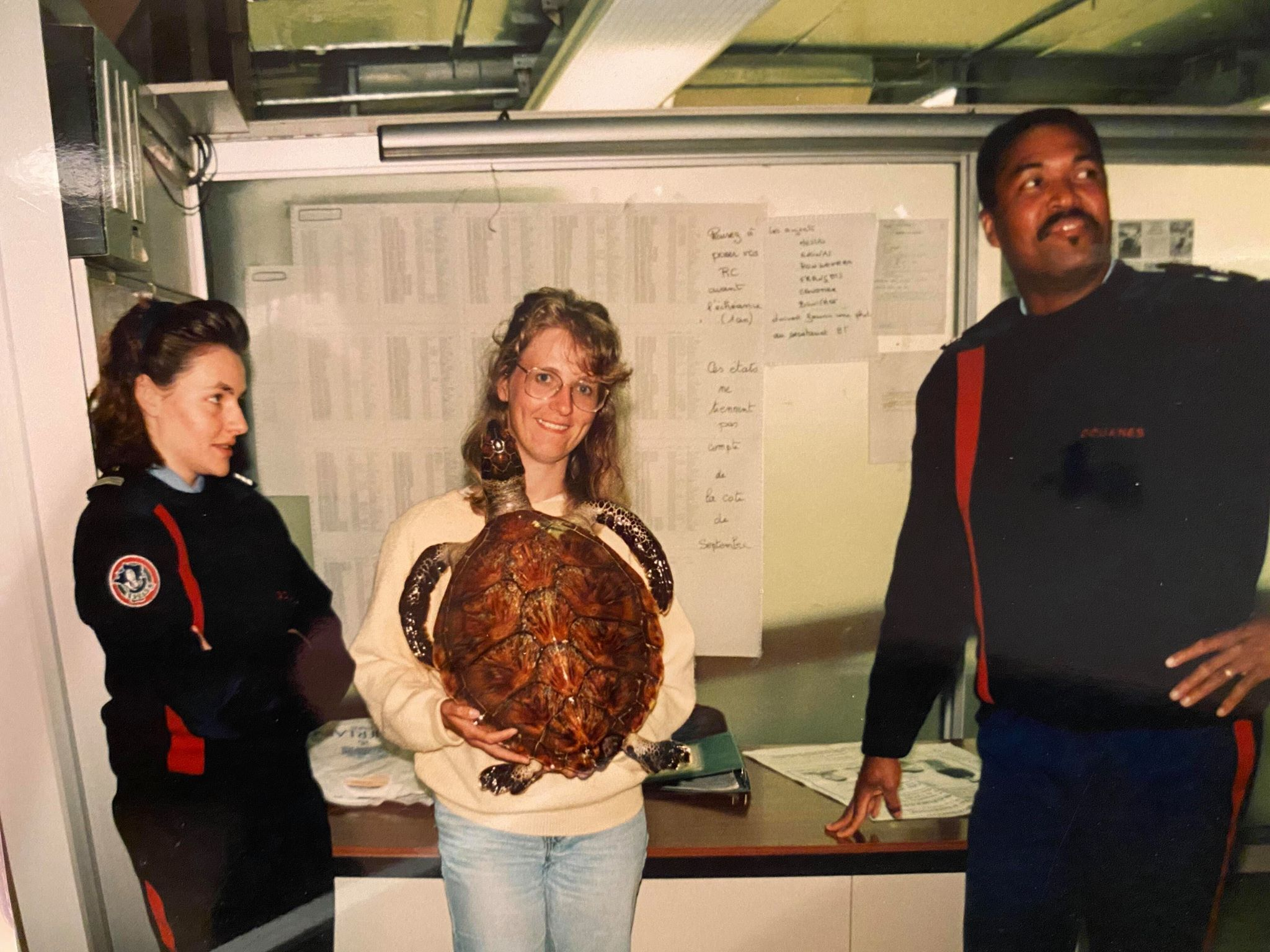
Captured taxidermied hawksbill from Mauritius at Orly Airport customs 1995

Global estimates of the historical exploitation of hawksbills have received recent attention. From 1950-1992, one pioneering study estimated that as many as 1.37 million adult hawksbills were killed in the international tortoiseshell trade alone. With the aid of substantial additional trade data, including official trade records from the imperial Japanese archives, the international trade of tortoiseshell was recently updated to have killed approximately 8.98 million hawksbills (range 4.64 to 9.83 million) from 1844-1992. Most of the trade occurred in the Pacific Ocean basin, and the countries of origin and trade routes bore similarity to what is known of illegal, unreported and unregulated fishing (IUU fishing).

== Conservation ==
Consensus has determined sea turtles, including E. imbricata to be at least threatened, because of their slow growth and maturity and low reproductive rates. Humans have killed many adult turtles, both accidentally and deliberately. Their existence is threatened due to pollution and loss of nesting areas because of coastal development. Biologists estimate that the hawksbill population has declined 80 percent in the past 100–135 years. Human and animal encroachment threatens nesting sites, and small mammals dig up the eggs to eat. In the US Virgin Islands, mongooses raid hawksbill nests (along with other sea turtles, such as Dermochelys coriacea) right after they are laid.

In 1982, the IUCN Red List of Threatened Species first listed E. imbricata as endangered. This endangered status continued through several reassessments in 1986, 1988, 1990, and 1994 until it was upgraded in status to critically endangered in 1996. Two petitions challenged its status as an endangered species prior to this, claiming the turtle (along with three other species) had several significant stable populations worldwide. These petitions were rejected based on their data analysis submitted by the Marine Turtle Specialist Group (MTSG). The MTSG data showed the worldwide hawksbill sea turtle population had declined by 80% in the three most recent generations, and no significant population increase had occurred as of 1996. CR A2 status was denied, however, because the IUCN did not find sufficient data to show the population likely to decrease by a further 80%.

The species (along with the entire Cheloniidae family) has been listed in Appendix I of the Convention on International Trade in Endangered Species. This means commercial international trade (including in parts and derivatives) is prohibited and non-commercial international trade is regulated.

Hawksbill turtles are listed in Annex II of the Protocol Concerning Specially Protected Areas and Wildlife to the Convention for the Protection and Development of the Marine Environment of the Wider Caribbean Region (SPAW), part of the Cartagena Convention.

The United States Fish and Wildlife Service and National Marine Fisheries Service have classified hawksbills as endangered under the Endangered Species Act since 1970. The US government established several recovery plans for protecting E. imbricata.

The Zoological Society of London has inscribed the reptile as an EDGE species, meaning that it is both endangered and highly genetically distinct, and therefore of particular concern for conservation efforts.

The World Wildlife Fund Australia (WWF-Australia) has several ongoing projects aiming at protecting the reptile.

On Rosemary Island, an island in the Dampier Archipelago off the Pilbara coast of Western Australia, volunteers have been monitoring hawksbill turtles since 1986. In November 2020, a 60-year old turtle first tagged in November 1990 and again in 2011 returned to the same location.
