= Ancorina =

Scientific classification
- Domain: Eukaryota
- Kingdom: Animalia
- Phylum: Porifera
- Class: Demospongiae
- Order: Tetractinellida
- Family: Ancorinidae
- Genus: Ancorina; Schmidt, 1862

Species
- See text

Synonyms
- Sanidastrella Topsent, 1892

Genus of sponges

Ancorina is a genus of sea sponges belonging to the family Ancorinidae. It is the type genus of its family.

This genus is characterized by a high density of siliceous spicules. Members of this genus are known to be eaten by hawksbill turtles.

== Species ==
The following species are recognised in the genus Ancorina:

- Ancorina bellae Kelly & Sim-Smith, 2012
- Ancorina brevidens Dendy & Frederick, 1924
- Ancorina buldira Lehnert & Stone, 2014
- Ancorina cerebrum Schmidt, 1862
- Ancorina corticata Lévi, 1964
- Ancorina diplococcus Dendy, 1924
- Ancorina geodides (Carter, 1886)
- Ancorina globosa Kelly & Sim-Smith, 2012
- Ancorina multistella (Lendenfeld, 1907)
- Ancorina nanosclera Lévi, 1967
- Ancorina radix Marenzeller, 1889
- Ancorina repens Wiedenmayer, 1989
- Ancorina robusta (Carter, 1883)
- Ancorina stalagmoides Dendy, 1924
