= Malabaricane =

Names
- IUPAC name (3S,3aS,5aS,9aS,9bS)-Dodecahydro-3a,6,6,9a-tetramethyl-3-[(5R)-1,5,9-trimethyldecyl]-1H-benz[e]indene

Identifiers
CAS Number	81575-65-7
3D model (JSmol)	Interactive image
ChemSpider	95601981
PubChem CID	101786192
UNII	FWV65QTD6J
- InChI: InChI=1S/C30H56/c1-22(2)12-9-13-23(3)14-10-15-24(4)25-16-17-27-29(25,7)21-18-26-28(5,6)19-11-20-30(26,27)8/h22-27H,9-21H2,1-8H3/t23-,24+,25+,26-,27+,29+,30+/m1/s1 Key: SGHXJVFMQPUFPZ-LKPKTCMESA-N
- SMILES: C[C@@H](CCC[C@H](C)[C@@H]1CC[C@H]2[C@]1(CC[C@H]3[C@@]2(CCCC3(C)C)C)C)CCCC(C)C

Properties
Chemical formula	C_{30}H_{56}
Molar mass	416.778 g·mol^{−1}
- Except where otherwise noted, data are given for materials in their standard state (at 25 °C [77 °F], 100 kPa). verify (what is ?) Infobox references

The molecule malabaricane and its derivatives, the malabaricanes, are triterpene and triterpenoid compounds found in various organisms. They are named after the rain forest tree Ailanthus malabarica (Ailanthus triphysa), from which they were first isolated in 1967 by scientists at the National Chemical Laboratory in Pune, India. Later, great varieties of malabaricanes were discovered in other organisms, mostly in marine sponges such as Rhabdastrella globostellata.

Isomalabaricanes are malabaricanes in which the three carbon rings of the molecule are connected in trans−syn−trans conformation, as opposed to other malabaricanes, where the rings are connected in trans−anti−trans conformation. They are of particular research interest because many of them have been reported to show anti-tumour activity in cell culture.
