= Spongivore =

Organism that feeds primarily on sea sponges

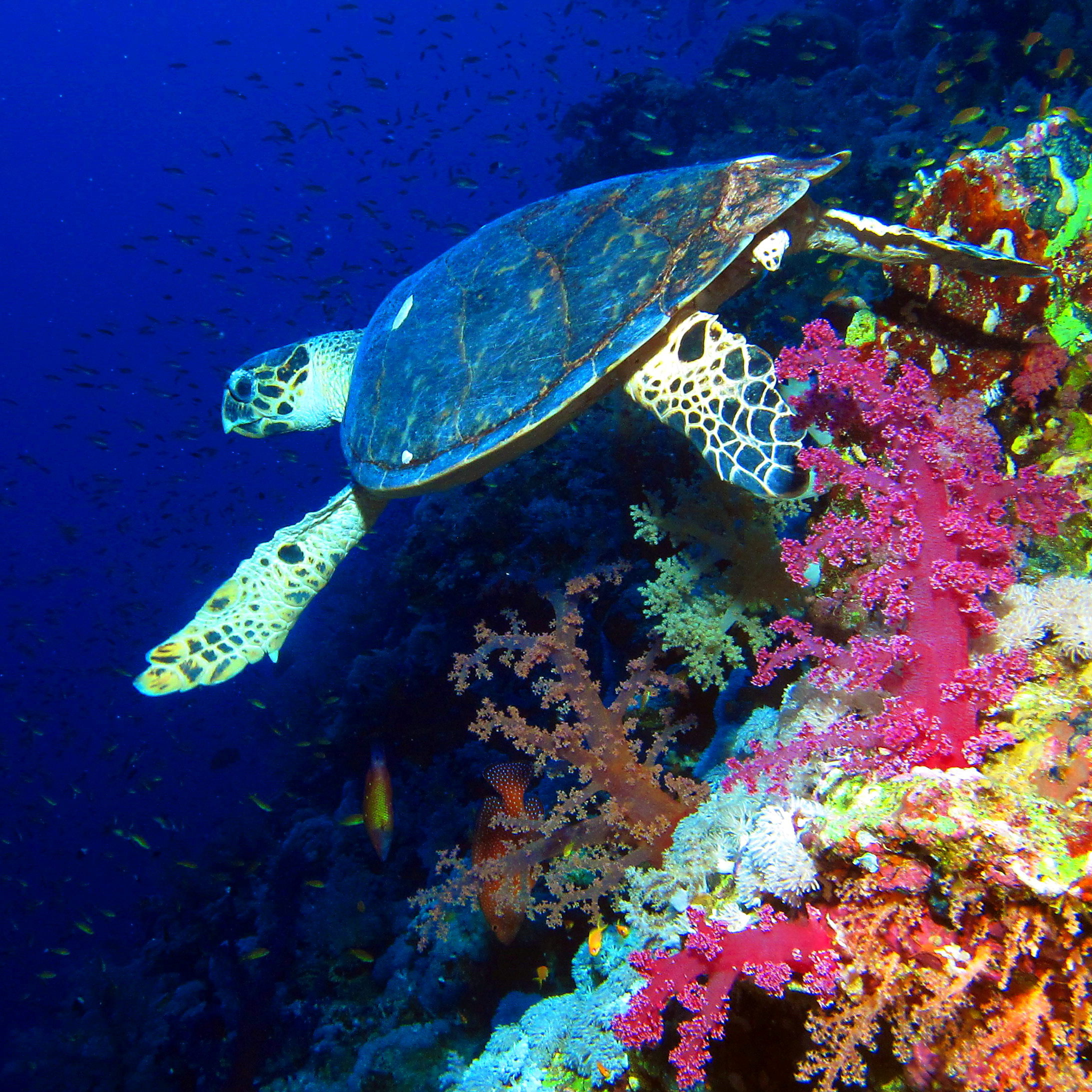
Hawksbill sea turtle, a spongivore

A spongivore is an animal anatomically and physiologically adapted to eating animals of the phylum Porifera, commonly called sea sponges, for the main component of its diet. As a result of their diet, spongivore animals like the hawksbill turtle have developed sharp, narrow bird-like beak that allows them to reach within crevices on the reef to obtain sponges.

== Examples ==
Spongillaflies (Neuroptera, Sisyridae), are a lineage comprising some 60 species of specialist feeders on freshwater sponges. The females deposit their eggs singly or as small clutches on plants that droop over freshwater lakes or slow-moving rivers. A protective web is spun to cover the eggs. When the larvae hatch, they drop down into the water where they develop until pupation. They use their elongated mouthparts to feed on freshwater sponges (typically of the genus Spongilla, hence the name "spongillaflies") and Phylactolaemata freshwater bryozoans, by piercing the host animals' body and sucking out cell contents. The larvae of some species cling to the surface of the sponge while others take refuge in the sponge's internal cavities. Development to pupation takes between several weeks and one year. Spongillafly larvae leave the water and go to hidden places nearby to pupate, choosing locations like beneath rocks or behind tree bark. They spin a cocoon for pupation, but in temperate climates they overwinter in the cocoon as larvae, pupating only the following spring.

The hawksbill turtle is one of the few vertebrates known to feed primarily on sponges. It is the only known spongivorous reptile. Sponges of various select species constitute up to 95% of the diets of Caribbean hawksbill turtle populations.

Pomacanthus imperator, the emperor angelfish; Lactophrys bicaudalis, the spotted trunkfish; and Stephanolepis hispidus, the planehead filefish are known spongivorous coral reef fish. The rock beauty Holocanthus tricolor is also spongivorous, with sponges making up 96% of their diet.

Certain species of nudibranchs are known to feed selectively on specific species of sponges.

== Attacks and counter-attacks ==
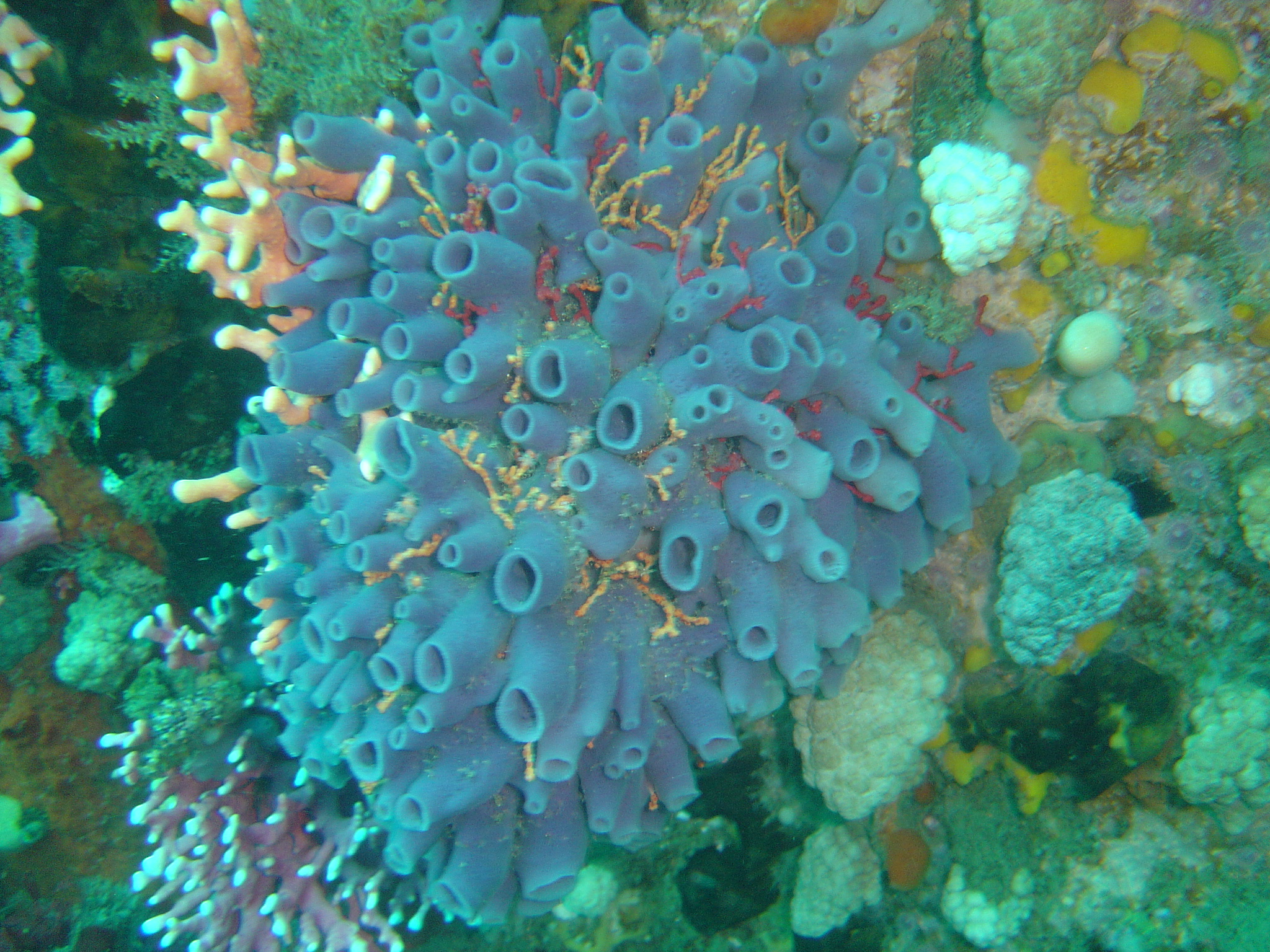
Turret sponge, eaten by some spongivores.

=== Spongivore offense ===
The many defenses displayed by sponges means that their spongivores need to learn skills to overcome these defenses to obtain their food. These skills allow spongivores to increase their feeding and use of sponges. Spongivores have three primary strategies for dealing with sponge defenses: choice based on colour, able to handle secondary metabolites and brain development for memory.

Choice based on colour was involved based on which sponge the spongivore would choose to eat. A spongivore would bite small sample of sponges and if they were unharmed then they would continue eating that specific sponge and then move on to another sponge of the same colour.

Spongivores have adapted to be able to handle the secondary metabolites that sponges have. Therefore, spongivores are able to consume a variety of sponges without getting harmed.

Spongivores also have enough brain development to be able to remember the same species of sponge it has eaten in the past and will continue to eat in the future.

=== Sponge defense ===
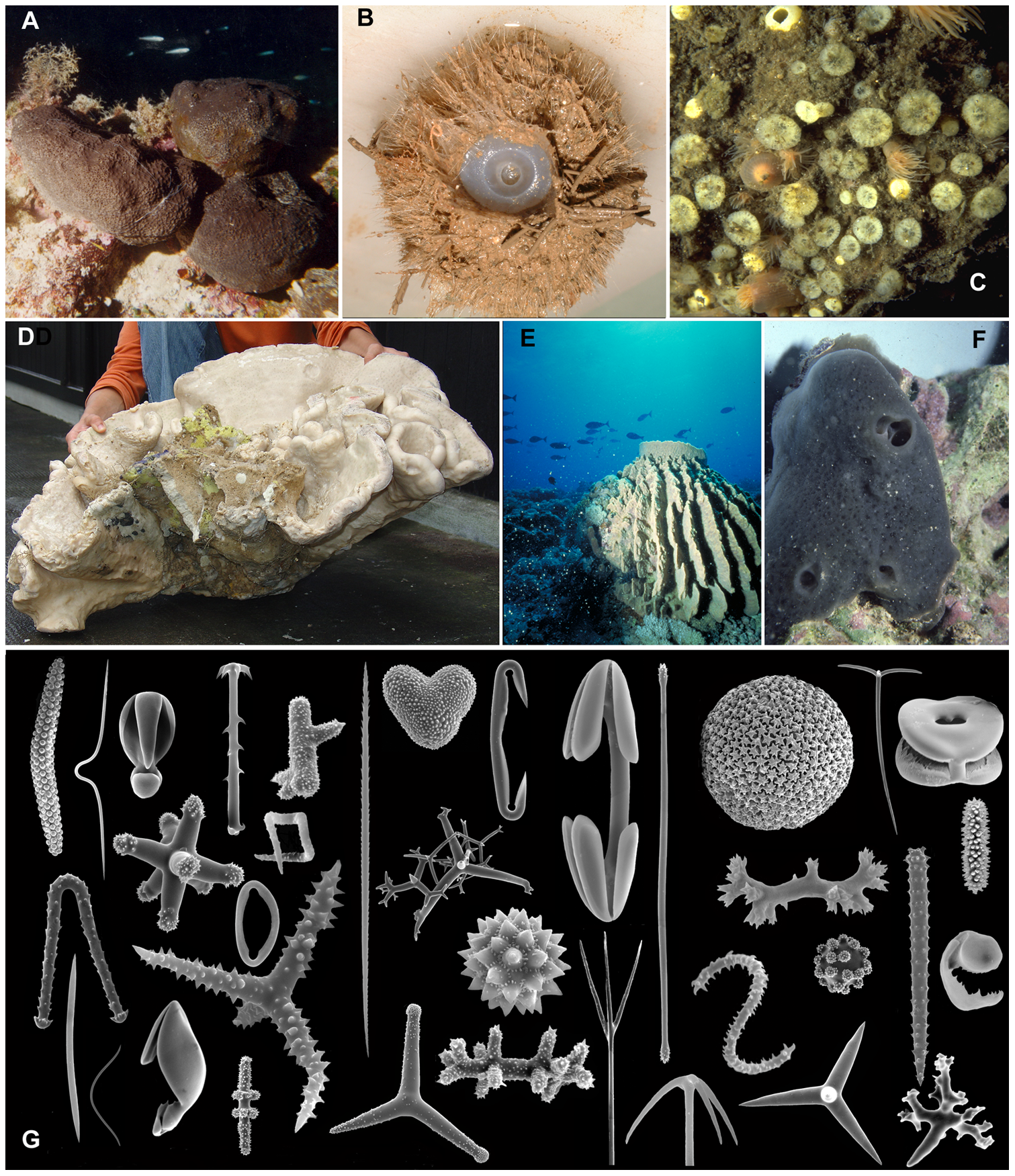
Sponge spicule

A sponge defense is a trait that increases a sponge's fitness when faced with a spongivore. This is measured relative to another sponge that lacks the defensive trait. Sponge defenses increase survival and/or reproduction (fitness) of sponges under pressure of predation from a spongivore.

Sponges utilize structural and chemical strategies to deter predation. One of the most common structural strategies that sponges have that prevents them from being consumed by predators is by having spicules. If a sponge contains spicules along with organic compounds, the likelihood of those sponges being consumed by spongivores decrease.

Sponges have also developed aposematism to help avoid predation. Spongivores have learned four things about sponges aposematism and they are as follows:

1. If it is poison some predators will not eat it
2. If It is conspicuously coloured, or advertises itself by means of some other signals;
3. Some predators avoid attacking it because of its signals
4. These conspicuous signals provide better protection to the individual or to its genes than would other (e.g. cryptic) signals.

Unfortunately, sponges that live in the deep sea are not at an advantage due to their colour because most colour in the deep sea is lost.

== Impacts ==
Sponges play an important role in the benthic fauna throughout temperate, tropical and polar habitats. If there is a high volume of predation it can effect bio erosion, reef creation, multiple habitats, other species and help with the nitrogen levels.

Bio erosion that occurs in the production of reef sediments and the structural component of corals are partly produced by sponges, where solid carbonate is processed into smaller fragments and fine sediments. Sponges also play a role in increasing the survival of live coral on Caribbean reefs by binding fragments together and is expected to increase the rates of carbonate accretion.

The coral reefs that contain higher amounts of sponges have better survival rate than the reefs with fewer sponges. Sponges can act as a stabilizer during storms as they help keep the reefs intact when presented with a strong currents. Sponges also grown between rocks and boulders, providing a more stable environment and lowering the disturbance levels. Sponges also provide habitats for other organisms to live in, without them, these organisms would not have a protected habitat.

Scientists have discovered that sponges play an important role in the nitrogen cycle. There are low amounts of nitrogen found in the water around coral reefs and most of the nitrogen that is found it bound into particulate or dissolved organic matter. Before this dissolved organic matter is able to be used by other reef organisms it must undergo a series of microbial transformations. The nitrogen cycle that occurs in sponges are able to cycle the nitrogen back into the water column and can be used by other organisms, especially cyanobacteria. The cyanobacteria then can then fix the atmospheric nitrogen and then the sponges can use it. Therefore, if there is a high amount of spongivores present in an environment, it can affect other aspects of the environment besides sponges.
