= Tethyopsis =

Scientific classification
- Domain: Eukaryota
- Kingdom: Animalia
- Phylum: Porifera
- Class: Demospongiae
- Order: Tetractinellida
- Family: Ancorinidae
- Genus: Tethyopsis; Stewart, 1870

Genus of sponges

Tethyopsis is a genus of sponges belonging to the family Ancorinidae.

The species of this genus are found in southern South Hemisphere and Malesia.

Species:

- Tethyopsis brondstedi (Burton, 1929)
- Tethyopsis calcifera (Bergquist, 1968)
- Tethyopsis columnifera Stewart, 1870
- Tethyopsis dubia Wilson, 1925
- Tethyopsis longispinus (Lendenfeld, 1907)
- Tethyopsis mortenseni (Brøndsted, 1924)
- Tethyopsis patriciae (Lévi, 1993)
- Tethyopsis plurima (Pulitzer-Finali, 1993)
- Tethyopsis radiata (Marshall, 1884)
