= Tribrachium =

Scientific classification
- Domain: Eukaryota
- Kingdom: Animalia
- Phylum: Porifera
- Class: Demospongiae
- Order: Tetractinellida
- Family: Ancorinidae
- Genus: Tribrachium; Weltner, 1882
- Species: T. schmidtii

Binomial name
- Tribrachium schmidtii Weltner, 1882

Genus of sponges

Tribrachium is a monotypic genus of sponges belonging to the family Ancorinidae. The only species is Tribrachium schmidtii.

The species is found in Southern America and Australia.
