= Ecionemia =

Scientific classification
- Domain: Eukaryota
- Kingdom: Animalia
- Phylum: Porifera
- Class: Demospongiae
- Order: Tetractinellida
- Family: Ancorinidae
- Genus: Ecionemia; Bowerbank, 1862

Species
- See text

Synonyms
- Ecionema [lapsus]; Hezekia Laubenfels, 1934; Thalassomora Lendenfeld, 1888

Genus of sponges

Ecionemia is a genus of sea sponges belonging to the family Ancorinidae.

This genus is characterized by a high density of siliceous spicules. Members of this genus are known to be eaten by hawksbill turtles.

== Species ==
The following species are recognised in the genus Ecionemia:

- Ecionemia acervus Bowerbank, 1862
- Ecionemia alata (Dendy, 1924)
- Ecionemia arabica (Lévi, 1958)
- Ecionemia australiensis (Carter, 1883)
- Ecionemia baculifera (Kirkpatrick, 1903)
- Ecionemia cinerea Thiele, 1900
- Ecionemia demera (Laubenfels, 1934)
- Ecionemia densa Bowerbank, 1873
- Ecionemia nigra Sollas, 1888
- Ecionemia novaezealandiae (Dendy, 1924)
- Ecionemia obtusum Lendenfeld, 1907
- Ecionemia spinastra Lévi, 1958
- Ecionemia thielei Thomas, 1986
- Ecionemia walkeri (Laubenfels, 1954)

== Bibliography ==
- "Ecionemia". Integrated Taxonomic Information System.
