= Ilha do Fogo, Mozambique =

Ilha do Fogo is an island in Mozambique

Ilha do Fogo
Nickname: Fire Island
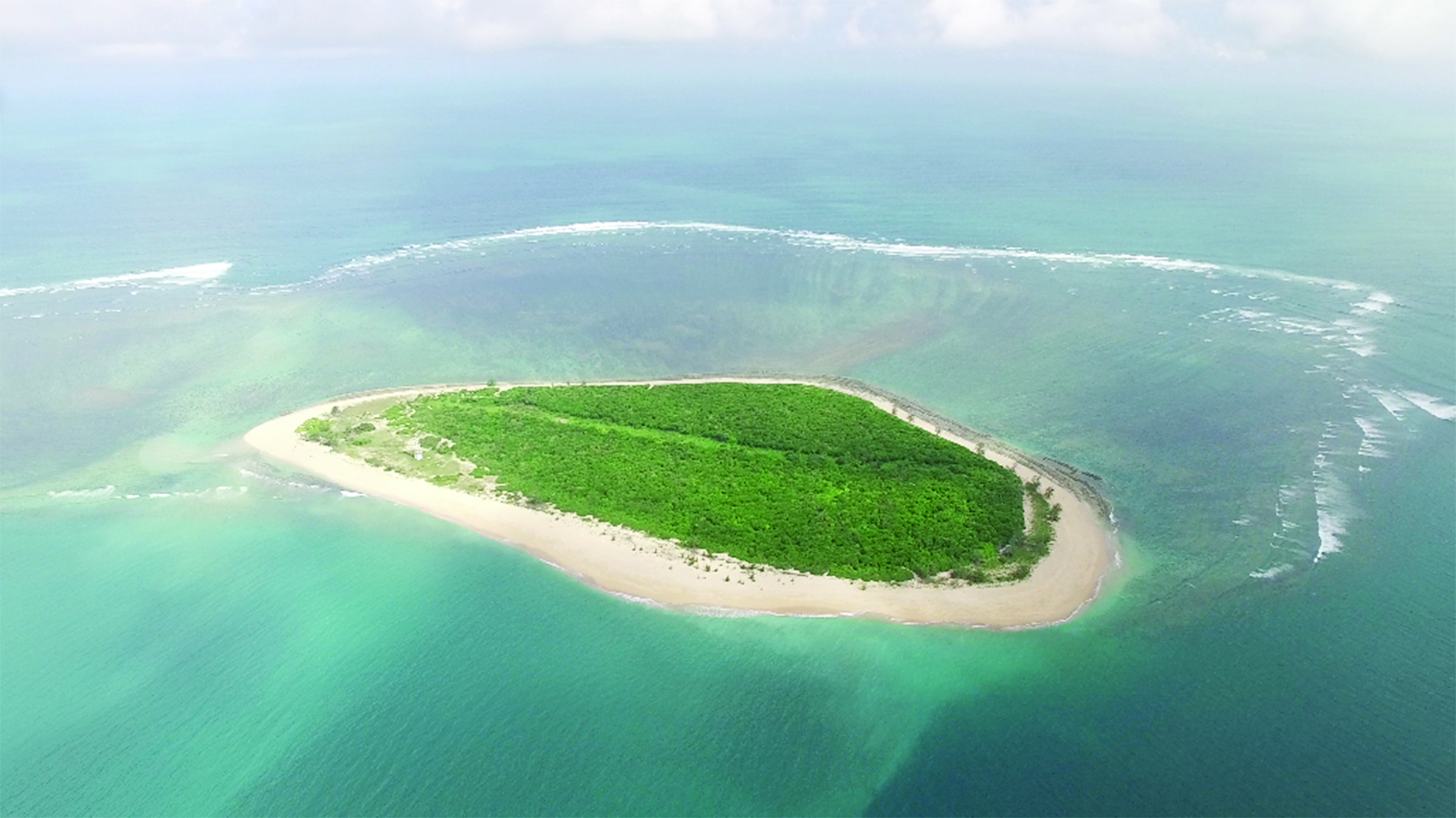

- Location within Mozambique

Geography
- Location: Indian Ocean
- Coordinates: 17.2338°S 38.8782°E
- Archipelago: Primeiras and Segundas Archipelago

Administration
- Mozambique

Ilha do Fogo, or Fire Island, is a remote, 3.5 km circumference island off the Zambezia Province coastline in northern Mozambique. It forms part of the Primeiras and Segundas Archipelago, within Africa's most extensive coastal marine protected area. The private island is encircled by coral-rich reefs on the island's south side and seagrasses on the north. It has 150 km of unexplored reef, with abundant and diverse marine life.

Northern Mozambique is thought to be a migratory corridor for endangered whale sharks and apex predators, including bull sharks and hammerhead sharks. Manta rays, devil rays, and stingrays are also likely visitors to the extensive reefs around the island.

== History ==
Ilha do Fogo and the islands of the Mozambique Channel hold importance in maritime history. The remains of European shipwrecks have been discovered at a number of sites along the coast, between Ilha do Fogo and Ilha de Moçambique, dating between the 16th and 19th centuries. Europeans discovered the Primeiras e Segundas archipelago in 1498, during Vasco da Gama's first expedition to India, a historically momentous voyage establishing the sea route to India.

After that, the islands became an important stopping point for Portuguese trading fleets. The islands were colonies of Portugal until Mozambican independence in 1975. In November 2012, the Mozambican government declared Primeiras e Segundas the country's first Environmental Protection Area

One of the most prominent features on the island is a lighthouse that was built in 1926. It has been repaired over the years and the current structure sits at 111 feet (34 m) tall.

Ilha do Fogo was purchased by the current owners in 2014 and at that time, the plan was to build a boutique resort. The owners soon realised there was an alarming problem with the harvesting of sea turtles around the island. The area's status as an Environmental Protection Area had no impact, as the island and its neighbouring towns of Boror and Pebane are so remote, that law enforcement is almost impossible.

== Conservation projects ==
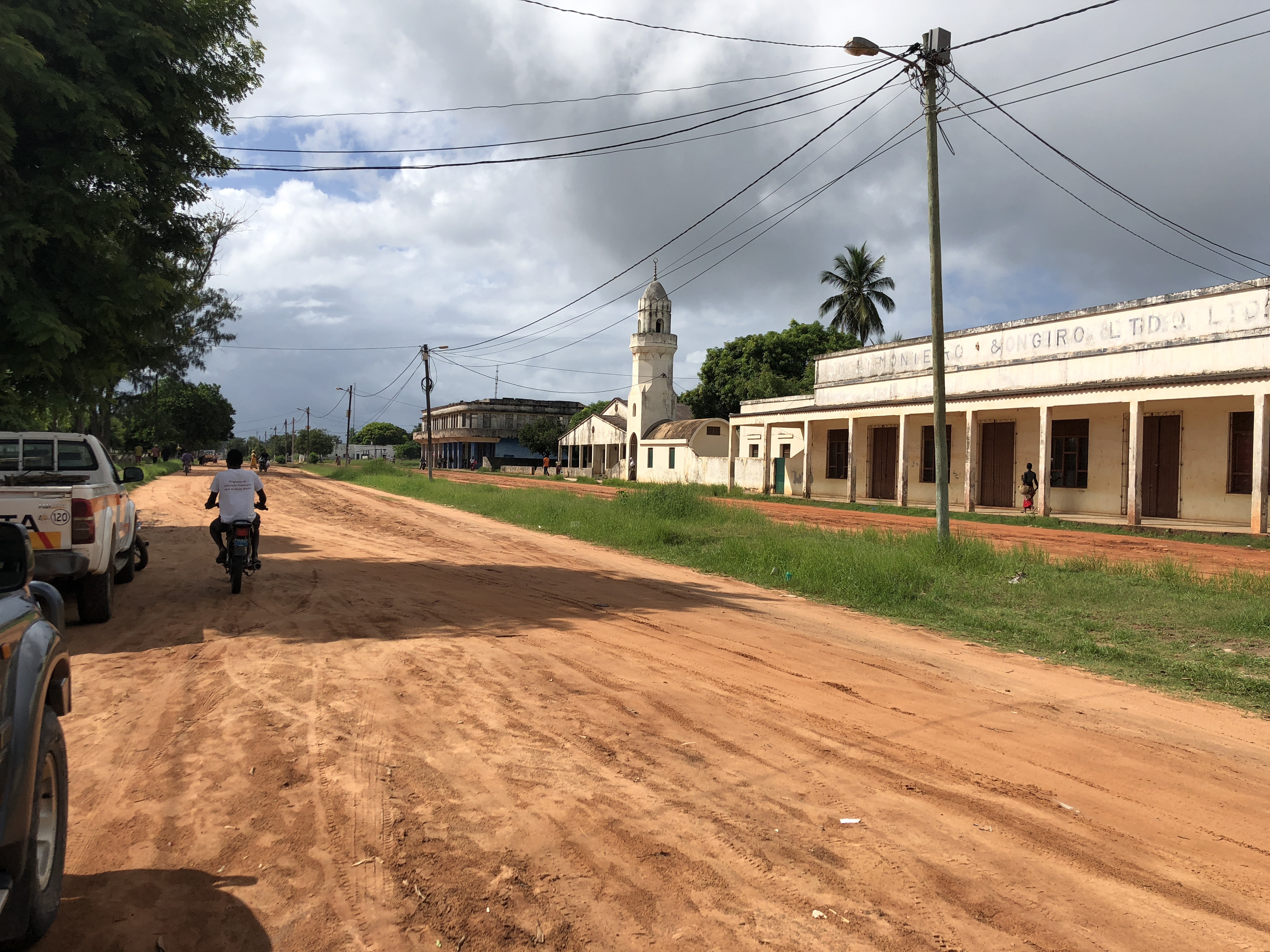
Pebane's remote village has a few brick buildings built by the Portuguese.

While conducting research for a documentary about the island and the threats to turtles, the team uncovered many underlying issues. They realised that there were numerous other species in danger of becoming extinct; the main issues being overexploitation, general depletion of natural resources, and destruction of habitat.

The island's resort plans were scrapped and the nonprofit organization Earth Legacy Foundation was founded. The organization has established projects that address the threats and put measures in place to protect and conserve marine life. They also address the social and economic issues that impact the ability to ensure the conservation of the area. Earth Legacy Foundation aims to find sustainable nature-based solutions, that will have a lasting, positive effect on both human and animal inhabitants. Projects include providing the local population with education, and alternative sources of income and nutrition.

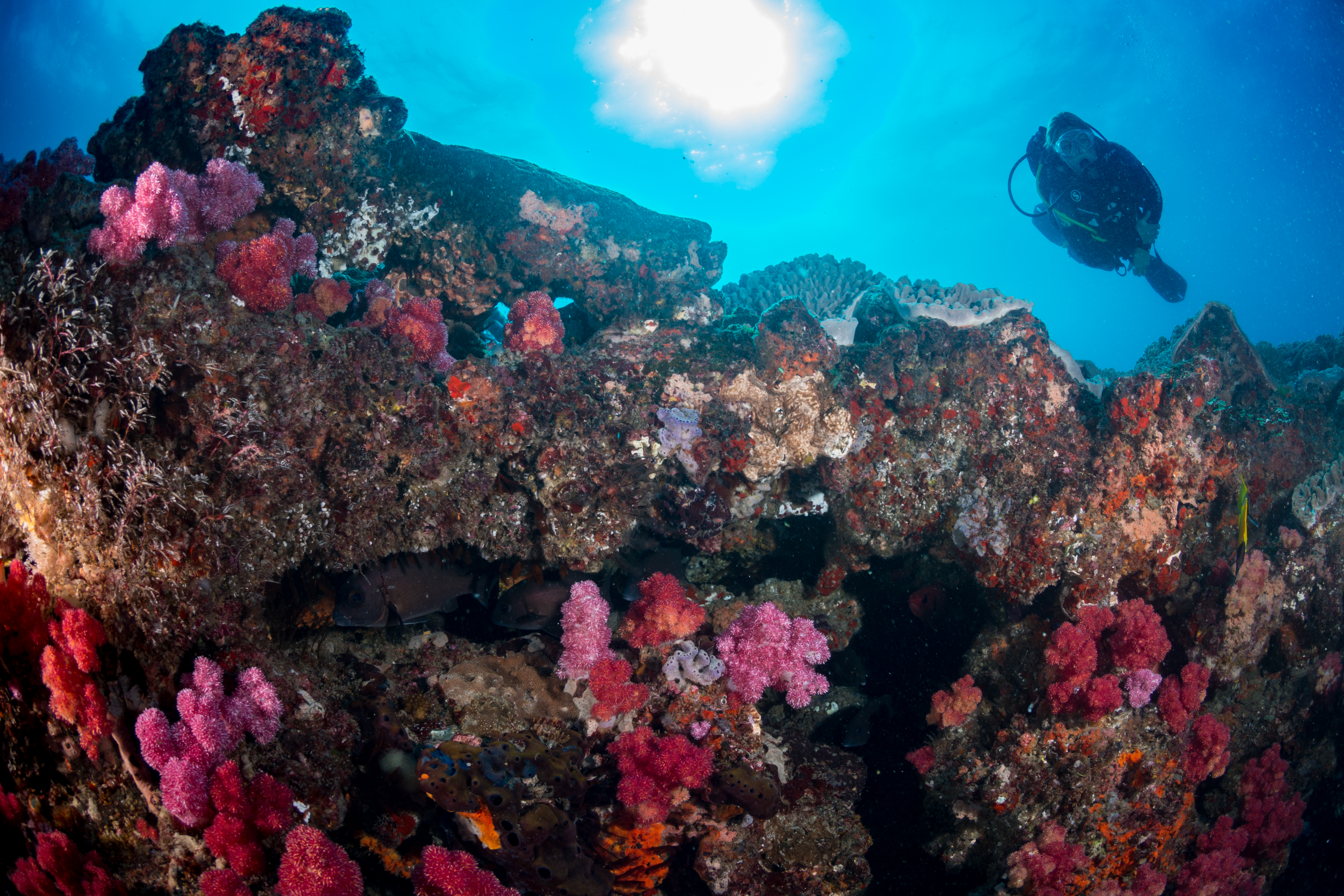
A coral reef on the coast of Ilha do Fogo

The main conservation project on the island is protecting endangered green turtles, vulnerable olive ridley turtles, and critically endangered hawksbill turtles. Ilha do Fogo is a regular nesting ground for these animals. All seven species of the world's sea turtles are now listed on the IUCN Red List of Threatened Species. The IUCN (International Union for Conservation of Nature) has a dedicated Marine Turtle Specialist Group (MTSG), which is one of the more than 160 Specialist Groups and Task Forces that make up the Species Survival Commission (SSC) of IUCN.

== Tourism ==
The island accepts small groups of scuba divers for retreats, to dive and experience the reefs, although the owners have stated that the Ilha do Fogo retreat has been developed with as low an impact as possible to the environment. A percentage of the profits from the scuba retreats goes back into the nonprofit's conservation and community projects.
