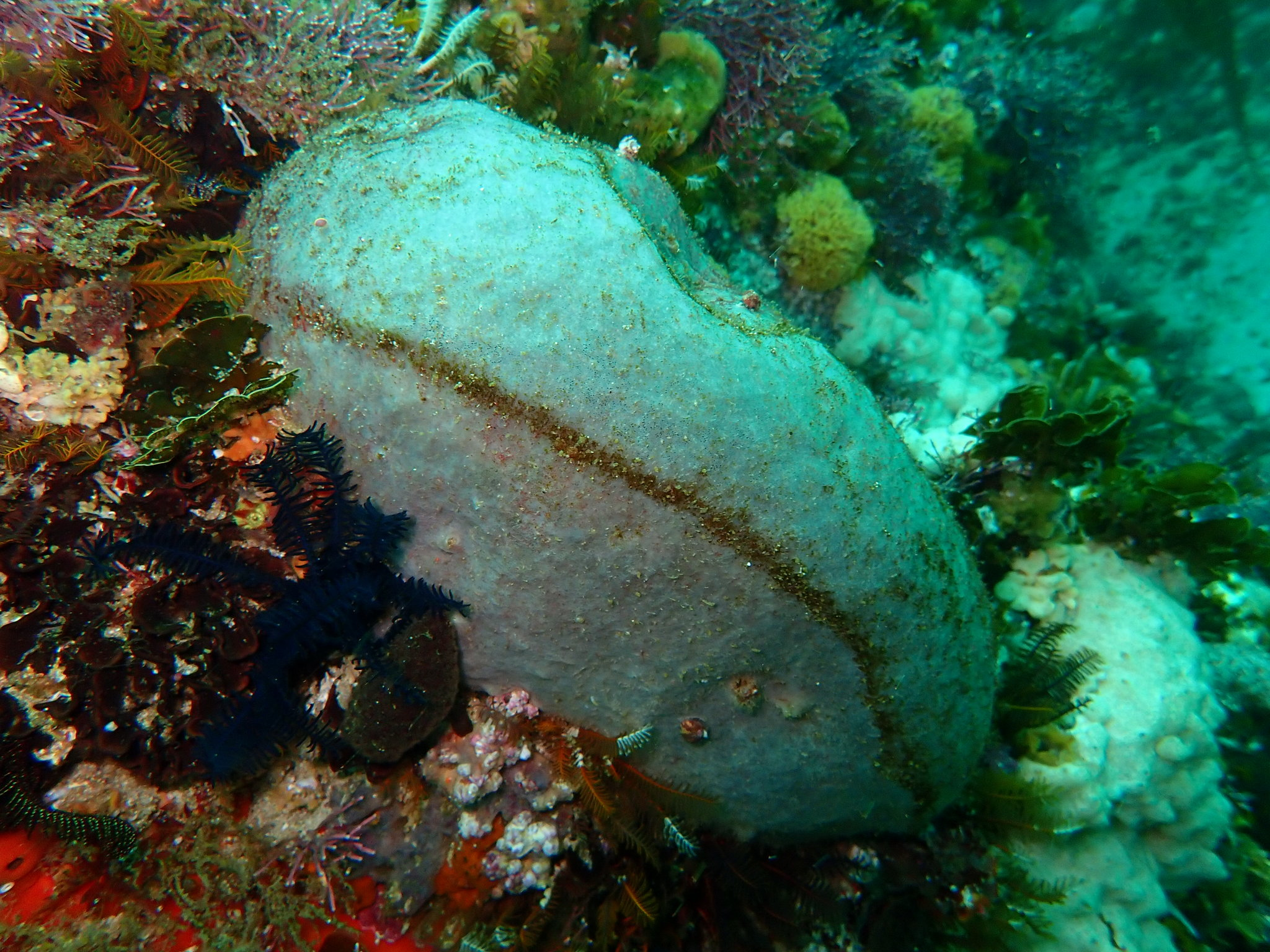

Scientific classification
- Kingdom: Animalia
- Phylum: Porifera
- Class: Demospongiae
- Order: Tetractinellida
- Family: Ancorinidae
- Genus: Stelletta; Schmidt, 1862

Species
- See text

Synonyms
- List: Anthastra Sollas, 1886; Astrella Sollas, 1886; Collingsia Gray, 1867; Cryptotethya Dendy, 1905; Dorypleres Sollas, 1888; Dragmastra Sollas, 1888; Monotria de Laubenfels, 1936; Myriastra Sollas, 1886; Myriastra (Pilochrota) Sollas, 1886; Pilochrota Sollas, 1886; Pumex Gray, 1867; Stellata [lapsus]; Stelletta (Astrella) Sollas, 1886; Stelletta (Myriastra) Sollas, 1886; Stelletta (Pilochrota) Sollas, 1886; Tethia Nardo, 1847

= Stelletta =

Genus of sponges

Stelletta is a genus of sea sponges belonging to the family Ancorinidae.

== Species ==
The following species are recognised in the genus Stelletta:

- Stelletta addita (Topsent, 1938)
- Stelletta aeruginosa Carter, 1886
- Stelletta agglutinans (Dendy, 1905)
- Stelletta agulhana Lendenfeld, 1907
- Stelletta anancora (Sollas, 1886)
- Stelletta anasteria Esteves & Muricy, 2005
- Stelletta anthastra Lehnert & Stone, 2014
- Stelletta arenaria Bergquist, 1968
- Stelletta aruensis Hentschel, 1912
- Stelletta atrophia Hoshino, 1981
- Stelletta beae Hajdu & Carvalho, 2003
- Stelletta bocki Rao, 1941
- Stelletta boglicii Schmidt, 1862
- Stelletta brevidens (Topsent, 1897)
- Stelletta brevioxea Pulitzer-Finali, 1993
- Stelletta brevis Hentschel, 1909
- Stelletta calyx Sim & Kim, 2003
- Stelletta capensis Lévi, 1967
- Stelletta carolinensis (Wells, Wells & Gray, 1960)
- Stelletta cavernosa (Dendy, 1916)
- Stelletta centroradiata Lévi & Lévi, 1983
- Stelletta centrotyla Lendenfeld, 1907
- Stelletta clarella de Laubenfels, 1930
- Stelletta clavosa Ridley, 1884
- Stelletta colombiana (Wintermann-Kilian & Kilian, 1984)
- Stelletta communis (Sollas, 1886)
- Stelletta conulosa Bergquist, 1968
- Stelletta crassicula Carter, 1881
- Stelletta crassispicula (Sollas, 1886)
- Stelletta crater Dendy, 1924
- Stelletta crusta Shim & Sim, 2009
- Stelletta cyathoides Burton, 1926
- Stelletta cylindrica Thomas, 1973
- Stelletta debilis Thiele, 1900
- Stelletta defensa Pulitzer-Finali, 1983
- Stelletta dendyi (Sollas, 1888)
- Stelletta dichoclada Pulitzer-Finali, 1983
- Stelletta digitata (Pulitzer-Finali, 1993)
- Stelletta digitifera (Lévi, 1959)
- †Stelletta discoidea Rutot, 1874
- Stelletta discolor Bösraug, 1913
- Stelletta dorsigera Schmidt, 1864
- Stelletta durissima Bergquist, 1965
- Stelletta eduardoi Desqueyroux-Faúndez & van Soest, 1997
- Stelletta estrella de Laubenfels, 1930
- Stelletta farcimen Lendenfeld, 1907
- Stelletta fibrosa (Schmidt, 1870)
- Stelletta fibulifera Schmidt, 1880
- Stelletta freitasi Lévi, 1964
- Stelletta gigantea Tanita, 1965
- Stelletta gigas (Sollas, 1886)
- Stelletta globulariformis (Wilson, 1902)
- Stelletta grubii Schmidt, 1862
- Stelletta grubioides Burton, 1926
- Stelletta hajdui Lerner & Mothes, 1999
- Stelletta herdmani Dendy, 1905
- Stelletta hispida (Buccich, 1886)
- Stelletta horrens Kirkpatrick, 1902
- Stelletta hyperoxea Lévi & Lévi, 1983
- Stelletta incrustata Uliczka, 1929
- Stelletta individua (Schmidt, 1870)
- Stelletta inermis (Topsent, 1904)
- Stelletta japonica Lebwohl, 1914
- Stelletta jonesi (Thomas, 1973)
- Stelletta kallitetilla (de Laubenfels, 1936)
- Stelletta kieschnicki Van Soest & Hooper, 2020
- Stelletta kundukensis Sim, 1996
- Stelletta lactea Carter, 1871
- Stelletta latiancora Topsent, 1928
- Stelletta lithodes Bergquist, 1968
- Stelletta longicladus Dendy & Burton, 1926
- Stelletta makushina Lehnert & Stone, 2014
- Stelletta mamilliformis Carter, 1886
- Stelletta maori Dendy, 1924
- Stelletta mauritiana (Dendy, 1916)
- Stelletta maxima Thiele, 1898
- Stelletta mediterranea (Topsent, 1893)
- Stelletta megaspina Lendenfeld, 1907
- Stelletta misakensis Lebwohl, 1914
- Stelletta morikawai Tanita, 1961
- Stelletta mortarium Díaz & Cárdenas, 2024
- Stelletta moseleyi (Sollas, 1888)
- Stelletta naseana Thiele, 1898
- Stelletta normani Sollas, 1880
- Stelletta novaezealandiae Brøndsted, 1924
- Stelletta obtusus (Lendenfeld, 1907)
- Stelletta orientalis Thiele, 1898
- Stelletta orthotriaena Koltun, 1966
- Stelletta osculifera (Lévi, 1964)
- Stelletta ovalae Tanita, 1965
- Stelletta pachydermata (Sollas, 1886)
- Stelletta parva (Row, 1911)
- Stelletta parvispicula (Sollas, 1886)
- Stelletta paucistellata Lévi, 1952
- Stelletta phialimorpha Lévi, 1993
- Stelletta phrissens Sollas, 1886
- Stelletta pisum Thiele, 1898
- Stelletta plagioreducta Lévi, 1961
- Stelletta porosa Kieschnick, 1896
- Stelletta pudica (Wiedenmayer, 1977)
- Stelletta pulchra (Sollas, 1886)
- Stelletta pulvinata (Lamarck, 1815)
- Stelletta pumex (Nardo, 1847)
- Stelletta purpurea Ridley, 1884
- Stelletta pygmaeorum Schmidt, 1880
- Stelletta pyriformis (Sollas, 1886)
- Stelletta radicifera Wilson, 1925
- Stelletta retroclada Lévi, 1967
- Stelletta rhaphidiophora Hentschel, 1929
- Stelletta ridleyi (Sollas, 1886)
- Stelletta ruetzleri Mothes & Silva, 2002
- Stelletta rugosa Burton, 1926
- Stelletta sandalinum Brøndsted, 1924
- Stelletta siemensi Keller, 1891
- Stelletta sigmatriaena Lendenfeld, 1907
- Stelletta simplicissima (Schmidt, 1868)
- Stelletta solida Tanita, 1963
- Stelletta solidissima (Wilson, 1902)
- Stelletta soteropolitana Cosme & Peixinho, 2007
- Stelletta sphaerica Burton, 1926
- Stelletta sphaeroides Kieschnick, 1896
- Stelletta spinulosa Sim & Kim, 2003
- Stelletta splendens Tanita, 1965
- Stelletta stellata Topsent, 1893
- Stelletta stellifera Kieschnick, 1896
- Stelletta stenospiculata Uliczka, 1929
- Stelletta subtilis (Sollas, 1886)
- Stelletta tenuis Lindgren, 1897
- Stelletta tenuispicula (Sollas, 1886)
- Stelletta teres Lebwohl, 1914
- Stelletta tethyoides Lendenfeld, 1888
- Stelletta tethyopsis Carter, 1880
- Stelletta tethytimeata Calcinai, Bastari, Bertolino & Pansini, 2017
- Stelletta tetrafurcata Hoshino, 1981
- Stelletta thomasi Van Soest & Hooper, 2020
- Stelletta toxiastra Lévi, 1993
- Stelletta trichotriaena Dendy & Burton, 1926
- Stelletta trisclera Lévi, 1967
- Stelletta tuba Lebwohl, 1914
- Stelletta tuberculata (Carter, 1886)
- Stelletta tuberosa (Topsent, 1892)
- Stelletta tulearensis Vacelet, Vasseur & Lévi, 1976
- Stelletta vaceleti Lévi & Lévi, 1983
- Stelletta validissima Thiele, 1898
- Stelletta variabilis (Wilson, 1902)
- Stelletta variohamata Thiele, 1900
- Stelletta ventricosa (Topsent, 1904)
- Stelletta vervoorti Van Soest, 2017
- Stelletta vestigium Dendy, 1905
- Stelletta vosmaeri (Sollas, 1886)
- Stelletta wilsoni Van Soest & Hooper, 2020
