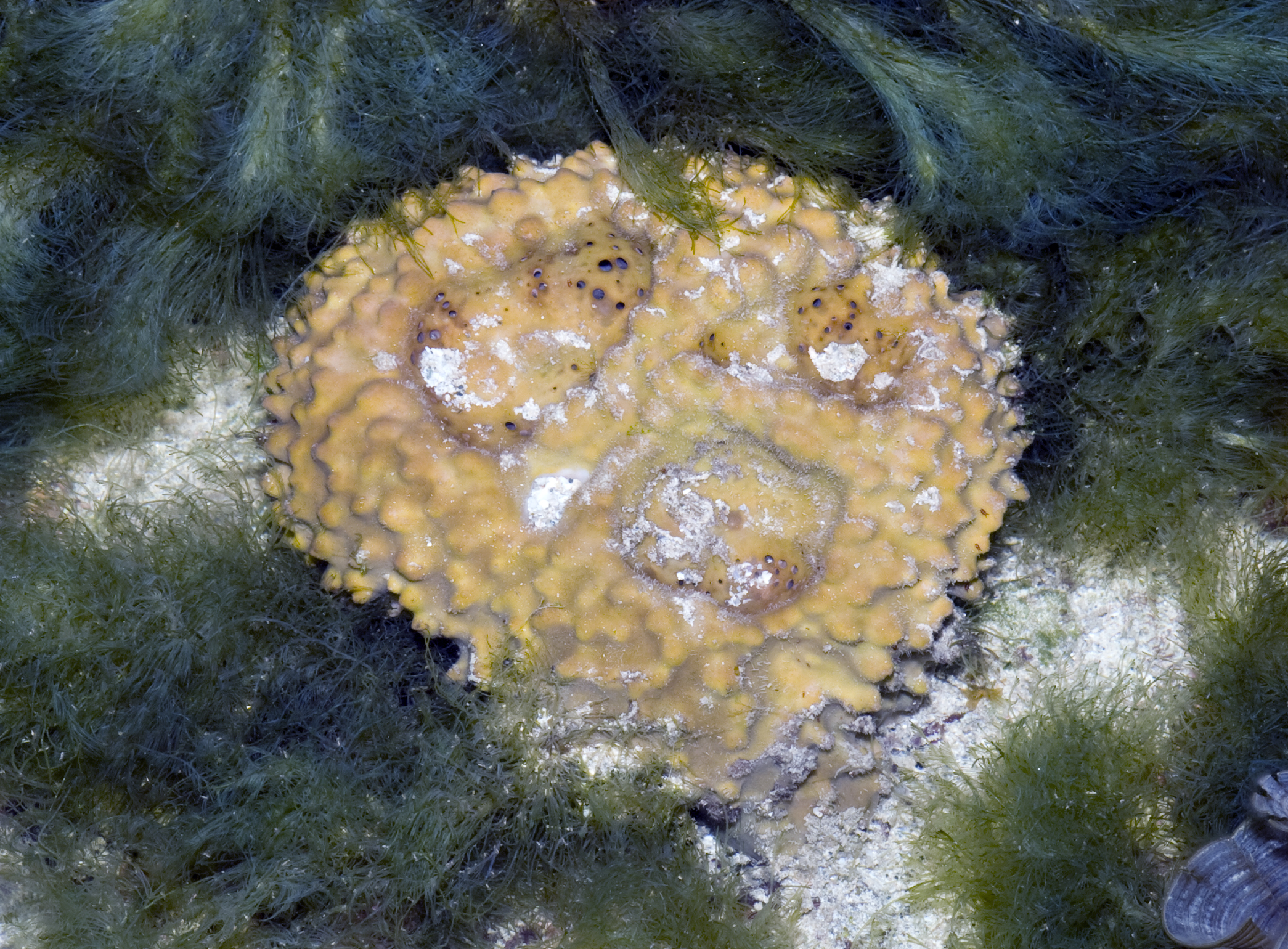
- Rhabdastrella globostellata

Scientific classification
- Kingdom: Animalia
- Phylum: Porifera
- Class: Demospongiae
- Order: Tetractinellida
- Family: Ancorinidae; Schmidt, 1870

Genera
- See text

Synonyms
- Coppatiidae Topsent, 1898; Sanidasterinae Sollas, 1888; Stellettidae Carter, 1875; Stellettinae Carter, 1875

= Ancorinidae =

Family of marine sponges in the order Tetractinellida

Ancorinidae is a family of marine sponges belonging to the order of Tetractinellida.

== Genera ==
- Ancorina Schmidt, 1862
- Asteropus Sollas, 1888
- Chelotropella Lendenfeld, 1907
- Cryptosyringa Vacelet, 1979
- Dercitus Gray, 1867
- Disyringa Sollas, 1888
- Ecionemia Bowerbank, 1862
- Holoxea Topsent, 1892
- Jaspis Gray, 1867
- Psammastra Sollas, 1886
- Rhabdastrella Thiele, 1903
- Stelletta Schmidt, 1862
- Stellettinopsis Carter, 1879
- Stryphnus Sollas, 1886
- Tethyopsis Stewart, 1870
- Tribrachium Weltner, 1882
