= Shirley A. Pomponi =

American marine biologist

Shirley Ann Pomponi is an American marine biologist who studies sea sponges. Pomponi found a Discodermia dissoluta specimen in 1987, and a compound from it was used as a cancer drug. Her research on sponges led to the anti-herpes medicine Zovirax being created, and her research on cone snails led to the pain killer Prialt being created. She won multiple awards for her work.

== Education and career ==
In 1977, Pomponi graduated from the University of Miami with a Ph.D. in Biological Oceanography. Pomponi has researched sea sponges at the University of Miami, the University of Maryland, and at Harbor Branch Oceanographic Institution. She became a part of Harbor Branch in 1984, followed by working with Biomedical Marine Research in 1994 as the director.

In 1987, Pomponi found a sponge that was new to her, while scuba diving, that researchers believed could potentially cure cancer. The sponge was Discodermia dissoluta and the compound derived from it is Discodermolide. Pomponi and others researched if Discodermolide could also work as an immune suppressant and were granted the patent to Discodermolide. In 1998, the company Novartis signed a deal to develop the compound into a cancer drug. Her research on sponges helped the anti-herpes medicine Zovirax be created, and her research on cone snails helped the pain killer Prialt be created.

Pomponi's research has involved identifying bioerosion on the coral skeletons of sponges, testing how climate change affects sponges along the coral reef, creating a 3D diagram of a sponge's cell system, cryopreserving sponge cells, discovering pharmaceutical uses of sponges, licensing metabolites from sponges, and applying technology to create therapeutic products. Pomponi was on the "President's Panel on Ocean Exploration, was a member of the National Science Foundation’s Advisory Committee for Geosciences, and co-chaired 3 National Academy studies". She was in charge of many global research studies. That President's Panel led to the National Oceanic and Atmospheric Administration and the United States Congress to fund marine science. The funding allowed Pomponi to collect over "30,000 marine invertebrate and algal specimens". The specimens are in use to discover new drugs. In 2016, Pomponi and Guojun Wang were rewarded a grant to produce lasonolide A in a laboratory based on the genes that the compound naturally receives. It was an attempt to find a new cure for cancer.

== Awards ==
Pomponi was inducted into the Women Divers Hall of Fame in 2003, and she later worked as the chairperson of the organization's scholarship committee in 2005. Pomponi won the Society for In Vitro Biology Lifetime Achievement Award in 2022 for "her scientific and humanitarian career that spans decades of pioneering contributions, scientific advances and contributions to marine invertebrate biotechnology, biological oceanography and international marine policy." Pomponi won the 2024 NOGI Science Award which was awarded for "outstanding contributions to understanding and safeguarding our ocean environments". She was the 24th woman to receive the award.
