= Lyn Beazley =

Australian neuroscientist

Lyn Beazley AO FAA FTSE

2nd Chief Scientist of Western Australia
- Preceded by: Bruce Edward Hobbs
- Succeeded by: Peter Klinken

Personal details
- Born: Lynda Dent Beazley; 3 July 1944 (age 81) Gravesend, UK
- Education: University of Oxford
- Profession: Neuroscientist

Lynda Dent Beazley (born 1944) is a neuroscientist and educator based in Perth, Western Australia. She is currently an Honorary Distinguished Fellow at the Institute of Advanced Studies at the University of Western Australia, and the Sir Walter Murdoch Distinguished Professor of Science at Murdoch University. Among other awards, she has been named an Officer of the Order of Australia for her contributions to medical science a Fellow of the Australian Academy of Technology and Engineering and Fellow of the Australian Academy of Science.

== Education ==
Beazley studied zoology at the University of Oxford before completing a PhD at the University of Edinburgh on the development of vision and its recovery after injury.

== Career ==
She set up her research group as a National Health and Medical Research Council research fellow at the University of Western Australia in 1976, which she held until 1994 when she was appointed professor. Research stemming from a collaboration with Professor John Newnham led to changes in clinical practice around administration of corticosteroids to women at risk of pre-term delivery with prematurely mature fetal lungs, improving respiratory function in pre-term infants.

Beazley was Western Australia's Chief Scientist from 2006 to 2013, advising the State Government on science, innovation, and technology. Her work included setting up a nationwide hotline for laboratory technicians in schools, working for healthier waterways across the state by establishing Dolphin Watch, and she was successful in securing Western Australia as the host of the low frequency part of the telescope of the Square Kilometre Array (SKA-low) at the Murchison Radio-astronomy Observatory in Western Australia. She was a Mission Leader for the Australia Israel Chamber of Commerce (WA) mission to Israel in 2008.

Beazley is also known as an educator and education advocate, spanning lecturing at university level, and working to encourage school child engagement in science, and is a Fellow of the Australian College of Educators.

Beazley is a current or former board member of the Royal Perth Hospital Research Foundation, the Western Australian Art Gallery Foundation, the Terrestrial Ecosystem Research Network, and the Ear Sciences Institute of Australia. She is a patron of the Reflections Through Reality Foundation, the Western Australian Naturalists' Club, and Vice-Patron of the Western Australia Royal Society. She is a current or former Advisory Board member for Monash Vision Group for Bionic Vision, and the Australian Research Council Centre of Excellence for Integrative Brain Function. Beazley is also a member of the Technology and Industry Advisory Council of the Western Australian Government. She was a Trustee of the Western Australian Museum from 1999 to 2006. She helped establish the Brightwater Lyn Beazley Scholarship for research into acquired brain injury rehabilitation.

== Recognition and awards ==
In 2009, a new species of sponge discovered in the Perth Canyon off Rottnest Island was named Manihinea lynbeazleyae after Beazley.

- 2009 Awarded Officer of the Order of Australia for her services to medical science
- 2009 Fellow of Australian Academy of Technology & Engineering
- 2011 Western Australian Women's Hall of Fame
- 2012 Governor's Award for Giving
- 2013 Inducted into WA Science Hall of Fame
- 2015 WA Australian of the Year
- 2015 RiAus Honorary Bragg Membership
- 2014 Paul Harris Fellow of Rotary International
- 2018 Honorary Doctor of Science ANU
- 2019 Fellow of the Australian Academy of Science
