= Manihinea lynbeazleyae =

Scientific classification
- Kingdom: Animalia
- Phylum: Porifera
- Class: Demospongiae
- Order: Tetractinellida
- Family: Theonellidae
- Genus: Manihinea
- Species: M. lynbeazleyae

Binomial name
- Manihinea lynbeazleyae Fromont & Pisera, 2011

Species of sponge

WAMZ31539 site

Manihinea lynbeazleyae is a species of deep-water sea sponge in the Theonellidae family, first described by Jane Fromont and Andrzej Pisera in 2011, from a specimen collected in the Perth canyon west of Rottnest Island at a depth of 194–232 m.

The species epithet, lynbeazleyae, honours Lyn Beazley (at the time Chief Scientist of Western Australia, and a dedicated advocate of taxonomic science and sponge research).

Like all members of the class Demospongiae, this sponge is hermaphroditic. M. lynbeazleyae is a deep water tree-like sponge found at between 194 and 232 metres depth on soft sediment. It grows to about 19 cm high and 14 cm wide, and has branches which are 1.5 to 2.5 cm in diameter. It has a bright orange exterior, while its interior is bright orange-yellow.
