= Discodermia calyx =

Scientific classification
- Domain: Eukaryota
- Kingdom: Animalia
- Phylum: Porifera
- Class: Demospongiae
- Order: Tetractinellida
- Family: Theonellidae
- Genus: Discodermia
- Species: D. calyx

Binomial name
- Discodermia calyx Döderlein, 1884

Synonyms
- Theonella calyx (Döderlein, 1884)

Species of sponge

Discodermia calyx is a species of bowl-shaped sponge that is found in shallow waters in central and southern Japan. The species is distributed by the central Kuroshio current and is therefore localized along this current. Like many other sponges, D. calyx are very porous. They use the pores in their outer walls to draw in water which they then expel, retaining the nutrients dissolved in the water to nourish themselves. To keep water flowing in and out, the flagella that line their pores beat in either direction.

The toxin calyculin A, used in medical research, can be extracted from this species.

== Taxonomy ==
Discodermia calyx was originally described by Ludwig Döderlein in 1884. It is a demosponge in the order Tetractinellida and family Theonellidae. D. calyx has no colloquial name, as it is known primarily in scientific and medicinal contexts.

== Use in research ==
Discodermia calyx is one of a few sponges that contain the molecule known as calyculin A. This well-studied toxin was discovered originally in D. calyx. When it was first studied it was discovered to be a phosphatase inhibitor, it stops an enzyme that dephosphorylates proteins within the cell. Calyculin A was studied in an experiment that used breast cancer cells. The toxin extracted from this primitive species enhanced the phosphorylation of cyclin D1. This caused the degradation of cyclin D1, which leads to arrest in cell cycle progression in the breast cancer cells. This, among other studies established calyculin as a phosphatase inhibitor. This toxin, and therefore this species, among others with similar toxins, became increasingly studied and important in medicine, particularly relating to chemotherapy. In a later study, scientist concluded that the calyculin A, from D. calyx, also blocks calcium influx by blocking non-selective ion channels in the cell. Later research looked into D. calyx as a species to look at the natural mechanisms that can be used to regulate the toxicity of calyculin A. Scientists found regulation through phosphorylation and dephosphorylation. These among other studies focus on regulation of the toxin as a characteristic of the sponge Discodermia calyx because of its implications in the fight to cure cancer.
