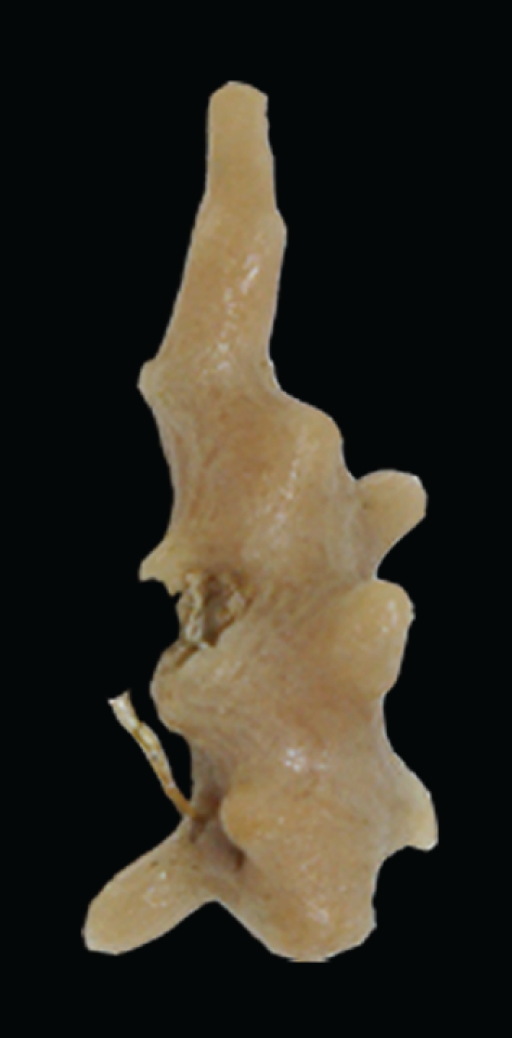
- Discodermia ramifera

Scientific classification
- Domain: Eukaryota
- Kingdom: Animalia
- Phylum: Porifera
- Class: Demospongiae
- Order: Tetractinellida
- Family: Theonellidae
- Genus: Discodermia du Bocage, 1869

Synonyms
- Collinella Schmidt, 1879; Desmahabana Alcolado & Gotera, 1986

= Discodermia =

Genus of sponges

Discodermia is a genus of deep-water sea sponge.

== Species ==
The following species are accepted within Discodermia:

- Discodermia adhaerens Van Soest, Meesters & Becking, 2014
- Discodermia arbor Carvalho & Xavier, 2020
- Discodermia aspera Carter, 1880
- Discodermia calyx Döderlein, 1884
- Discodermia claviformis Kieschnick, 1896
- Discodermia discifera (Lendenfeld, 1907)
- Discodermia discifurca Sollas, 1888
- Discodermia dissoluta Schmidt, 1880
- Discodermia dubia Vacelet & Vasseur, 1971
- Discodermia emarginata Dendy, 1905
- Discodermia gorgonoides Burton, 1928
- Discodermia inscripta (Schmidt, 1879)
- Discodermia interspersa Kumar, 1925
- Discodermia irregularis Hoshino, 1976
- Discodermia japonica Döderlein, 1884
- Discodermia jogashima Tanita & Hoshino, 1989
- Discodermia kellyae Carvalho & Xavier, 2020
- Discodermia kiiensis Hoshino, 1977
- Discodermia koreana Sim, 1982
- Discodermia laevidiscus Carter, 1880
- Discodermia natalensis Kirkpatrick, 1903
- Discodermia ornata Sollas, 1888
- Discodermia panoplia Sollas, 1888
- Discodermia papillata Carter, 1880
- Discodermia polydiscus (Bowerbank, 1869)
- Discodermia polymorpha Pisera & Vacelet, 2011
- Discodermia proliferans Lévi & Lévi, 1983
- Discodermia ramifera Topsent, 1892
- Discodermia sinuosa Carter, 1881
- Discodermia stylifera Keller, 1891
- Discodermia tuberosa Dendy, 1922
- Discodermia vermicularis Döderlein, 1884
- Discodermia verrucosa Topsent, 1928

== Pharmacology ==
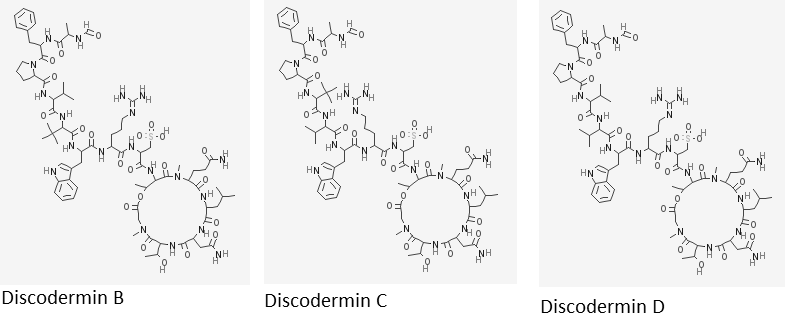
Discodermins B-D

D. dissoluta is of interest to bio and organic chemists because it produces (+)-discodermolide, a polyketide natural product with immunosuppressive and cancer killing properties.

Antimicrobial/anticancer peptides called discodermins have been isolated from D. kiiensis.
