= Kosan Biosciences =

Kosan Biosciences, Inc.
- Founded: 1995
- Headquarters: Hayward, California
- Key people: Helen S. Kim (President & CEO)
- Number of employees: 90
- Parent: Bristol Myers Squibb

Kosan Biosciences, Inc. (stock symbol: KOSN), was a pharmaceutical company which dealt with cancer therapeutics medications. The company was working on advancing two new classes of anticancer agents through clinical development: heat shock protein 90 (Hsp90) inhibitors and epothilones.

Their technology platform was based on manipulation of the genetic instructions of microbes for making natural product polyketides. Rearranging the modular units in natural polyketide synthases, combining modules from different enzymes, and incorporating novel synthetic chemical starter units enabled them to produce a wide variety of novel polyketides that would be difficult to obtain via organic synthesis alone.

Founded in 1995, Kosan was headquartered in Hayward, California and had approximately 90 employees. Kosan was funded in part as a venture capital start-up with funds from Sofinnova Ventures of California. Kosan was one of a small number of biotech companies focussed on polyketide drug discovery and development. Another was Biotica Technology Ltd..

On June 26, 2008, Kosan Biosciences was acquired by Bristol-Myers Squibb for $190M.

== Discodermolide ==
Discodermolide is a recently discovered polyketide natural product found to be a potent inhibitor of tumor cell growth. Kosan had been working in conjunction with the Amos B. Smith research group on a preclinical drug development program.

== Management ==
Helen S. Kim was the President & CEO of Kosan Biosciences in 2008 until it was sold to BMS. One member of the Board of Directors, Dr. Jean Deleage, was one of the founders and managing partners of Burr, Egan, Deleage & Co., a private venture capital firm which invested in information technology, communications, and healthcare/biotechnology companies.
