= Peter Klinken =

Australian medical researcher and Chief Scientist of Western Australia

Peter Klinken AC FAHMS FTSE
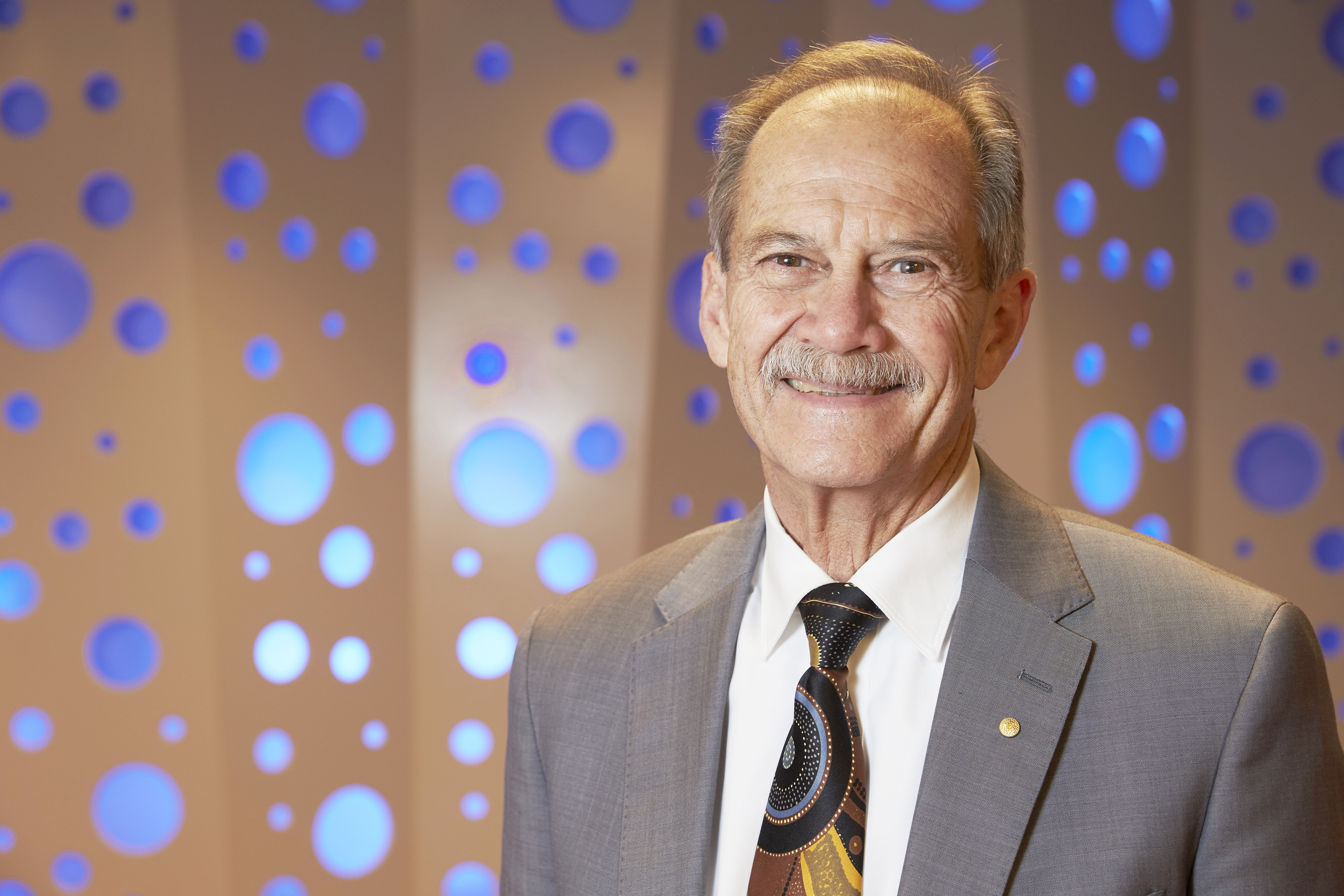
- Professor Peter Klinken in 2018

3rd Chief Scientist of Western Australia
- Incumbent
- Assumed office 10 June 2014
- Minister: Dave Kelly
- Preceded by: Lyn Beazley

Personal details
- Born: Svend Peter Klinken; 30 July 1953 (age 72) Singapore
- Education: Aquinas College, Perth
- Alma mater: University of Western Australia

Svend Peter Klinken (born 30 July 1953 in Singapore) is an Australian medical researcher and academic. He is currently the Chief Scientist of Western Australia. He was appointed a Companion of the Order of Australia (AC) in the June 2017 Queen's Birthday Honours.

== Early life and education ==
Born in Singapore, Klinken attended Aquinas College, Perth (Western Australia) from 1966 to 1970. In 1975 he obtained a Bachelor of Science (1st Class Honours) in Biochemistry from the University of Western Australia (UWA). He obtained a PhD in biochemistry and a Diploma of Education from UWA in 1982.

== Academic career ==
While writing his PhD thesis, Klinken taught at Scotch College, Perth (Western Australia) from 1981 to 1983. After being awarded his PhD, he received a fellowship from the Fogarty International Center at the US National Institutes of Health in Bethesda, Maryland (1984–1986). He then returned to Australia and worked as a post-doctoral fellow at the Walter and Eliza Hall Institute of Medical Research in Melbourne 1987–1988. In 1989, he returned to an academic position at UWA, where he received two "Excellence in Teaching" Awards. In 1994 he was appointed UWA Professor of Clinical Biochemistry based at the Royal Perth Hospital, and in 2000 he became director of research at the hospital.

Klinken's research interests include the regulation of red blood cell formation, and the ability of leukaemic cells to develop different features and functions. He has a long-standing interest in identifying genes, which when altered can cause leukaemia and other cancers. During his career on the genetic causes of cancer, his laboratory team identified two genes (Mlf1 and Hls5) implicated in the development of leukaemias and cancers. His team participated in the Japanese-led FANTOM5 international consortium that investigated cellular trancriptomics.

== Achievements ==
Klinken played a key role in establishing the Western Australian Institute for Medical Research (WAIMR) in 1998, which later became known as the Harry Perkins Institute of Medical Research. During his tenure as executive director from 2002 to 2014, the Institute grew from 63 to over 250 researchers and staff, and established a number of spin-off companies including Linear Clinical Research, an early phase-1 clinical trials facility. Under his stewardship, the Institute attracted world-class researchers to Western Australia and made numerous acclaimed medical discoveries. He also spearheaded the $200m development of state-of-the-art medical research facilities for the Harry Perkins Institute at the QEII Medical Centre and the Fiona Stanley Hospital.

In June 2014, the Premier of Western Australia appointed Klinken as the third Chief Scientist of the state. He currently reports directly to the Minister for Science, Dave Kelly, and provides independent, external advice on topics that are important to the future of science in the state. His advice includes broadening the state's economy through science and innovation, promoting Western Australia as a science leader nationally and internationally, and acting as an ambassador to raise the awareness of science in the community. He works closely with Science and Innovation in Western Australia to enhance collaboration, attract funding, build leading-edge scientific capability and promote science initiatives across Government, industry and academia. He was heavily involved with the Office of Science in the development of the state's "Science Statement", which identified five key sectors for scientific focus. He also played an important role in the development of the state's Science and Innovation Framework, released in 2018. In June 2017, Klinken has been reappointed as Chief Scientist until June 2019.

== Honours and recognitions ==
- 2002 – Paul Harris Fellow of The Rotary Foundation
- 2008 – Western Australian Citizen of the Year Award (CitWA)
- 2012 – Ernst and Young Social Entrepreneur of the Year
- 2015 – Fellow of the Australian Academy of Health and Medical Sciences (FAHMS)
- 2016 – Fellow of the Australian Academy of Technological Science and Engineering (FTSE)
- 2016 – Innovate Australia Award for outstanding contributions to Western Australian science, technology & innovation
- 2016 – Edith Cowan University (Kurongkurl Katitjin) Black Moon award for his contribution to the indigenous people of Western Australia
- 2016 – 100 most influential Western Australians (The West Australian)
- 2017 – Companion of the Order of Australia (AC)
- 2025 - Emeritus Professor (University of Western Australia)

== Professional responsibilities and engagements ==
Klinken has been a member of the Board of the Cancer Research Trust since 2009, and is on the Medical Research Advisory Committee of the Australian Cancer Research Foundation, as well as the Scientific Advisory Committee of the Children's Cancer Institute of Australia and the Lions Eye Institute. From 1992 to 2005 he provided support to the National Health and Medical Research Council (NHMRC) of Australia in a variety of roles, and served on the Council of Scotch College, Perth (2003–2008) as well as the Board of the Diabetes Research Foundation (2004–2008).

Klinken was Regional Editor of the International Journal of Biochemistry & Cell Biology (1994–2004) and was a member of the editorial board of Experimental Haematology (2000–2004). He was invited to be an inaugural member of the International Molecular Biology Network, and has participated in numerous institutional reviews.

== Research publications ==
1. Effect of inhibitors of Ornithine decarboxylase on retrovirus induced transformation of murine erythroid precursors in vitro. Cancer Res 46:6246–6429 (1986)
2. Evolution of B cell lineage lymphomas in mice with a retrovirus-induced immunodeficiency syndrome MAIDS. J Immunol 140:1123–1131 (1987)
3. Hemopoietic lineage conversion: v-raf oncogene converts Eμ-myc transgenic B cells into macrophages. Cell 53:857–867 (1988)
4. In vitro derived leukaemic erythroid cell lines induced by a raf/myc retrovirus differentiate in response to erythropoietin. Proc Natl Acad Sci USA 85:8506–8510 (1988)
5. v-cbl, a new oncogene from a dual-recombinant murine retrovirus that induced early B-lineage lymphomas. Proc Natl Acad Sci USA 86:1168–1172 (1989)
6. Transformation of murine bone marrow cells with a raf/myc retrovirus yields clonally related mature B cells and macrophages. Mol Cell Biol 10:3562–3568 (1990)
7. Novel zinc finger gene implicated as myc collaborator by retrovirally accelerated lymphoma genesis in Eμ-myc transgenic mice. Cell 65:1–10 (1991)
8. Erythropoietin-induced stimulation of differentiation and proliferation in J2E cells is not mimicked by chemical induction. Blood 80:412–419 (1992)
9. A rapid fatal erythroleukemia caused by J2E cells can be treated ex vivo with erythropoietin. Leukemia 9:900–907 (1995)
10. Lyn tyrosine kinase is essential for erythropoietin-induced differentiation of J2E erythroid cells. EMBO Journal 16:1610–1619 (1997)
11. HLS7, a hemopoietic lineage switch gene homologous to the leukaemia-inducing gene MLF1. EMBO Journal 18:5559–5566 (1999)
12. Maturation of erythroid cells and erythroleukemia development are affected by the kinase activity of Lyn. Cancer Res 61:2453–2458 (2001)
13. HLS5, a novel RBCC family member isolated from a hemopoietic lineage switch is a candidate tumour suppressor. J Biol Chem 279:8181–8189 (2004)
14. Myeloid Leukemia Factor 1 associates with a novel heterogeneous nuclear ribonucleoprotein U-like molecule. J Biol Chem 281:38791-38800 (2006)
15. Erythroid defects in TRa-/- mice. Blood 111: 3245–3248 (2008)
16. Hls5 regulates erythroid differentiation by modulating Gata-1 activity. Blood 111: 1946–1950 (2008)
17. Liar, a novel Lyn-binding nuclear/cytoplasmic shuttling protein that influences erythropoietin-induced differentiation. Blood 113: 3845–3856 (2009)
18. Gain-of-function Lyn induces anaemia: appropriate Lyn activity is essential for normal erythropoiesis and Epo receptor signalling. Blood 122: 262–271 (2013)
19. A promoter level expression atlas. Nature 507:462–470 (2014)
20. Complementing tissue characterisation by integrating transcriptome profiling from the Human Protein Atlas and from the FANTOM5 consortium'. NUCLEIC ACIDS RESEARCH, 43, pp. 6787–6798 (2015)
21. Transcriptional enhancers lead waves of co-ordinated transcription in transitioning mammalian cells. Science 347:1010–1014 (2015)
