= Calyculin =

Calyculins
- Calyculins A and C

Names
- IUPAC name ((2R,3R,5R,7R,8S,9S)-2-((1S,3S,4S,5R,6R,7E,9E,11E,13Z)-14-cyano-3,5-dihydroxy-1-methoxy-4,6,8,9,13-pentamethyltetradeca-7,9,11,13-tetraenyl)-9-((E)-3-(2-((2S)-4-(((2S,3S,4S)-4-(dimethylamino)-2,3-dihydroxy-5-methoxypentanoyl)amino)butan-2-yl)-1,3-oxazol-4-yl)prop-2-enyl)-7-hydroxy-4,4,8-trimethyl-1,10-dioxaspiro(4.5)decan-3-yl) dihydrogen phosphate (Calyculin A)

Identifiers
| CAS Number | 101932-71-2 (Calyculin A) |
| ChEBI | CHEBI:41791 (Calyculin A) |
| ChEMBL | ChEMBL384277 |
| ChemSpider | 9084513 (Calyculin A) |
| PubChem CID | 10909255 (Calyculin A) |
| UNII | 7D07U14TK3 (Calyculin A) |
- InChI: InChI=1S/C50H81N4O15P/c1-29(20-22-51)16-14-17-30(2)32(4)24-33(5)42(57)35(7)38(55)25-41(65-13)45-46(69-70(61,62)63)49(8,9)50(68-45)26-39(56)34(6)40(67-50)19-15-18-36-27-66-48(53-36)31(3)21-23-52-47(60)44(59)43(58)37(28-64-12)54(10)11/h14-18,20,24,27,31,33-35,37-46,55-59H,19,21,23,25-26,28H2,1-13H3,(H,52,60)(H2,61,62,63)/b16-14+,18-15+,29-20-,30-17+,32-24+/t31-,33+,34-,35-,37-,38-,39+,40-,41-,42+,43-,44-,45+,46-,50+/m1/s1 Key: FKAWLXNLHHIHLA-LIKMAGLISA-N

Properties
| Chemical formula | C_{51}H_{83}N_{4}O_{15}P (Calyculin C) |
| Molar mass | 1023.2 g/mol (Calyculin C) |

Properties
| Chemical formula | C_{50}H_{81}N_{4}O_{15}P (Calyculin A) |
| Molar mass | 1009.17 g/mol (Calyculin A) |
- Except where otherwise noted, data are given for materials in their standard state (at 25 °C [77 °F], 100 kPa). verify (what is ?) Infobox references

Calyculins are natural products originally isolated from the marine sponge Discodermia calyx. Calyculins have proven to be strong serine/threonine protein phosphatase inhibitors and based on this property, calyculins might be potential tumor-promoting agents.

A laboratory synthesis of calyculin A has been reported.

== Biosynthesis ==
Calyculin A is biosynthesized as a pyrophosphate containing phosphocalyculin A protoxins by a hybrid PKS-NRPS pathway within the sponge bacterial symbiont, "Candidatus Entotheonella" sp.
