= Manihinea =

Scientific classification
- Domain: Eukaryota
- Kingdom: Animalia
- Phylum: Porifera
- Class: Demospongiae
- Order: Tetractinellida
- Family: Theonellidae
- Genus: Manihinea; Pulitzer-Finali, 1993

Type species
- Manihinea conferta Pulitzer-Finali, 1993

Genus of sponges

Manihinea is a genus of deep-water sea sponge in the Theonellidae family, first described by Gustavo Pulitzer-Finali in 1993. The generic description was emended in 2002 by Pisera and Lévi.

== Species ==
The following species are accepted within Manihinea:

- Manihinea conferta Pulitzer-Finali, 1993
- Manihinea lynbeazleyae Fromont & Pisera, 2011
