= Chief Scientist of Western Australia =

The Chief Scientist of Western Australia is an independent adviser to the Government of Western Australia on science and innovation within Western Australia. The Chief Scientist also advises on science in the economy, the development of scientific industries, and promoting the state's scientific leadership internationally within the Asia-Pacific region.

== Role ==
The Chief Scientist advises the government, particularly the premier and the Minister for Science, on scientific matters, and on a strategic direction for science in Western Australia.

The Chief Scientist reports to the Minister for Science, and works with the Science and Innovation division of the Department of Energy and Economic Diversification. The role also involves the encouragement of collaboration at local, national and internal levels; advocating for scientific investment from industry and the federal government; advocating for policies and initiatives throughout government and the community; and acting as a public ambassador.

Government ministers or bureaucrats may ask the Chief Scientist for scientific information on subjects related to their portfolios, such as radio astronomy, the Peel-Harvey inlet, or supercomputers. The Chief Scientist consults with experts on the subject, and present a briefing on the matter. The Chief Scientist may also approach government with their own concerns or ideas.

While in the role, Chief Scientists can continue their scientific endeavours, in local laboratories or in other parts of the world such as Nevada and South Africa.

== History ==
The position was created in 2003, with the inaugural appointment of Bruce Hobbs. Hobbs resigned in May 2006 over a difference in opinion regarding government funding. The second, Lyn Beazley, was the first woman to be appointed as a chief scientist in Australia. The third appointment was Peter Klinken in 2014. All three appointees were researchers and professors at the University of Western Australia. The fourth and current Chief Scientist is Professor Sharath Sriram appointed in 2025.

== Chief Scientists ==
There have been four Chief Scientists of Western Australia:

No	Name	Start date	End date
1	Bruce Hobbs	2003	May 2006
2	Lyn Beazley	December 2006	December 2013
3	Peter Klinken	10 June 2014	June 2025
4	Sharath Sriram	3 June 2025	Current

== See also ==
- Office of the Chief Scientist (Australia)
- Chief Scientist of South Australia
