= Discodermia dissoluta =

Scientific classification
- Kingdom: Animalia
- Phylum: Porifera
- Class: Demospongiae
- Order: Tetractinellida
- Family: Theonellidae
- Genus: Discodermia
- Species: D. dissoluta

Binomial name
- Discodermia dissoluta (Schmidt, 1880)

Synonyms
- Desmahabana violacea Alcolado & Gotera, 1986

Species of sponge

Discodermia dissoluta is a deep-water sea sponge found in the Eastern, Southern, and Southwestern Caribbean, and in the Greater Antilles.

D. dissoluta is of interest to bio and organic chemists because it produces (+)-discodermolide, a polyketide natural product with immunosuppressive and cancer killing properties.
