= Bruce Edward Hobbs =

Australian geologist

Bruce Edward Hobbs (born 23 October 1936) is an Australian structural geologist and science administrator. He is a research fellow of the Commonwealth Scientific and Industrial Research Organisation and adjunct professor, University of Western Australia. He was elected a Fellow of the Australian Academy of Science in 1991. He was appointed the first Chief Scientist of Western Australia in 2003 but resigned over fundamental differences with the Carpenter Government in 2006.

Hobbs has popularly defined structural geology as the study of "the way in which rocks get buried and deformed and metamorphosed." Hobbs has described his research career as moving "from being very fine-scale, like microscopic or even electron microscopic, to the much larger scale of almost the whole Earth now, trying to understand what goes on within the Earth." His latter interest has been described as "developing computer applications that simulate mechanical behaviour, fluid flow, heat flow and chemical reactions governing ore body formation. The goal is to produce a predictive modelling capability that enhances our ability to discover new ore bodies."

== Early life and education ==
Bruce Edward Hobbs was born 23 October 1936 in Sydney.

He completed his secondary schooling at Newcastle Boys High School.

He matriculated to the University of Sydney. He was graduated a Bachelor of Science in 1959. He presented his research thesis, Tectonic studies in the Central West of N.S.W. and was awarded his PhD in Science in 1964.

== Academic career ==
Hobbs lectured in geology at the University of Sydney first as lecturer (1960 – 66) then as senior lecturer (1967).

Between 1965 and 1967 he was Research Geologist at the Institute of Geophysics and Planetary Physics at the University of California.

He was a research Fellow in the Department of Geology and Geophysics, Australian National University, Canberra (1967 – 71).

Between 1971 and 1972 he was Professor of Structural Geology, State University of New York.

He returned to Australia to be the Foundation Professor of Geology and chair of the Department of Earth Sciences, Monash University (1972 – 84).

He was a Member of the Australian Science and Technology Council (1977 – 1982).

He spent fourteen months as visiting professor at Brown University in Rhode Island (1978 – 1979) and won a Fulbright Award in 1979 and spent six months as visiting professor at the University of California, Davis.

He left full-time work as an academic to join the CSIRO in 1984 but, in 1987, accepted an offer of Honorary Research Associate at Monash University.

== CSIRO ==
Hobbs joined the Commonwealth Scientific and Industrial Research Organisation (CSIRO) in 1984. He was Chief Research Scientist in the Division of Geomechanics (1984 – 1987) then being promoted to chief of the division in 1987.

He moved to the Exploration Geoscience Division in 1992. He became Chief of CSIRO Exploration and Mining (1993 – 2000).

In 2000 he became Deputy Chief Executive of CSIRO and retired in 2002.

== Chief scientist, Western Australia ==
In 2003, the Government of Western Australia created a position of Chief Scientist within the Department of premier and Cabinet and Hobbs was appointed, the first to hold the post. He was also executive director of Office Science and Innovation.

The position was moved to the Environment portfolio and in 2006 to Industry and Resources Department. Shortly after, Hobbs resigned citing fundamental differences with the government over the direction of policy. He was reported as saying that he believed research funds should be used to support and develop mining and agriculture but the Government wanted to find new technologies such as biofuels and IT to replace natural resources when they run out.

== Awards and honours ==
In 1967, he received the Stillwell Award from the Geological Society of Australia.

In 1970, he was awarded the United States Antarctic Research Program Medal.

In 1979, he won a Fulbright Award and he was visiting professor, University of California for six months between 1980 and 1981.

In 1991, he was elected a Fellow of the Australian Academy of Science.

In 2001, the Australian Academy of Science awarded him the Jaeger Medal.

In 2003, he was awarded a Centenary Medal.

On 8 June 2009, he was made an Officer of the Order of Australia for "service to science, particularly in the field of structural geology as a leader in the development of innovative research centres and mineral exploration technologies."

== Personal life ==
On 26 August 1960 Hobbs married Robyn Savage. They have two sons and two daughters.
