= TERN =

The Terrestrial Ecosystem Research Network, or TERN by its acronym, is a research network that enables coordinated work across private research centres and Australian government agencies. TERN has also been described as "Australia’s terrestrial ecosystem observatory": it provides empirical data to Australian and foreign institutions. As of 2021, TERN boasted that its infrastructure has been instrumental in the publication of over 1,000 academic articles. NASA says it has used TERN data.

At launch in 2009, its funding included $55 million from the Australian government and $4 million in Queensland government funding. The partners include the University of Queensland, the Queensland University of Technology, Griffith University, CSIRO, the Queensland Department of Environment & Resource Management, and the University of Adelaide, all of which direct TERN.

As of 2021, TERN was funded by NCRIS, an Australian government initiative. TERN itself funds research infrastructure and data collection.

== Infrastructure ==
TERN operates over 700 sites across Australia. As of 2013, TERN had installed 20 flux towers. The Daintree Rainforest Observatory (DRO), in Cape Tribulation, is monitored by TERN.

TERN provides three ranges of infrastructure: environmental monitoring at continental scale, a large collection of research plots, and a more limited collection of intensively monitored sites.
