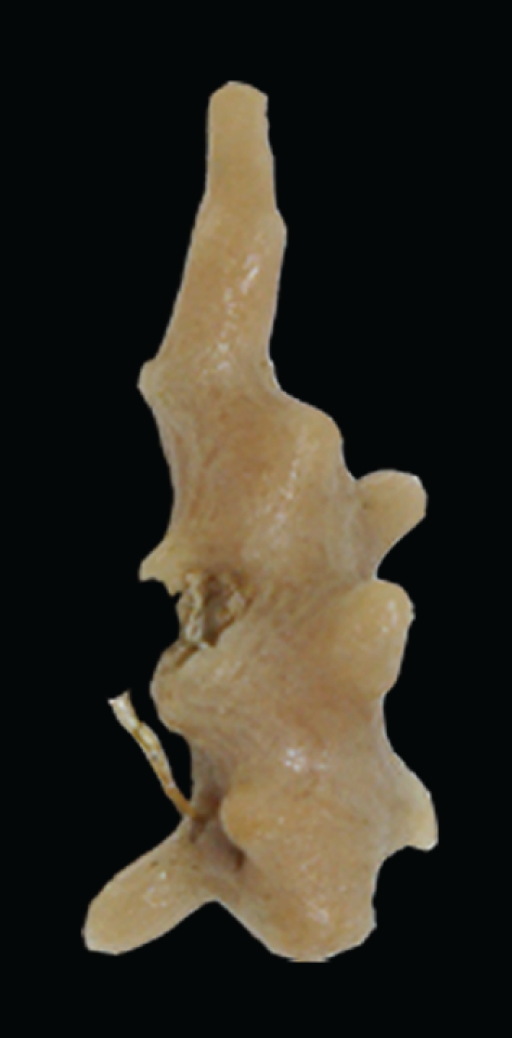
- Discodermia ramifera

Scientific classification
- Kingdom: Animalia
- Phylum: Porifera
- Class: Demospongiae
- Order: Tetractinellida
- Suborder: Astrophorina
- Family: Theonellidae; Lendenfeld, 1903

= Theonellidae =

Family of sponges

Theonellidae is a family of sponges belonging to the order Tetractinellida, which was first described by Robert von Lendenfeld in 1903.

Theonella conica is known for hyperaccumulation of molybdenum due to the action of an endosymbiont microbe, Entotheonella sp.

== Genera ==
- Colossolacis Schrammen, 1910
- Dactylocalcites
- Discodermia du Bocage, 1869
- Manihinea Pulitzer-Finali, 1993
- Racodiscula Zittel, 1878
- Siliquariaspongia Hoshino, 1981
- Theonella Gray, 1868
