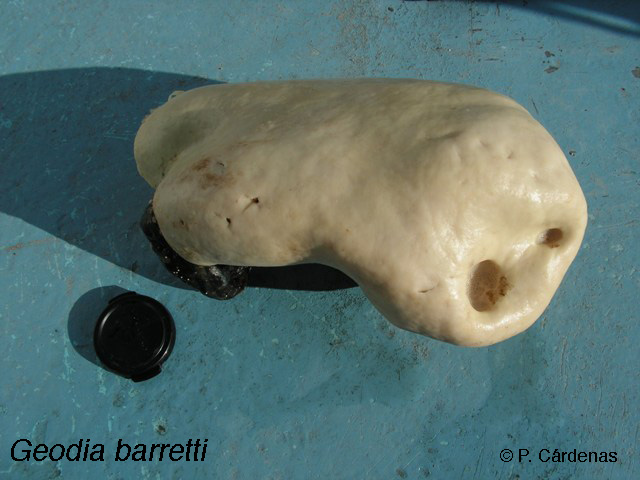
- Geodia barretti

Scientific classification
- Kingdom: Animalia
- Phylum: Porifera
- Class: Demospongiae
- Order: Tetractinellida
- Suborder: Astrophorina; Sollas, 1887

Families
- Ancorinidae Schmidt, 1870; Calthropellidae Lendenfeld, 1907; Corallistidae Sollas, 1888; Geodiidae Gray, 1867; Isoraphiniidae Schrammen, 1924; Macandrewiidae Schrammen, 1924; Neopeltidae Sollas, 1888; Pachastrellidae Carter, 1875; Phymaraphiniidae Schrammen, 1924; Phymatellidae Schrammen, 1910; Pleromidae Sollas, 1888; Theneidae Carter, 1883; Theonellidae Lendenfeld, 1903; Thrombidae Sollas, 1888; Vulcanellidae Cárdenas, Xavier, Reveillaud, Schander & Rapp, 2011

Synonyms
- Astrophorida Sollas, 1887

= Astrophorina =

Suborder of sea sponges

Astrophorina is a suborder of sea sponges in the class Demospongiae. Astrophorina was formerly named Astrophorida and classified as an order, but it is now recognised as a suborder of Tetractinellida

== Bibliography ==
- "Astrophorida". Integrated Taxonomic Information System.
- Morrow & Cárdenas' (2015) revision of the higher taxa of the Demospongiae, Astrophorida sensu Lévi, 1973 (and sensu Hooper & Van Soest, 2002)
