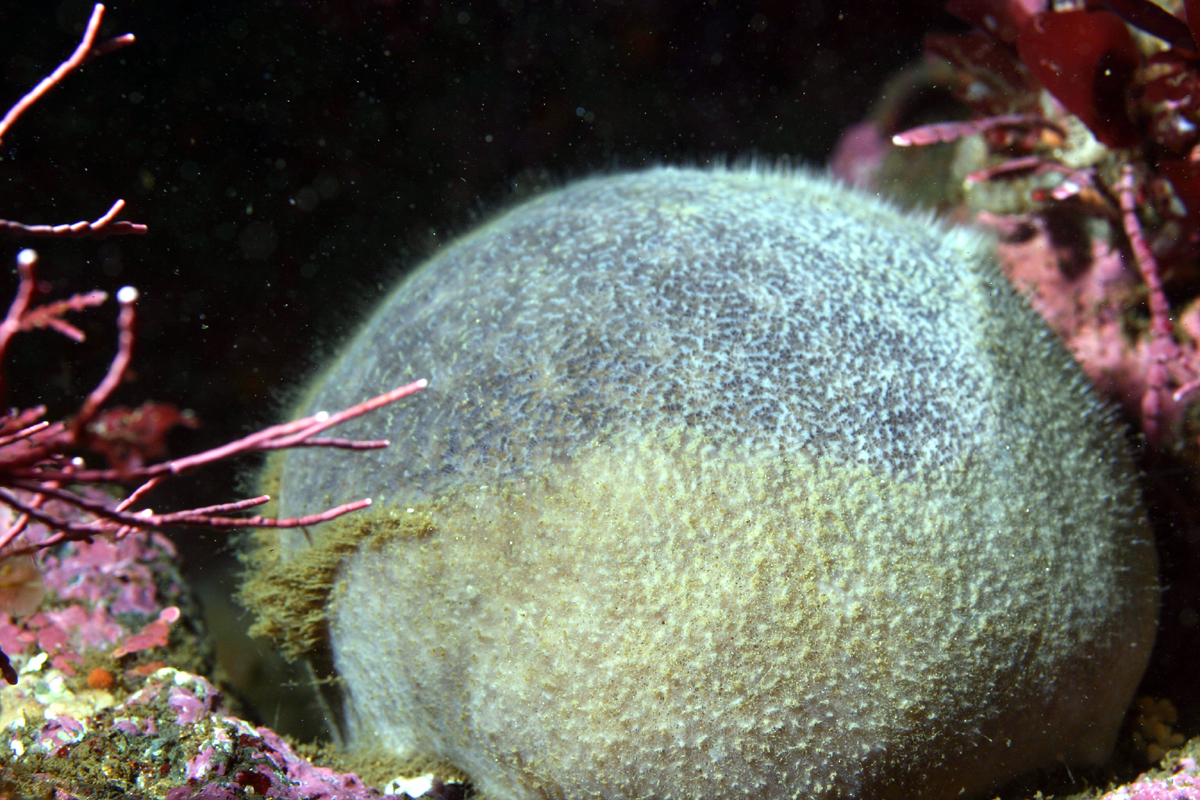

Scientific classification
- Domain: Eukaryota
- Kingdom: Animalia
- Phylum: Porifera
- Class: Demospongiae
- Order: Tetractinellida
- Suborder: Spirophorina; Bergquist & Hogg, 1969

Families
- Azoricidae Sollas, 1888; Samidae Sollas, 1888; Scleritodermidae Sollas, 1888; Siphonidiidae Lendenfeld, 1903; Spirasigmidae Hallmann, 1912; Stupendidae Kelly & Cárdenas, 2016; Tetillidae Sollas, 1886

Synonyms
- Spirophorida Bergquist & Hogg, 1969

= Spirophorina =

Suborder of sponges

Spirophorina is a suborder of sea sponges belonging to the class Demospongiae.

== Bibliography ==
- "Spirophorida". Integrated Taxonomic Information System.
