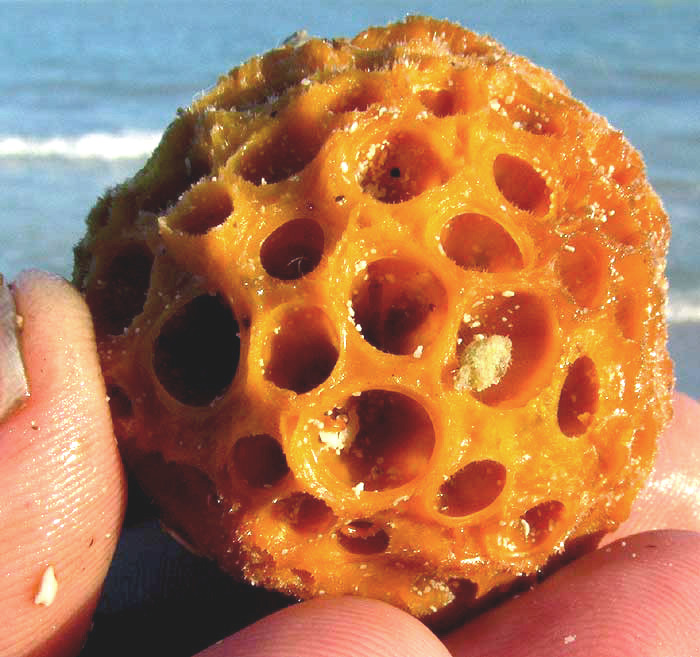
- Cinachyrella alloclada, skeleton washed onto beach

Scientific classification
- Kingdom: Animalia
- Phylum: Porifera
- Class: Demospongiae
- Order: Tetractinellida
- Family: Tetillidae
- Genus: Cinachyrella
- Species: C. alloclada

Binomial name
- Cinachyrella alloclada Uliczka, 1929

Synonyms
- Cinachyra alloclada Uliczka, 1929; Trachygellius cinachyra Laubenfels, 1936

= Cinachyrella alloclada =

Species of sponge

Cinachyrella alloclada, the yellow moon sponge or orange ball sponge, is a species of sponge occurring in the western Atlantic Ocean.

== Description ==
The bright orange, spherical item pictured on this page is the skeleton of a dead sponge, Cinachyrella alloclada, washed onto a beach. The skeleton consists of spongin, a type of collagen protein fiber, and spicules made of silica; the living tissue has decayed and washed away.

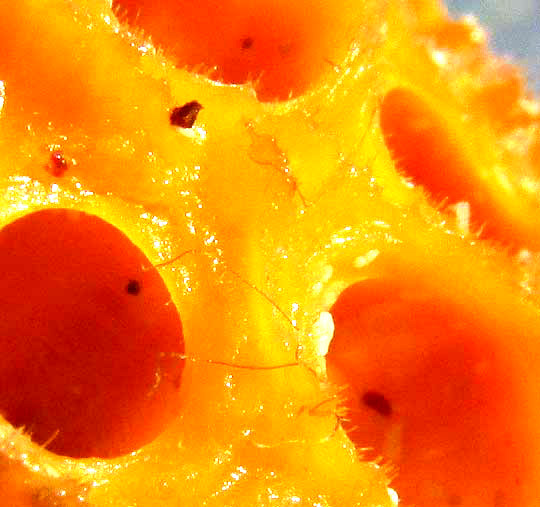
Cinachyrella alloclada, close-up of skeleton with needlelike spicules visible

When alive, the sponge displays these features:

- It's bright yellow to orange.
- Usually it's spherical in shape, up to about 10 cm in diameter (~4 inches), but in turbulent waters can be hemispheric, and pear-shaped in quiet water with much sedimentation.
- Its surface is rough and strongly prickly with needlelike spicules visible to the naked eye.
- It's covered with sunken, pore-like pits known as "porocalyces" (singular porocalyx) which are up to 1.5 cm wide (~¼ inch).
- It's slightly compressible but otherwise very firm in consistency.

== Distribution ==
In the western Atlantic, Cinachyrella alloclada occurs as far north as the coast of North Carolina in the US, as well as in the Gulf of Mexico, the Caribbean and Brazil.

== Habitat ==
Cinachyrella alloclada inhabits the lower intertidal zone of areas protected by breakwaters on rocks and in crevices, where it coexists with seaweed, or macroalgae. Images of the dead framework on this page were taken on a beach beside a canal cut through a spit separating the Gulf of Mexico from an estuary in Mexico. The species lives at depths of 3–80 meters (~3 to 260 feet).

All Cinacheyrella species are characterized as hosting an abundance of microbial lifeforms.

== Life cycle ==
Cinachyrella alloclada can reproduce via viviparous propagation or asexually at irregular times, and responding to unknown influences. During its viviparous propagation its zygotes develop into free-swimming larvae which settle onto a substrate where it grows into a young sponge.

== Taxonomy ==
Cinachyrella alloclada is similar to Cinachyrella apion and the species inhabit similar environments and overlap in distribution areas. It's reported that to differentiate them it's necessary to review their spicules and dimension; C. alloclada has two forms of spicules, while C. apion has only one, lacking the curved and smooth kind.

== Etymology ==
The genus name Cinachyrella was chosen because the genus was erected to accommodate species previously residing in the genus Cynachyra, as stated by H.V. Wilson ("Cynachyra part Lendenfeld, 1903. p. 26") when Cinachyrella was erected as a subgenus in 1925. However, his writing of the name Cynachyra appears to be a misspelling of the accepted genus name Cinachyra. The name Cinachyra was based on the Greek word χιν-αχυρα, said to be "...a kind of bag or sieve for bolting {sifting} flour," which is analogous enough to how sponges filter water.

In the species name alloclada, the allo- in Greek means "other". The -clada derives from the Greek kládos meaning "branch, sprig, frond", so we have "other branching". This well may refer to this species' two kinds of spicules, as described above.
