= Craniella elegans =

Scientific classification
- Kingdom: Animalia
- Phylum: Porifera
- Class: Demospongiae
- Order: Tetractinellida
- Family: Tetillidae
- Genus: Craniella
- Species: C. elegans

Binomial name
- Craniella elegans Dendy, 1905

Species of sponge

Craniella elegans is a species of marine sponges in the family Tetillidae. The type locality is between southern India and Sri Lanka (Gulf of Mannar).
