= Cinachyra antarctica =

Scientific classification
- Domain: Eukaryota
- Kingdom: Animalia
- Phylum: Porifera
- Class: Demospongiae
- Order: Tetractinellida
- Family: Tetillidae
- Genus: Cinachyra
- Species: C. antarctica

Binomial name
- Cinachyra antarctica (Carter, 1872)

Synonyms
- List: Tethya antarctica Carter, 1872; Cinachyra vertex Lendenfeld, 1907; Cinachyra antarctica monticularis Kirkpatrick, 1908; Cinachyra vertex monticularis Kirkpatrick, 1908

Species of sponge

Cinachyra antarctica is a species of antarctic sponge belonging to the family Tetillidae. It was first described by H.J. Carter in 1872. A 2002 study in Antarctica calculated that this sponge and another antarctic sponge, Anoxycalyx joubini, have amazingly long lifespans surpassing 1,550 years in C. antarctica and 15,000 years in A. joubini. A. joubini lives in deeper waters than C. antarctica. Antarctic sponges have such lifespans, probably because of their surroundings, living at 100–2,000 m (330–6,560 ft) below the surface, at extremely cold temperature and constant pressure. This may slow down their growth rate and other biological processes. Their growth rate may remain extremely slow over their remarkable lifespans as a result, as in a caught specimen of A. joubini (which barely measures more than 2 cm) which did not show any growth in a span of 10 years. C. antarctica lives at the bottom, as a benthic, sessile creature. Complete specimens have large, visible pores and an overall yellowish appearance with hair-like structures covering some parts next to the pores, giving it the look of a giant virus. Caught specimens are usually incomplete and rarely measure more than 2.5–3 cm.
