= Pachastrella cribrum =

Scientific classification
- Kingdom: Animalia
- Phylum: Porifera
- Class: Demospongiae
- Order: Tetractinellida
- Family: Pachastrellidae
- Genus: Pachastrella
- Species: P. cribrum

Binomial name
- Pachastrella cribrum Lebwohl, 1914

Species of sponge

Pachastrella cribrum is a species of sponge belonging to the family Pachastrellidae, that was first described in 1914 by Friedrich Lebwohl.

It is found in both South Korea (on Jeju Island, Geomun Island, Yeoseodo Island, and Namhyeongje Island) and Japan, on Eno Island.

This sponge is usually yellow, but sometimes ia beige or a light brown. It attaches to rocks at depths from 20 to 50 m.
