= Nethea =

Scientific classification
- Kingdom: Animalia
- Phylum: Porifera
- Class: Demospongiae
- Order: Tetractinellida
- Family: Pachastrellidae
- Genus: Nethea; Sollas, 1888

Genus of sponges

Nethea is a genus of sponges belonging to the family Pachastrellidae, that was first described in 1888 by William Johnson Sollas.

The species of this genus are found in Southern Europe.

Species:

- Nethea amygdaloides (Carter, 1876)
- Nethea nana (Carter, 1880)
