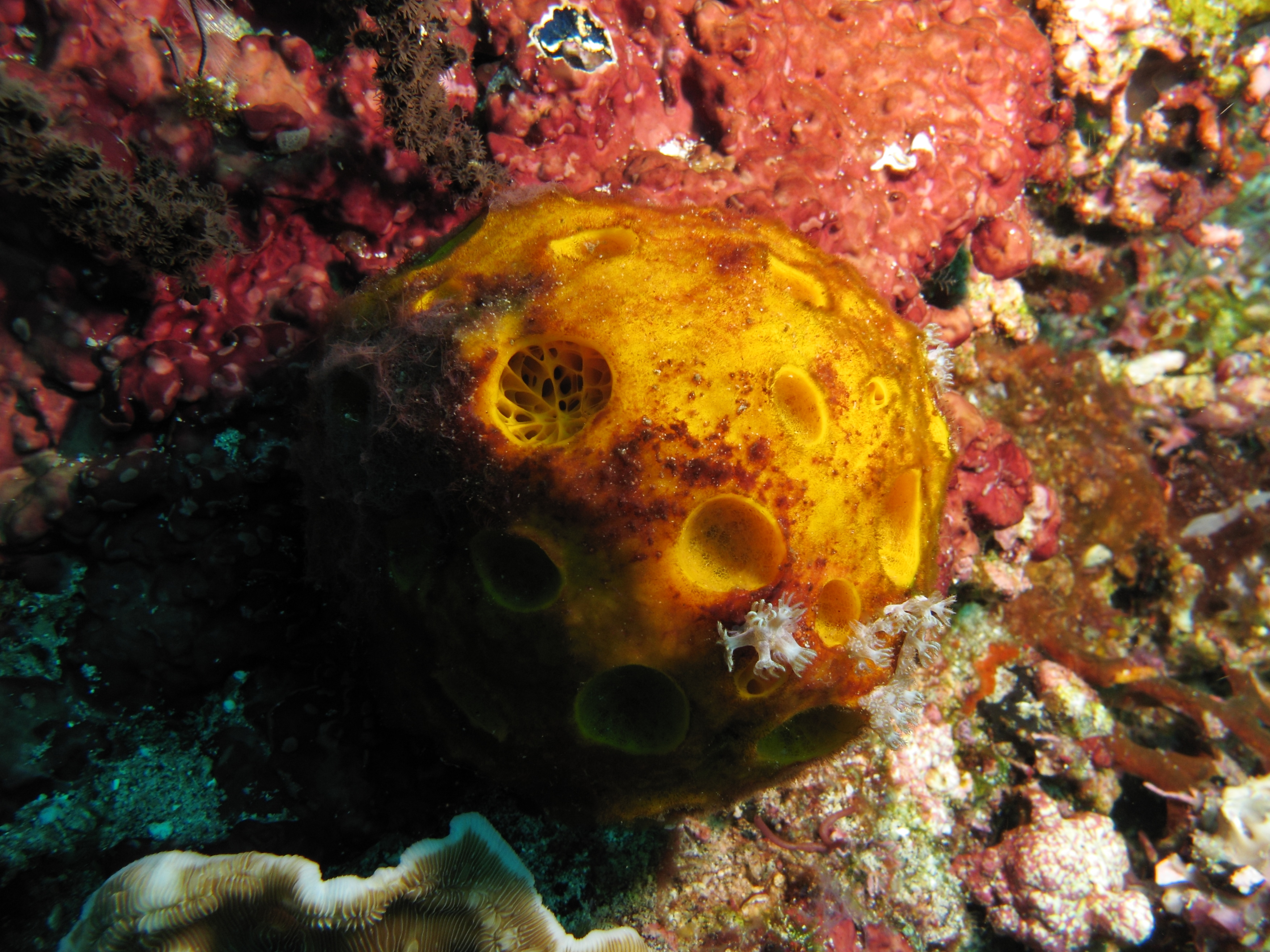
- Cinachyrella sp.

Scientific classification
- Kingdom: Animalia
- Phylum: Porifera
- Class: Demospongiae
- Order: Tetractinellida
- Family: Tetillidae
- Genus: Cinachyrella; Wilson, 1925

Synonyms
- List: Psetalia Gray, 1873; Raphidotethya Burton, 1934; Spiretta Lendenfeld, 1888; Tetilla (Cinachyrella) Wilson, 1925; Uliczka Laubenfels, 1936

= Cinachyrella =

Genus of sponges

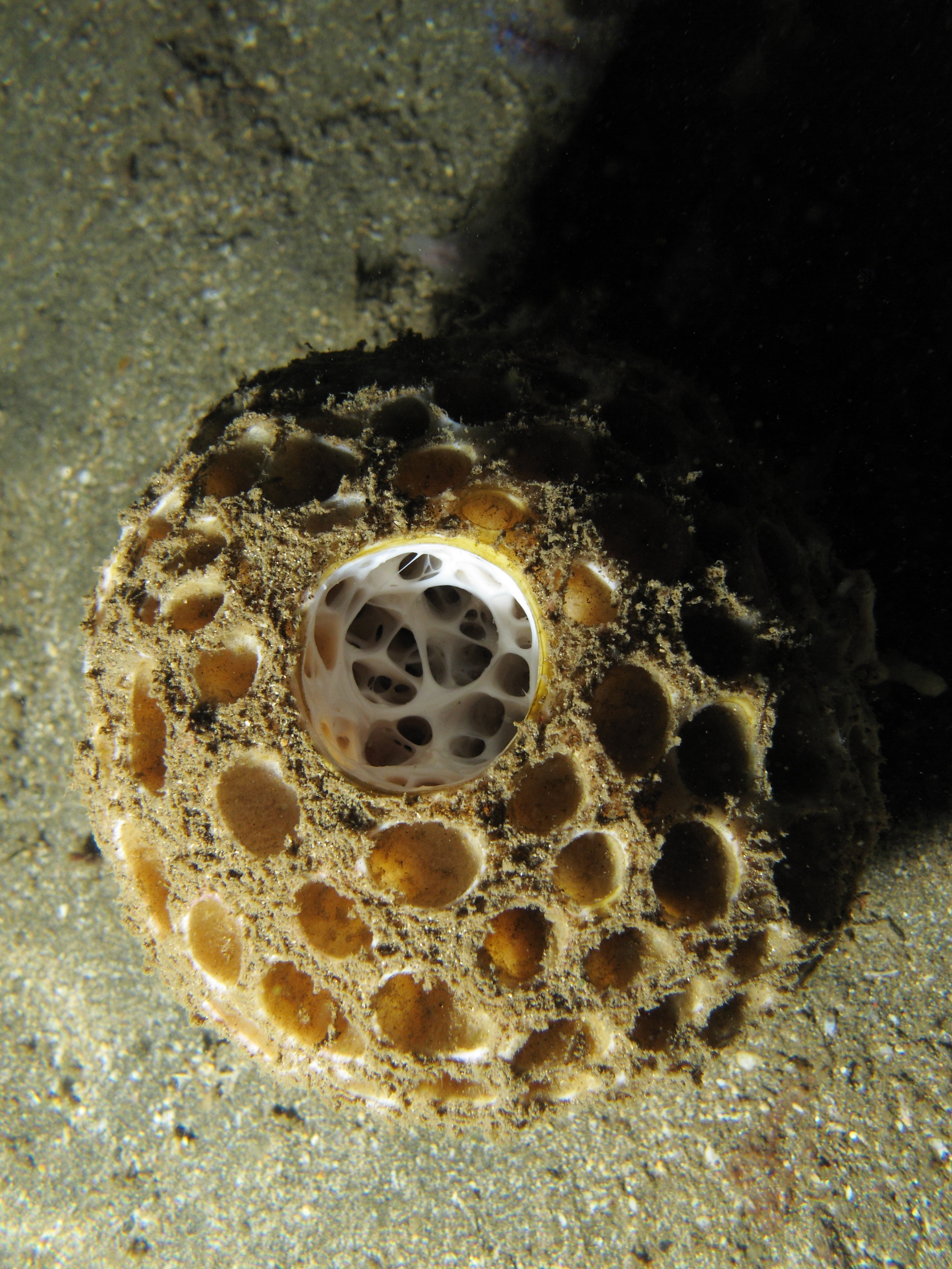
Cinachyrella sp.

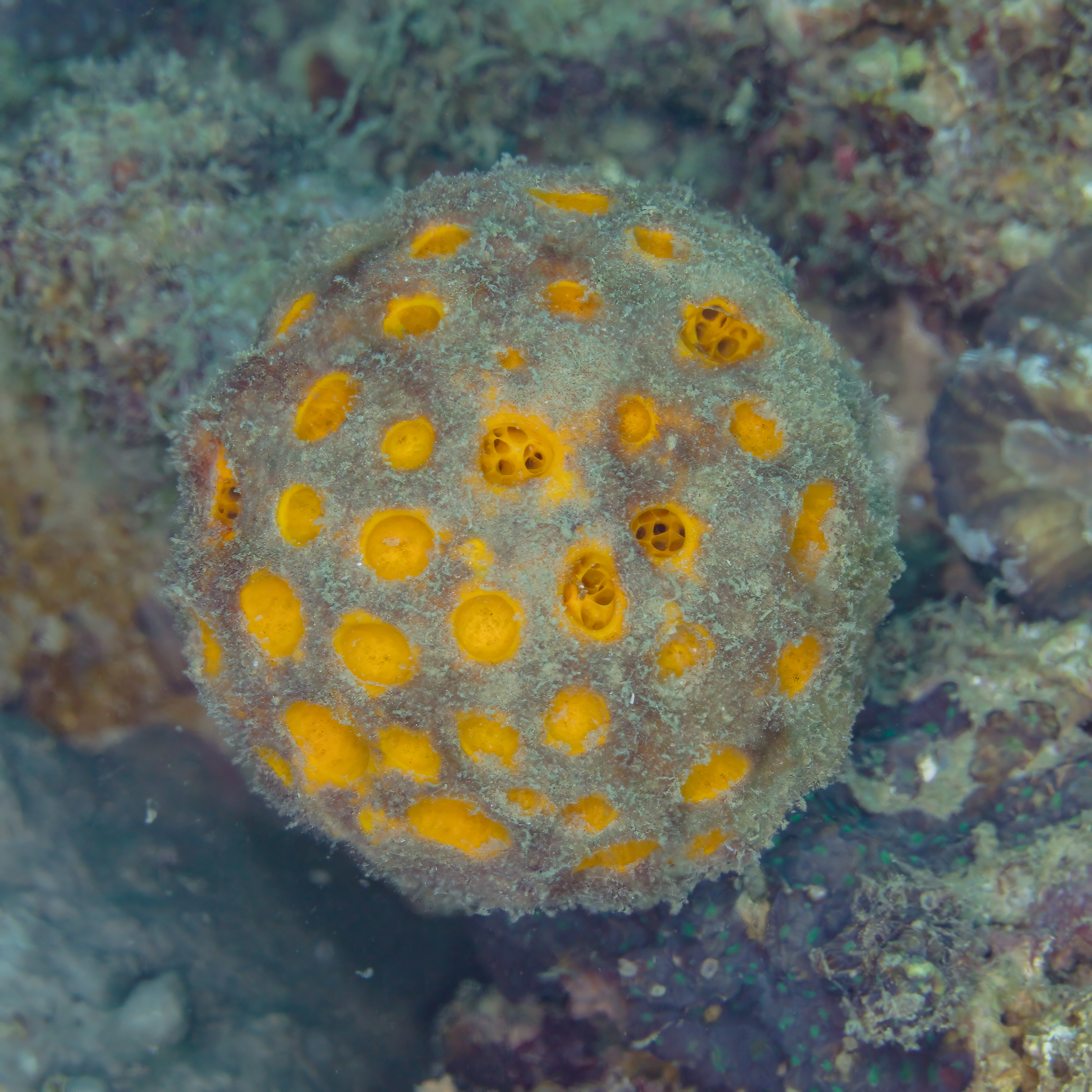
Cinachyra australiensis

Cinachyrella is a genus of marine sponges in the family Tetillidae. A number of Cinachyra species have been moved into Cinachyrella.

== Species ==
The following species are recognised in the genus Cinachyrella:

- Cinachyrella albabidens Lendenfeld, 1907
- Cinachyrella albaobtusa Lendenfeld, 1907
- Cinachyrella albatridens Lendenfeld, 1907
- Cinachyrella alloclada Uliczka, 1929
- Cinachyrella anatriaenilla Fernandez, Kelly & Bell, 2017
- Cinachyrella anomala Dendy, 1905
- Cinachyrella apion Uliczka, 1929
- Cinachyrella arabica Carter, 1869
- Cinachyrella arenosa van Soest & Stentoft, 1988
- Cinachyrella australiensis Carter, 1886
- Cinachyrella australis Lendenfeld, 1888
- Cinachyrella cavernosa Lamarck, 1815
- Cinachyrella cavernosa sensu Burton, 1959
- Cinachyrella clavaeformis Fernandez, Rodriguez, Santos, Pinheiro & Muricy, 2018
- Cinachyrella clavigera Hentschel, 1912
- Cinachyrella crustata Wilson, 1925
- Cinachyrella desqueyrouxae Van Soest & Hooper, 2020
- Cinachyrella enigmatica Burton, 1934
- Cinachyrella eurystoma Keller, 1891
- Cinachyrella globulosa Gray, 1873
- Cinachyrella hamata Lendenfeld, 1907
- Cinachyrella hirsuta Dendy, 1889
- Cinachyrella ibis Row, 1911
- Cinachyrella kuekenthali Uliczka, 1929
- Cinachyrella lacerata Bösraug, 1913
- Cinachyrella levantinensis Vacelet, Bitar, Carteron, Zibrowius & Perez, 2007
- Cinachyrella macellata Sollas, 1886
- Cinachyrella malaccensis (Sollas, 1902)
- Cinachyrella mertoni Hentschel, 1912
- Cinachyrella minuta Wilson, 1902
- Cinachyrella novaezealandiae Brøndsted, 1924
- Cinachyrella nuda Hentschel, 1912
- Cinachyrella paterifera Wilson, 1925
- Cinachyrella phacoides Hentschel, 1911
- Cinachyrella porosa (Lendenfeld, 1888)
- Cinachyrella robusta Carter, 1887
- Cinachyrella schulzei Keller, 1891
- Cinachyrella strongylophora Fernandez, Rodriguez, Santos, Pinheiro & Muricy, 2018
- Cinachyrella tarentina Pulitzer-Finali, 1983
- Cinachyrella tenuiviolacea Pulitzer-Finali, 1982
- Cinachyrella trochiformis Keller, 1891
- Cinachyrella unjinensis Shim & Sim, 2010
- Cinachyrella uteoides Dendy, 1924
- Cinachyrella vaccinata Dendy, 1922
