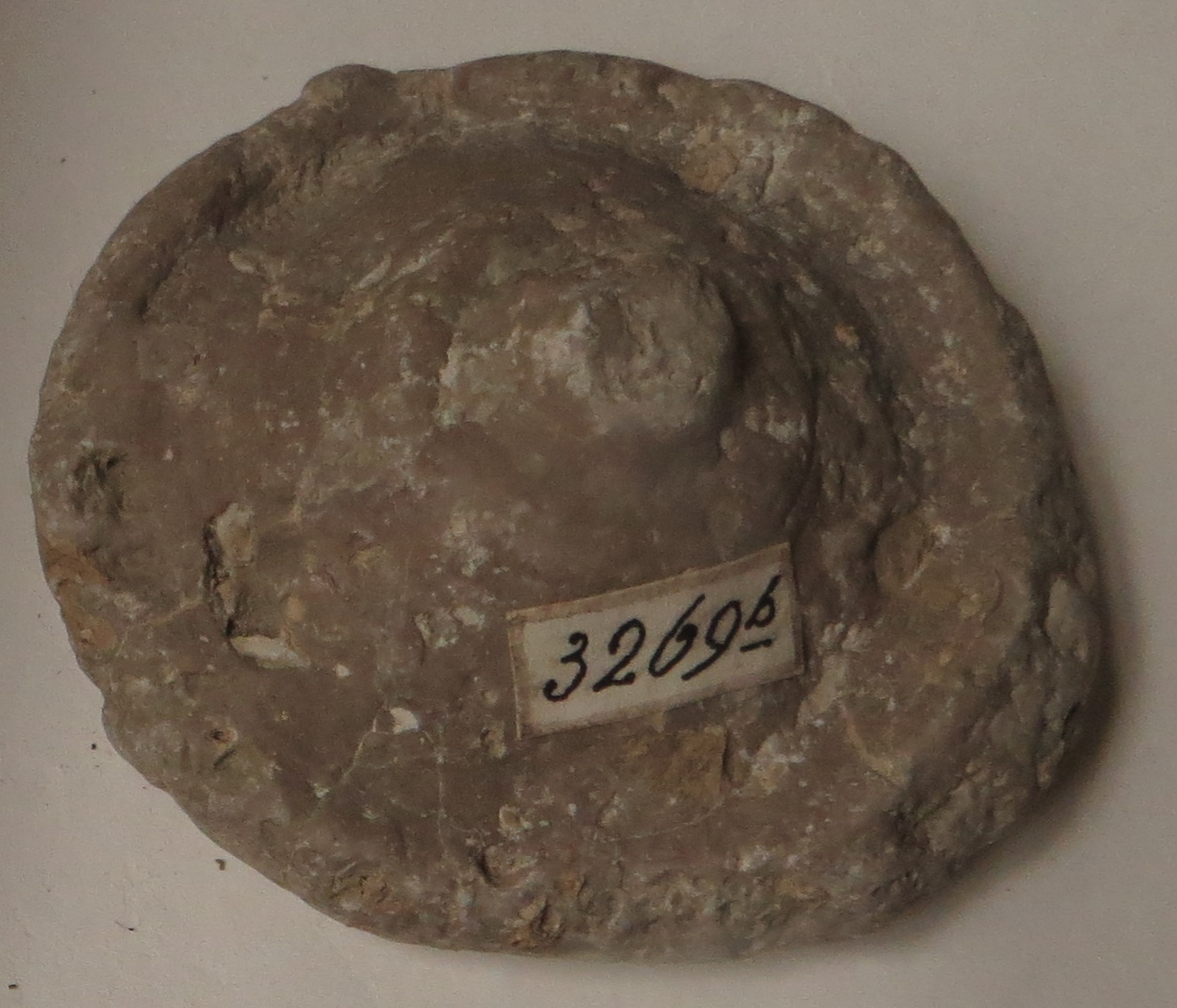
- Cupulospongia patella, picture at Teylers Museum, Haarlem

Scientific classification
- Kingdom: Animalia
- Phylum: Porifera
- Class: Demospongiae
- Order: Tetractinellida
- Genus: †Cupulospongia d'Orbigny, 1849

Species
- Several, including: †Cupulospongia acetabulum (Goldfuss); †Cupulospongia aptiensis d'Orbigny, 1850; †Cupulospongia boletiformis d'Orbigny; †Cupulospongia compressa d'Orbigny, 1850; †Cupulospongia consobrina d'Orbigny, 1850; †Cupulospongia elegans (d'Orbigny, 1849); †Cupulospongia patella; †Cupulospongia rimosa Roemer, 1864; †Cupulospongia tenuis Roemer, 1864

= Cupulospongia =

Cupulospongia Temporal range: Senonian

Extinct genus of sponges

Cupulospongia is an extinct genus of sea sponges from the Cretaceous of France.

C. elegans is vase shaped with a stout stalk. It is known from the sponge beds at Barrou, France.

The taxonomic position of the genus is unclear. Cupulospongia rimosa Roemer, 1864 is classified in Theonellidae while Cupulospongia tenuis Roemer, 1864 is in Azoricidae, both Demospongiae in the order Tetractinellida.
