= Acanthotetilla celebensis =

Scientific classification
- Kingdom: Animalia
- Phylum: Porifera
- Class: Demospongiae
- Order: Tetractinellida
- Family: Tetillidae
- Genus: Acanthotetilla
- Species: A. celebensis

Binomial name
- Acanthotetilla celebensis de Voogd & van Soest, 2007

Species of sponge

Acanthotetilla celebensis is a species of sea sponge belonging to the family Tetillidae. It is only known from a single specimen collected at a depth of 14 m off Bunaken Island, north Sulawesi, Indonesia.

This firm yellow sponge is roughly hemispherical and around 12 cm across. Like other species of the genus Acanthotetilla, it is characterized by the presence of distinctive spiny spicules called "megacanthoxeas". This sponge, however, differs from the other described species in that the megacanthoxeas exist in two distinctly different sizes as opposed to being uniform in size.
