= Thrombus (sponge) =

Scientific classification
- Kingdom: Animalia
- Phylum: Porifera
- Class: Demospongiae
- Order: Tetractinellida
- Family: Thrombidae
- Genus: Thrombus

Genus of sponges

Thrombus is a genus of sea sponge belonging to the family Thrombidae.

== Species ==
- Thrombus abyssi (Carter, 1873)
- Thrombus challengeri Sollas, 1886
- Thrombus jancai Lehnert, 1998
- Thrombus ornatus Sollas, 1888
