= Scleritodermidae =

Scientific classification
- Kingdom: Animalia
- Phylum: Porifera
- Class: Demospongiae
- Order: Tetractinellida
- Suborder: Spirophorina
- Family: Scleritodermidae; Sollas, 1888

Family of sponges

Scleritodermidae is a family of sea sponges.

== Genera ==
- Aciculites Schmidt, 1879
- Amphibleptula Schmidt, 1879
- Microscleroderma Kirkpatrick, 1903
- Pomelia Zittel, 1878
- Scleritoderma Sollas, 1888
- Setidium Schmidt, 1879
