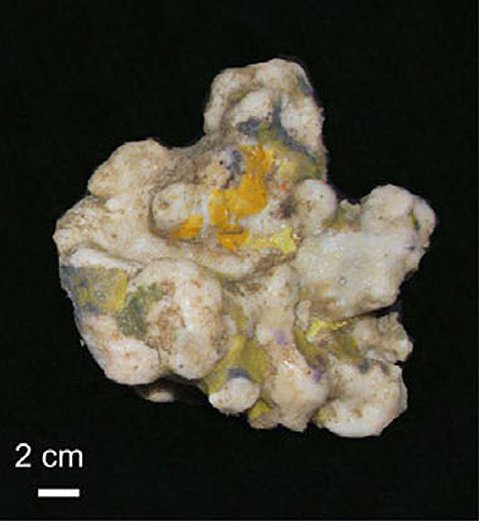
- Pachastrella ovisternata

Scientific classification
- Kingdom: Animalia
- Phylum: Porifera
- Class: Demospongiae
- Order: Tetractinellida
- Family: Pachastrellidae
- Genus: Pachastrella; Schmidt, 1868

Synonyms
- Picraster Sollas, 1888

= Pachastrella =

Genus of sponges

Pachastrella is a genus of sponges belonging to the family Pachastrellidae, that was first described in 1868 by Eduard Oscar Schmidt.

Species of this genus are found throughout the world.

== Species ==
Species listed by WoRMS:

- Pachastrella abyssi Schmidt, 1870
- Pachastrella caliculata Kirkpatrick, 1902
- Pachastrella chuni Lendenfeld, 1907
- Pachastrella cribrum Lebwohl, 1914
- Pachastrella dilifera de Laubenfels, 1934
- Pachastrella echinorhabda Pulitzer-Finali, 1972
- Pachastrella fusca Lebwohl, 1914
- Pachastrella incrustata Bergquist, 1968
- Pachastrella isorrhopa Kirkpatrick, 1902
- Pachastrella monilifera Schmidt, 1868
- Pachastrella multipora Dickinson, 1945
- Pachastrella nodulosa Cárdenas & Rapp, 2012
- Pachastrella ovisternata Lendenfeld, 1894
- Pachastrella pacoi Van Soest, Meesters & Becking, 2014
- Pachastrella scrobiculosa Lebwohl, 1914
