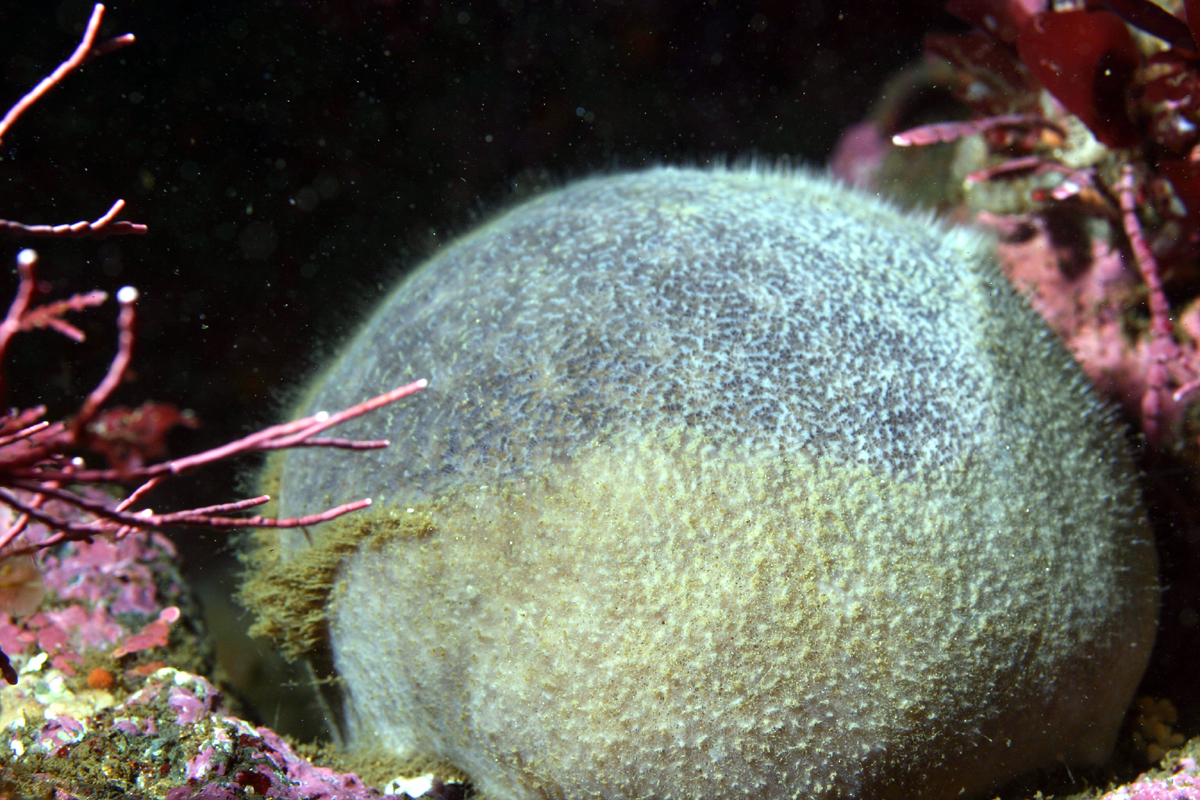
- Craniella arb

Scientific classification
- Domain: Eukaryota
- Kingdom: Animalia
- Phylum: Porifera
- Class: Demospongiae
- Order: Tetractinellida
- Family: Tetillidae
- Genus: Craniella; Schmidt, 1870

Species
- See text

Synonyms
- Craniellopsis Topsent, 1913; Polyurella Gray, 1870; Tethyopsilla Lendenfeld, 1888

= Craniella =

Genus of sponges

Craniella is a genus of marine sponges in the family Tetillidae.

== Species ==
The following species are recognised in the genus Craniella:

- Craniella abracadabra de Laubenfels, 1954
- Craniella arb (de Laubenfels, 1930)
- Craniella atropurpurea (Carter, 1870)
- Craniella australis Samaai & Gibbons, 2005
- Craniella azorica (Topsent, 1913)
- Craniella baeri Van Soest & Hooper, 2020
- Craniella carteri Sollas, 1886
- Craniella coxi (Lendenfeld, 1886)
- Craniella craniana de Laubenfels, 1953
- Craniella cranium (Müller, 1776)
- Craniella crustocorticata Van Soest, 2017
- Craniella curviclada Fernandez, Rodriguez, Santos, Pinheiro & Muricy, 2018
- Craniella disigma Topsent, 1904
- Craniella elegans Dendy, 1905
- Craniella globosa Thiele, 1898
- Craniella hamatum (Koltun, 1966)
- Craniella insidiosa Schmidt, 1870
- Craniella lens Schmidt, 1870
- Craniella lentiformis Thiele, 1898
- Craniella lentisimilis Tanita & Hoshino, 1989
- Craniella longipilis (Topsent, 1904)
- Craniella metaclada (Lendenfeld, 1907)
- Craniella monodi (Burton, 1929)
- Craniella neocaledoniae Lévi & Lévi, 1983
- Craniella ovata Thiele, 1898
- Craniella oxeata (Burton, 1959)
- Craniella polyura (Schmidt, 1870)
- Craniella prosperiaradix Tanita & Hoshino, 1989
- Craniella schmidtii Sollas, 1886
- Craniella sigmoancoratum (Koltun, 1966)
- Craniella simillima (Bowerbank, 1873)
- Craniella spinosa Lambe, 1893
- Craniella sputnika Lehnert & Stone, 2011
- Craniella stewarti (Lendenfeld, 1888)
- Craniella tethyoides Schmidt, 1870
- Craniella varians Thiele, 1898
- Craniella vestita (Lendenfeld, 1907)
- Craniella villosa Lambe, 1893
- Craniella wolfi Schuster, 2018
- Craniella zetlandica (Carter, 1872)
