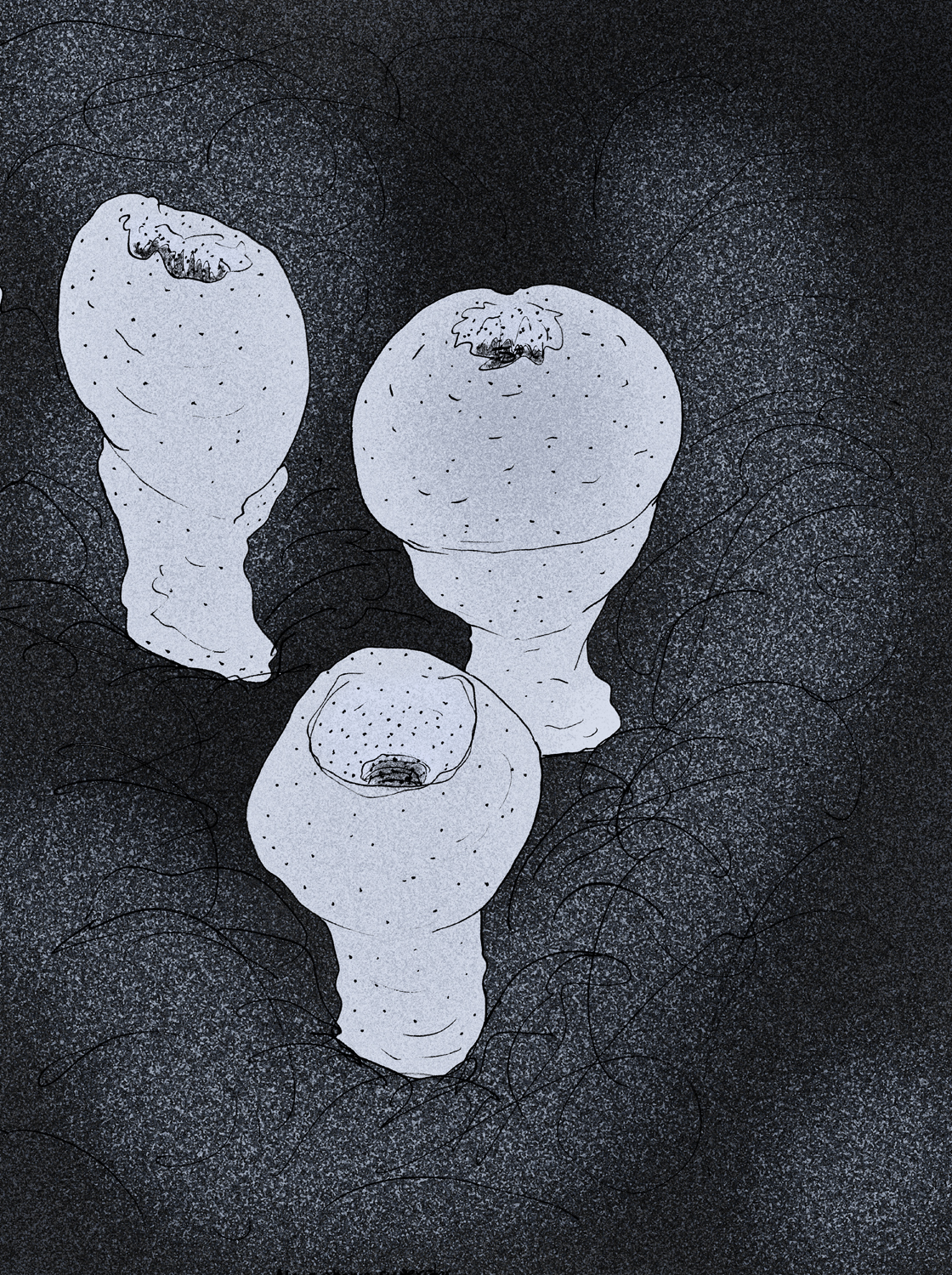
- Neosiphonia superstes

Scientific classification
- Kingdom: Animalia
- Phylum: Porifera
- Class: Demospongiae
- Order: Tetractinellida
- Suborder: Astrophorina
- Family: Phymatellidae; Schrammen, 1910

= Phymatellidae =

Family of sponges

Phymatellidae is a family of sea sponges.

== Genera ==
- Neoaulaxinia Pisera & Lévi, 2002
- Neosiphonia Sollas, 1888
- Reidispongia Lévi & Lévi, 1988
