= Acanthotetilla =

Scientific classification
- Domain: Eukaryota
- Kingdom: Animalia
- Phylum: Porifera
- Class: Demospongiae
- Order: Tetractinellida
- Family: Tetillidae
- Genus: Acanthotetilla; Burton, 1959

Species
- see text

Synonyms
- Acanthocinachyra Lévi, 1964

Genus of sponges

Acanthotetilla is a genus of demosponges belonging to the family Tetillidae. They are distinguished from others in the family by the presence of distinctive, heavily spined skeletal structures called "megacanthoxeas".

== Species ==
There are seven species described in the genus:

- Acanthotetilla celebensis de Voogd & van Soest, 2007 - Found in the Indian Ocean.
- Acanthotetilla enigmatica (Lévi, 1964) - Found in the Indian Ocean.
- Acanthotetilla gorgonosclera van Soest, 1977 - Found in the Atlantic Ocean near Barbados.
- Acanthotetilla hemisphaerica Burton, 1959 - Found in the Indian Ocean.
- Acanthotetilla rocasensis Peixinho, Fernandez, Oliveira, Caires & Hajdu, 2007
- Acanthotetilla seychellensis (Thomas, 1973) - Found in the Indian Ocean.
- Acanthotetilla walteri Peixinho, Fernandez, Oliveira, Caires & Hajdu, 2007
