= Pleromidae =

Scientific classification
- Kingdom: Animalia
- Phylum: Porifera
- Class: Demospongiae
- Order: Tetractinellida
- Suborder: Astrophorina
- Family: Pleromidae; Sollas, 1888

Family of sponges

Pleromidae is a family of oceanic sea sponges.

== Genera ==
- Anaderma Lévi & Lévi, 1983
- Pleroma Sollas 1888
