= Thoosa (sponge) =

Scientific classification
- Kingdom: Animalia
- Phylum: Porifera
- Class: Demospongiae
- Order: Tetractinellida
- Family: Thoosidae
- Genus: Thoosa; Hancock, 1849

Species
- See text

Synonyms
- List: Annandalea Topsent, 1928; Annandalena Topsent, 1932; Thooce Laubenfels, 1936

Genus of sponges

Thoosa is a genus of sea sponges in the family Thoosidae. This genus is known for boring holes in corals. It contains sixteen described species.

== Species ==
Species in this genus include:

- Thoosa amphiasterina Topsent, 1920
- Thoosa armata Topsent, 1888
- Thoosa bulbosa Hancock, 1849
- Thoosa cactoides Hancock, 1849
- Thoosa calpulli Carballo, Cruz-Barraza & Gomez, 2004
- Thoosa circumflexa Topsent, 1891
- Thoosa fischeri Topsent, 1891
- Thoosa laeviaster Annandale, 1915
- Thoosa letellieri Topsent, 1891
- Thoosa midwayi Azzini, Calcinai, Iwasaki & Bavestrello, 2007
- Thoosa mismalolli Carballo, Cruz-Barraza & Gomez, 2004
- Thoosa mollis Volz, 1939
- Thoosa purpurea Cruz-Barraza, Carballo, Bautista-Guerrero & Nava, 2011
- Thoosa radiata Topsent, 1887
- Thoosa socialis Carter, 1880
- Thoosa tortonesei Sarà, 1958
