= Yucatania =

Scientific classification
- Domain: Eukaryota
- Kingdom: Animalia
- Phylum: Porifera
- Class: Demospongiae
- Order: Tetractinellida
- Family: Thrombidae
- Genus: Yucatania; Gómez, 2006
- Species: Y. sphaeroidocladus

Binomial name
- Yucatania sphaeroidocladus Hartman & Hubbard, 1999

Species of sponge

Yucatania is a genus of sea sponge. It is monotypic, with the single species Yucatania sphaeroidocladus.
