= Phymaraphiniidae =

Scientific classification
- Kingdom: Animalia
- Phylum: Porifera
- Class: Demospongiae
- Order: Tetractinellida
- Suborder: Astrophorina
- Family: Phymaraphiniidae; Schrammen, 1924

Family of sponges

Phymaraphiniidae is a family of sea sponges.

== Genera ==
- Exsuperantia Özdikmen, 2009
- Kaliapsis Bowerbank, 1869
- Lepidothenea de Laubenfels, 1936
