= Neopeltidae =

Scientific classification
- Kingdom: Animalia
- Phylum: Porifera
- Class: Demospongiae
- Order: Tetractinellida
- Suborder: Astrophorina
- Family: Neopeltidae; Sollas, 1888

Synonyms
- Daedalopeltidae Laubenfels, 1936

Family of sponges

Neopeltidae is a family of sea sponges.

== Genera ==
- Daedalopelta Sollas, 1888
- Homophymia Vacelet & Vasseur, 1971
- Neopelta Schmidt, 1880
- Sollasipelta Van Soest & Hooper, 2020
