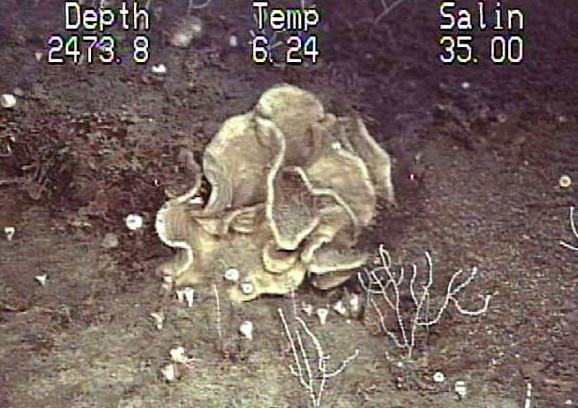
- Leiodermatium sp., a member of the genus Leiodermatium in the family of Azoricidae

Scientific classification
- Kingdom: Animalia
- Phylum: Porifera
- Class: Demospongiae
- Order: Tetractinellida
- Suborder: Spirophorina
- Family: Azoricidae; Sollas, 1888

Genera
- See text

Synonyms
- Leiodermatiidae Lendenfeld, 1903

= Azoricidae =

Family of sponges

Azoricidae is a family of marine sponges belonging to the order of Tetractinellida.

== Genera ==
- Desmascula de Laubenfels, 1950
- Jereicopsis Lévi & Lévi, 1983
- Leiodermatium Schmidt, 1870
