= Thrombidae =

Scientific classification
- Kingdom: Animalia
- Phylum: Porifera
- Class: Demospongiae
- Order: Tetractinellida
- Suborder: Astrophorina
- Family: Thrombidae; Sollas, 1888

Family of sponges

Thrombidae is a family of sea sponges.

== Genera ==
- Thrombus Sollas, 1886
- Yucatania Gómez, 2006
