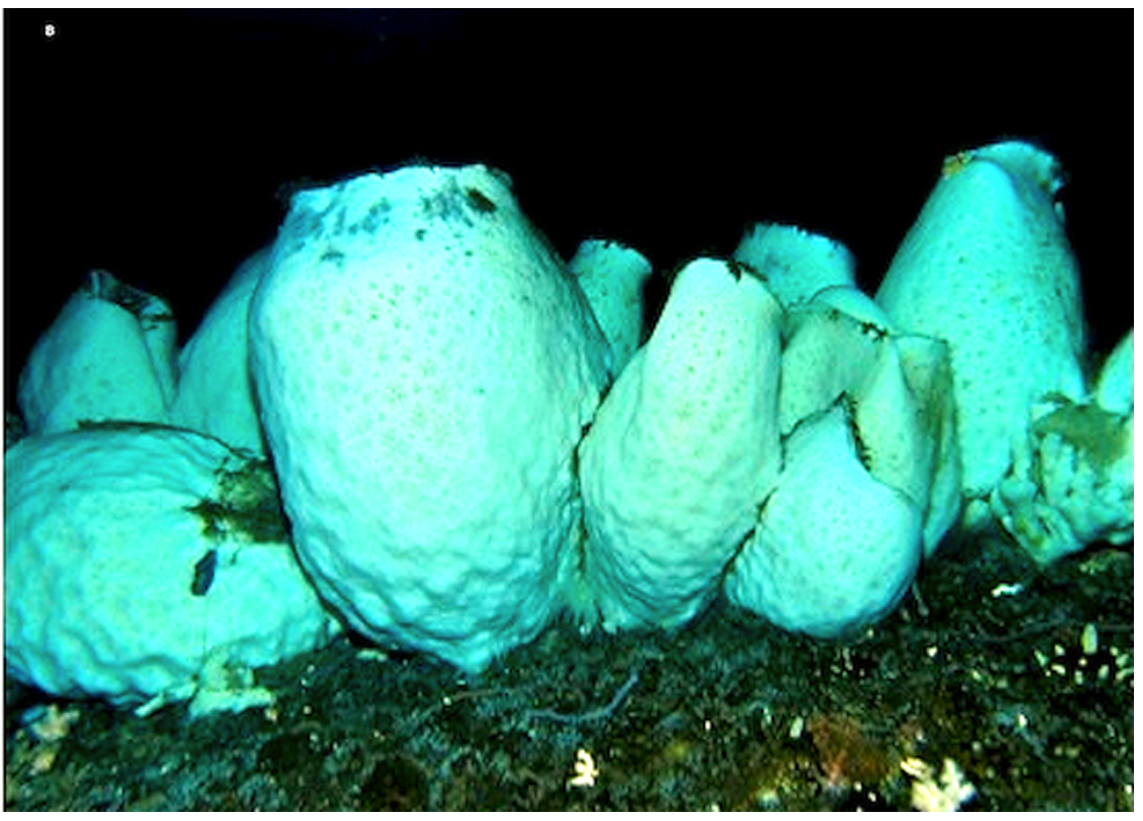

Scientific classification
- Kingdom: Animalia
- Phylum: Porifera
- Class: Hexactinellida
- Order: Lyssacinosida
- Family: Rossellidae
- Genus: Anoxycalyx
- Species: A. joubini

Binomial name
- Anoxycalyx joubini (Topsent, 1916)

Synonyms
- Scolymastra joubini Topsent, 1916

= Anoxycalyx joubini =

Species of sponge

The giant volcano sponge (Anoxycalyx joubini) is a species of Antarctic sponge. It is one of the largest sponges in the world which can grow up to a diameter of 1.5 metres (5 feet) and 1.95 metres (6.5 feet) in height. The species may have an extremely long lifespan, with estimates of up to 15,000 years. A. joubini occurs in deeper waters than the similar species Cinachyra antarctica, which is also very long-lived. Antarctic sponges live at 100–2,000 m (330–6,560 ft) below the surface, in extremely cold temperatures and constant pressure. This may slow down their growth rate and other biological processes because one caught specimen of A. joubini did not show any growth in a span of 10 years.

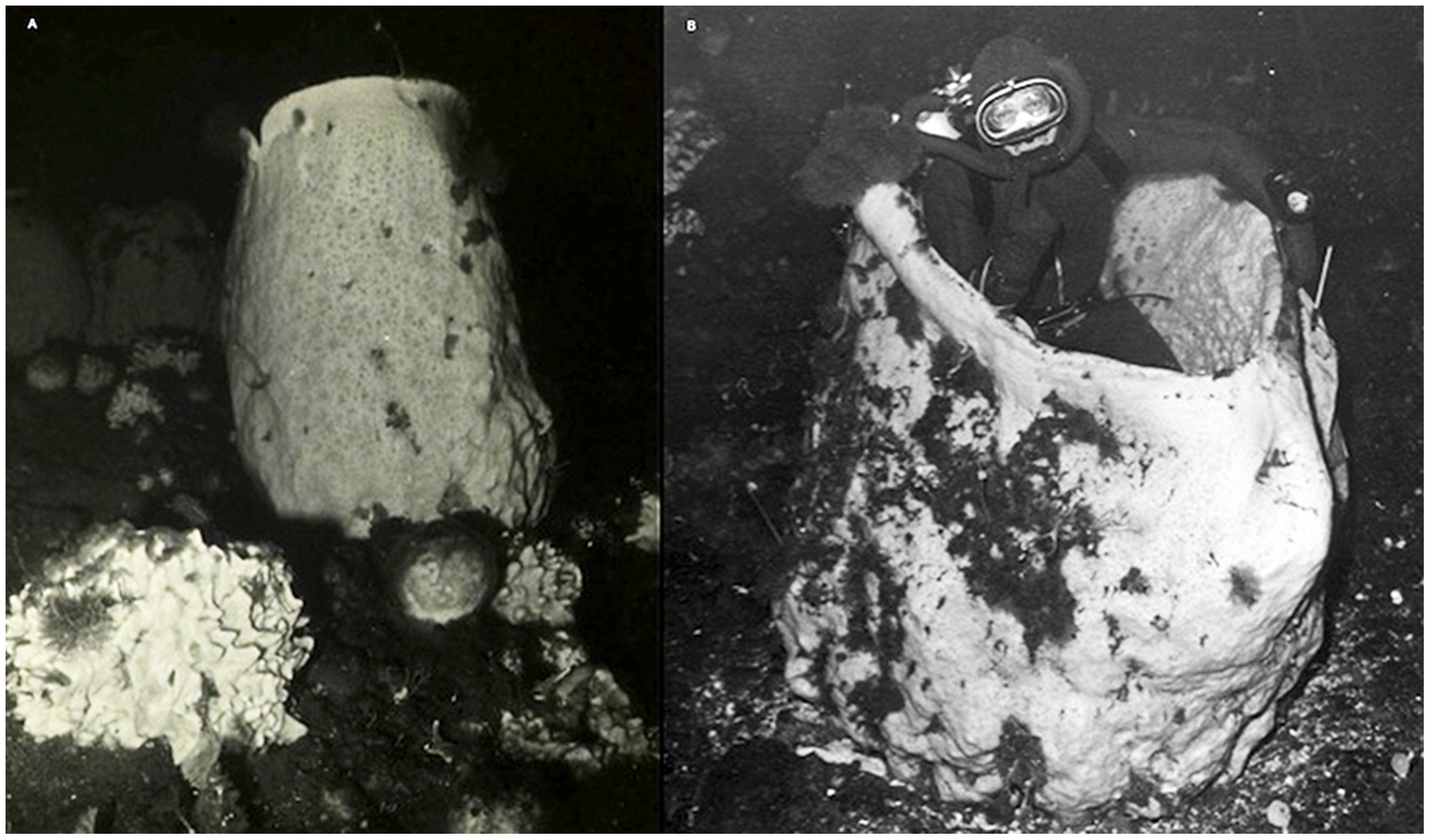
A giant volcano sponge, perhaps thousands of years old
