= Samus anonymus =

Scientific classification
- Kingdom: Animalia
- Phylum: Porifera
- Class: Demospongiae
- Order: Tetractinellida
- Family: Samidae; Sollas, 1888
- Genus: Samus; Gray, 1867
- Species: S. anonymus

Binomial name
- Samus anonymus Gray, 1867

Species of sponge

Samus is a genus of sea sponges. It is the only genus in the monotypic family Samidae and is represented by a single species, Samus anonymus.
