= Calthropella =

Scientific classification
- Kingdom: Animalia
- Phylum: Porifera
- Class: Demospongiae
- Order: Tetractinellida
- Family: Calthropellidae; Lendenfeld, 1907
- Genus: Calthropella; Sollas, 1888

Genus of sponges

Calthropella is a genus of sea sponges in the order Tetractinellida. It is the only genus in the monotypic family Calthropellidae.

== Species ==
The following species are recognised in the genus Calthropella:

- Calthropella durissima Topsent, 1892
- Calthropella geodioides (Carter, 1876)
- Calthropella enigmatica (Lévi & Lévi, 1983)
- Calthropella inopinata Pulitzer-Finali, 1983
- Calthropella lithistina (Schmidt, 1880)
- Calthropella novaezealandiae (Bergquist, 1961)
- Calthropella pathologica (Schmidt, 1868)
- Calthropella pyrifera van Soest, Beglinger & de Voogd, 2010
- Calthropella recondita Pulitzer-Finali, 1972
- Calthropella simplex Sollas, 1888
- Calthropella stelligera (Schmidt, 1868)
- Calthropella xavierae van Soest, Beglinger & de Voogd, 2010
