= Igerna Sollas =

British zoologist and geologist

- Born: Igerna Brünhilda Johnson Sollas; 16 March 1877; Dawlish, Devon, England
- Died: November 1965 (aged 88)
- Education: Alexandra College
- Alma mater: Newnham College, Cambridge
- Scientific career
- Fields: Zoology, geology
- Institutions: Newnham College, Cambridge

Igerna Brünhilda Johnson Sollas (1877–1965), also known as Hilda Sollas, was a British zoologist, palaeontologist and geologist, and lecturer at Newnham College, Cambridge. She was one of the first women to be taught geology at the University of Cambridge. She had wide interests, studying marine organisms, genetics, and palaeontology, and collaborated with Cambridge geneticist William Bateson. An alumna of Alexandra College, Dublin, she was recognized as a role model for women in higher education in Ireland and England.

== Early life and education ==
Igerna Sollas was born on 16 March 1877 in Dawlish, Devon, the daughter of geologist William Johnson Sollas and his first wife Helen. She received an early education at Alexandra School and College in Dublin, and then attended Newnham College, Cambridge on a Gilchrist scholarship in 1897, where she took first class honours in both part I and part II of the Natural Sciences Tripos exam, completing a zoology degree in 1901. She held the position of lecturer in zoology at Newnham from 1903 to 1913, save for the period 1904 to 1906 when she was a Newnham college research fellow.

== Career ==
Her research included a huge range of animals, both modern and fossil. These included earthworms, sponges and sea squirts, fish, mammal-ancestors and mammals. She is also known for methods of separating minerals for chemical analysis, and for work using serial grinding. She led research on fossils in collaboration with her father, and they were the first people to use the serial sectioning device he invented to look at the structure of a dicynodont skull. At Cambridge she was part of an active research group led by William Bateson, and she studied the genetics of colouration in guinea pigs and moth wings.

== Later life ==
Later in life she became a practitioner of Christian Science and contributed articles to Christian Science journals. In moving to Christian Science she gave up her work on animal genetics and biology. She passed her research on to biologist and writer, Naomi Mitchison and her brother, biologist J. B. S Haldane. Her scientific publications ceased after 1916, and she took up gardening and care of her father's house after his death in 1936.

== Death and legacy ==
Sollas died in November 1965, aged 88. She is commemorated in the name Igernella, a genus of sponges named by zoologist Émile Topsent in 1905, and by the echinoderm Euthemon igerna.
