= Corallistidae =

Scientific classification
- Kingdom: Animalia
- Phylum: Porifera
- Class: Demospongiae
- Order: Tetractinellida
- Family: Corallistidae; Sollas, 1888

Family of sponges

Corallistidae is a family of sea sponges.

== Genera ==
- Awhiowhio Kelly, 2007
- Corallistes Schmidt, 1870
- Herengeria Lévi & Lévi, 1988
- Iberogilletia Ceccolini & Cianferoni, 2022
- Isabella Schlacher-Hoenlinger, Pisera & Hooper, 2005
- Neophrissospongia Pisera & Lévi, 2002
- Neoschrammeniella Pisera & Lévi, 2002
