= Costifer =

Scientific classification
- Domain: Eukaryota
- Kingdom: Animalia
- Phylum: Porifera
- Class: Demospongiae
- Order: Tetractinellida
- Family: Isoraphiniidae; Schrammen, 1924
- Genus: Costifer; Wilson, 1925

Genus of sponges

Costifer is a genus in the monotypic family Isoraphiniidae of sea sponges, and was first described by Henry Van Peters Wilson in 1925.

== Species ==
There are two recognized species:

- Costifer vasiformis Wilson, 1925
- Costifer wilsoni Lévi, 1993
