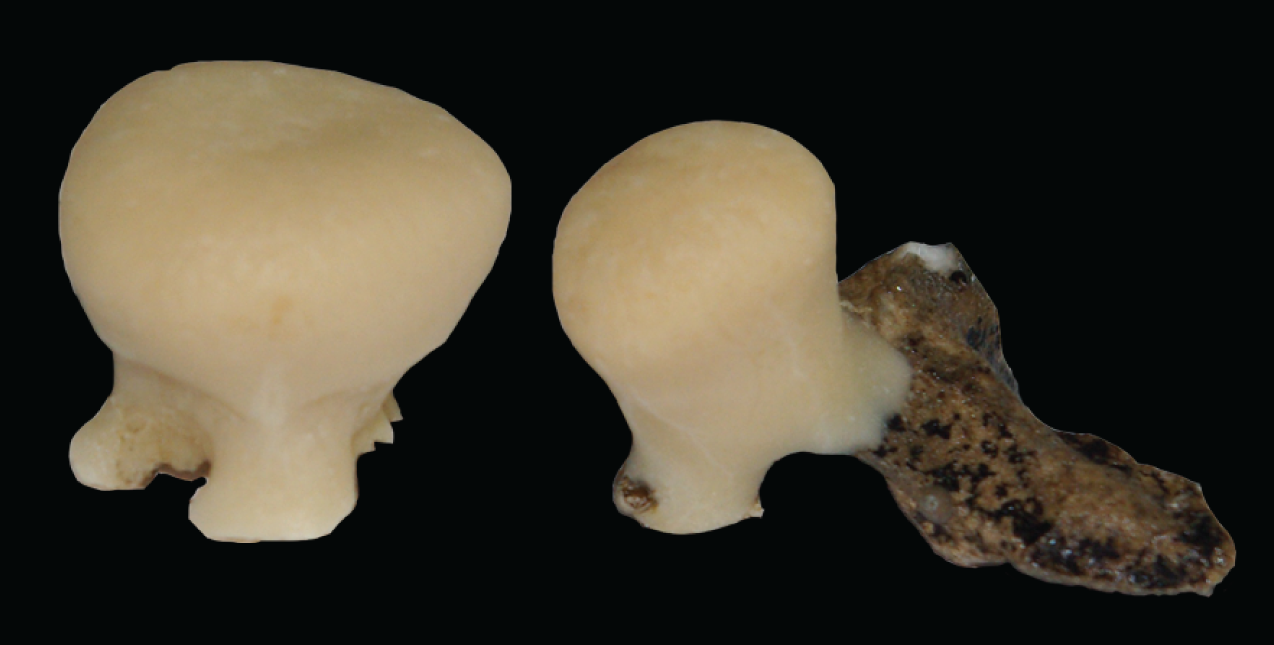
- Macandrewia robusta

Scientific classification
- Kingdom: Animalia
- Phylum: Porifera
- Class: Demospongiae
- Order: Tetractinellida
- Family: Macandrewiidae; Schrammen, 1924
- Genus: Macandrewia; Gray, 1859

Type species
- Macandrewia azorica Gray, 1859

Species
- See text.

= Macandrewia =

Genus of sponges

Macandrewia is a genus of sea sponges, and is the only genus in the monotypic family Macandrewiidae.

== Description ==
Species are cup-shaped, expanded, more or less sinuate or lobed. They are attached to the substrate by a more solid base. They are covered by a fleshy layer. It is supported by a siliceous cup-shaped axis. The upper surface is covered in of pores, which are grouped into roses which are surrounded by radiating grooves. The lower surface is non-porous.

== Species ==
The following species are recognised:

- Macandrewia auris Lendenfeld, 1907
- Macandrewia azorica Gray, 1859
- Macandrewia clavatella (Schmidt, 1870)
- Macandrewia minima Carvalho & Xavier, 2020
- Macandrewia ramosa Topsent, 1904
- Macandrewia rigida Lévi & Lévi, 1989
- Macandrewia robusta Topsent, 1904
- Macandrewia schusterae Carvalho & Xavier, 2020
- Macandrewia spinifoliata Lévi & Lévi, 1983
