= Thoosidae =

Scientific classification
- Domain: Eukaryota
- Kingdom: Animalia
- Phylum: Porifera
- Class: Demospongiae
- Order: Tetractinellida
- Suborder: Thoosina
- Family: Thoosidae

Family of sponges

Thoosidae is a family of sponges belonging to the order Tetractinellida.

Genera:

- Alectona Carter, 1879
- Delectona Laubenfels, 1936
- Neamphius Laubenfels, 1953
- Thoosa Hancock, 1849
