= Siphonidiidae =

Scientific classification
- Domain: Eukaryota
- Kingdom: Animalia
- Phylum: Porifera
- Class: Demospongiae
- Order: Tetractinellida
- Family: Siphonidiidae

Family of sponges

Siphonidiidae is a family of sponges belonging to the order Tetractinellida.

Genera:

- Gastrophanella Schmidt, 1879
- Lithobactrum Kirkpatrick, 1903
- Siphonidium Schmidt, 1879
