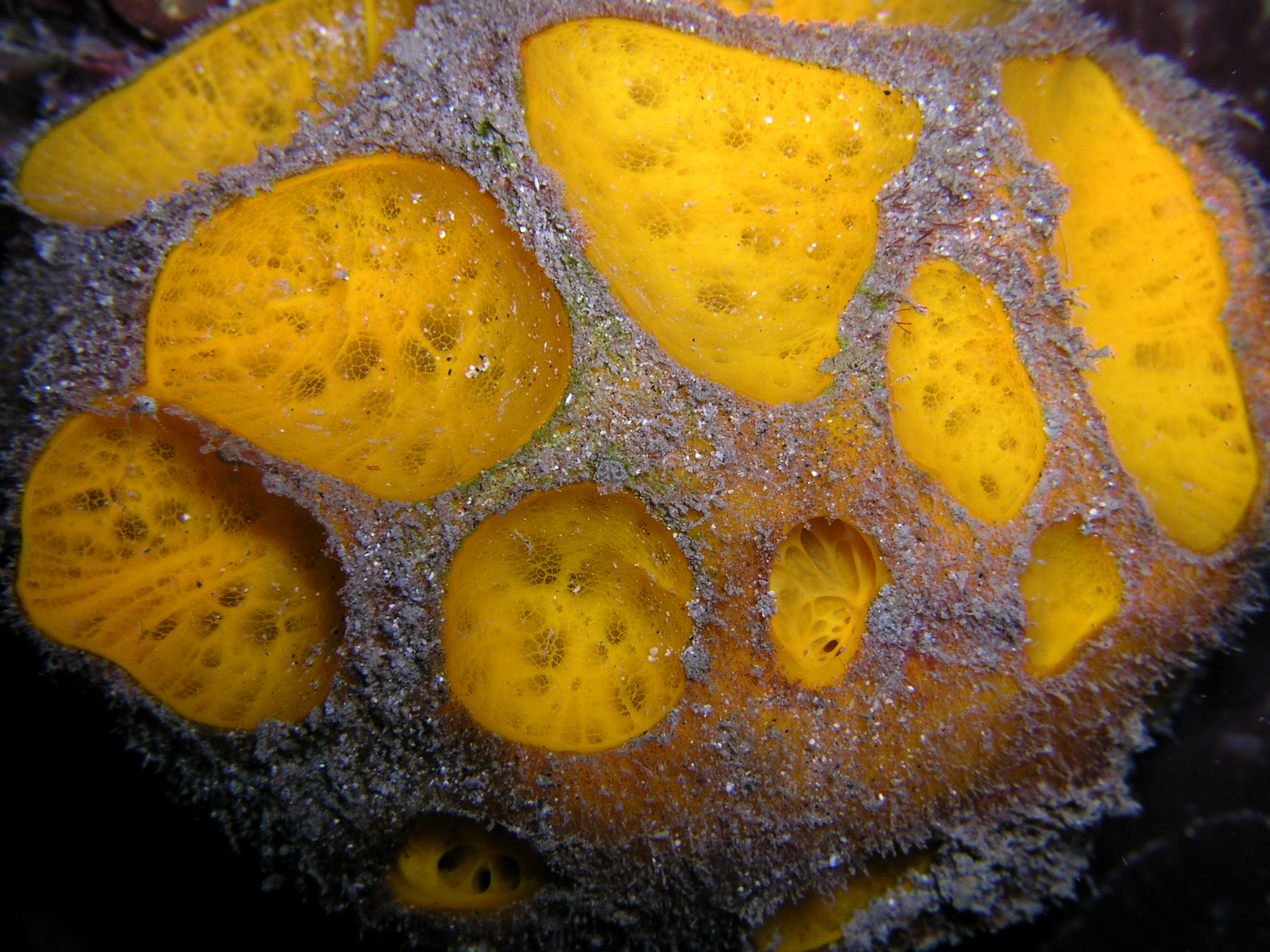
- Cinachyra sp. (golf ball sponge)

Scientific classification
- Domain: Eukaryota
- Kingdom: Animalia
- Phylum: Porifera
- Class: Demospongiae
- Order: Tetractinellida
- Family: Tetillidae
- Genus: Cinachyra (Sollas, 1886)

Synonyms
- Cinochyra [lapsus]

= Cinachyra =

Genus of sponges

Cinachyra is a genus of sponge belonging to the family Tetillidae.

== Species ==
There are four species recognized in the genus:

- Cinachyra antarctica (Carter, 1872)
- Cinachyra barbata Sollas, 1886
- Cinachyrella crassispicula (Lendenfeld, 1907)
- Cinachyra helena Rodriguez & Muricy, 2007

== Bibliography ==
- Cristovao, A. J., Cenleno, J. A., & Collety, P. (2006). Bioaccumulation of metals in the Genus Cinachyra (Porifera) from the Mid-Atlantic Ridge. Metal Ions in Biology and Medicine, 9, 175.
