= Theneidae =

Scientific classification
- Domain: Eukaryota
- Kingdom: Animalia
- Phylum: Porifera
- Class: Demospongiae
- Order: Tetractinellida
- Family: Theneidae

Family of sponges

Theneidae is a family of sponges belonging to the order Tetractinellida.

Genera:

- Annulastrella Maldonado, 2002
- Cladothenea Koltun, 1964
- Thenea Gray, 1867
