= Vulcanellidae =

Scientific classification
- Kingdom: Animalia
- Phylum: Porifera
- Class: Demospongiae
- Order: Tetractinellida
- Family: Vulcanellidae; Cárdenas, Xavier, Reveillaud, Schander & Rapp, 2011

Family of sponges

Vulcanellidae is a family of sponges belonging to the order Tetractinellida.

Genera:

- Lamellomorpha Bergquist, 1968
- Poecillastra Sollas, 1888
- Vulcanella Sollas, 1886
