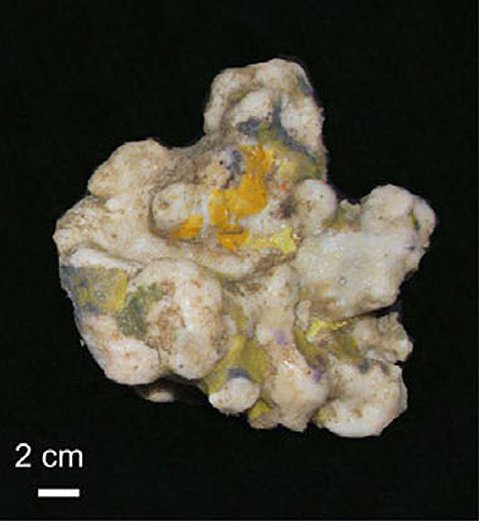
- Pachastrella ovisternata

Scientific classification
- Kingdom: Animalia
- Phylum: Porifera
- Class: Demospongiae
- Order: Tetractinellida
- Suborder: Astrophorina
- Family: Pachastrellidae; Carter, 1875

= Pachastrellidae =

Family of demosponges

Pachastrellidae is a family of sea sponges.

== Genera ==
- Acanthotriaena Vacelet, Vasseur & Lévi, 1976
- Ancorella Lendenfeld, 1907
- Brachiaster Wilson, 1925
- Characella Sollas, 1886
- Nethea Sollas, 1888
- Pachastrella Schmidt, 1868
- Triptolemma de Laubenfels, 1955
