= Spirasigmidae =

Scientific classification
- Domain: Eukaryota
- Kingdom: Animalia
- Phylum: Porifera
- Class: Demospongiae
- Order: Tetractinellida
- Family: Spirasigmidae

Family of sponges

Spirasigmidae is a family of sponges belonging to the order Tetractinellida.

Genera:

- Spirasigma Hallmann, 1912
- Tentorina Burton, 1959
