= Stupenda =

Scientific classification
- Kingdom: Animalia
- Phylum: Porifera
- Class: Demospongiae
- Order: Tetractinellida
- Family: Stupendidae; Kelly & Cárdenas, 2016
- Genus: Stupenda; Kelly & Cárdenas, 2016
- Species: S. singularis

Binomial name
- Stupenda singularis Kelly & Cárdenas, 2016

Genus of sponges

Stupenda is a genus of sea sponges. It is the only genus in the monotypic family Stupendidae and is represented by a single species, Stupenda singularis.

== Habitat ==
Stupenda singularis is found near the Colville Ridge, in the waters of the New Zealand Exclusive Economic Zone.
