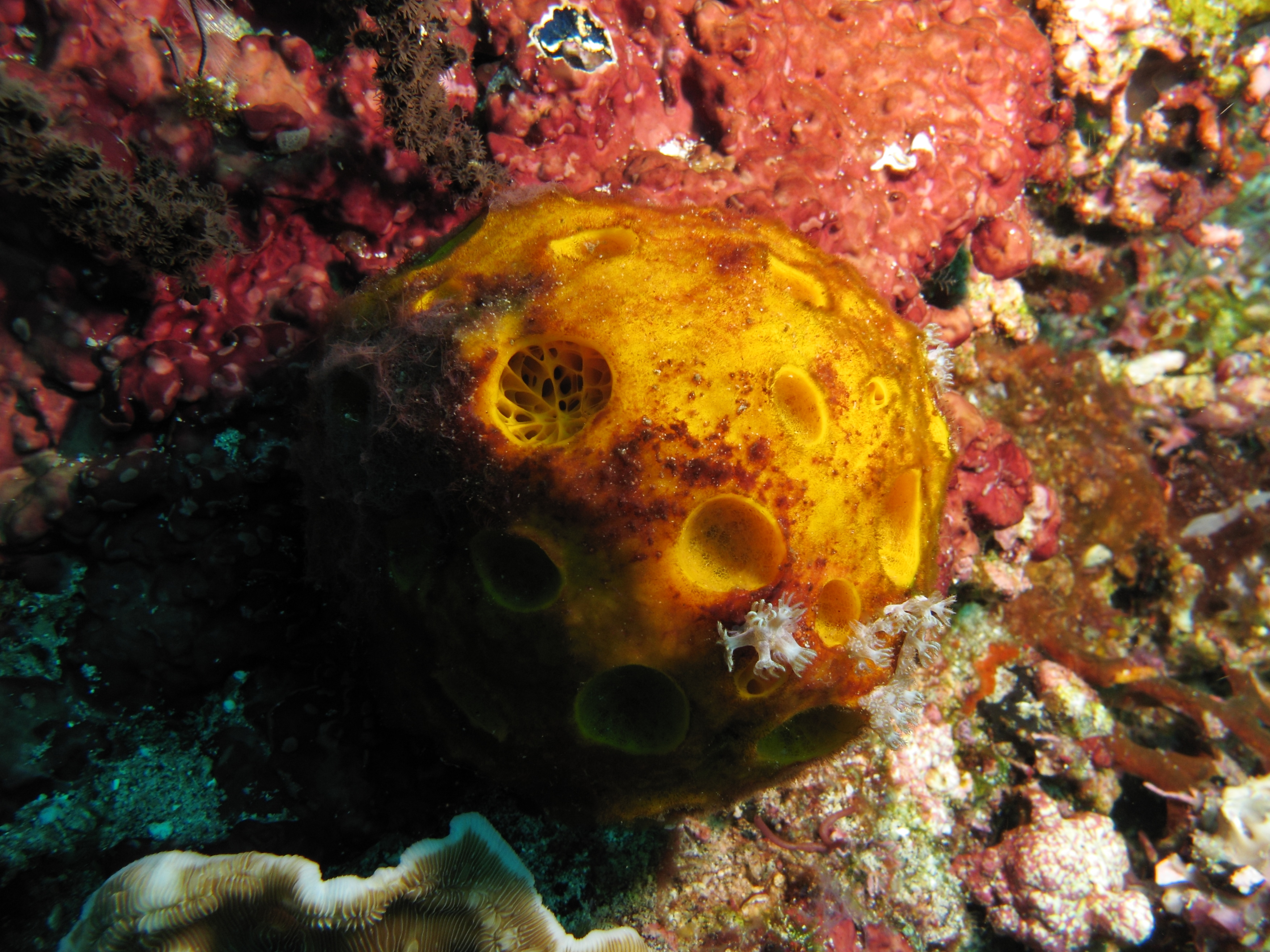
- Cinachyrella sp.

Scientific classification
- Kingdom: Animalia
- Phylum: Porifera
- Class: Demospongiae
- Order: Tetractinellida
- Suborder: Spirophorina
- Family: Tetillidae; Sollas, 1886

Genera
- See text

Synonyms
- Ectyonillidae Ferrer Hernandez, 1914

= Tetillidae =

Family of sponges

Tetillidae is a family of marine sponges. Tetillids are more or less spherical sponges (sometimes referred to as golf ball sponges) which are found commonly in all marine habitats at all depths throughout the world. They are especially common in sedimented habitats. Over a hundred species have been described in ten genera.

== Reproduction ==
Reproduction in tetillids is quite varied, although free-swimming larvae have not been seen in this group. In some species fertilized eggs are released which settle directly onto the substrate and develop in situ. In other species the eggs develop within the body cavity of the adult sponge and are released as small adult sponges via localized breakdown of the pinacoderm.

== Genera ==
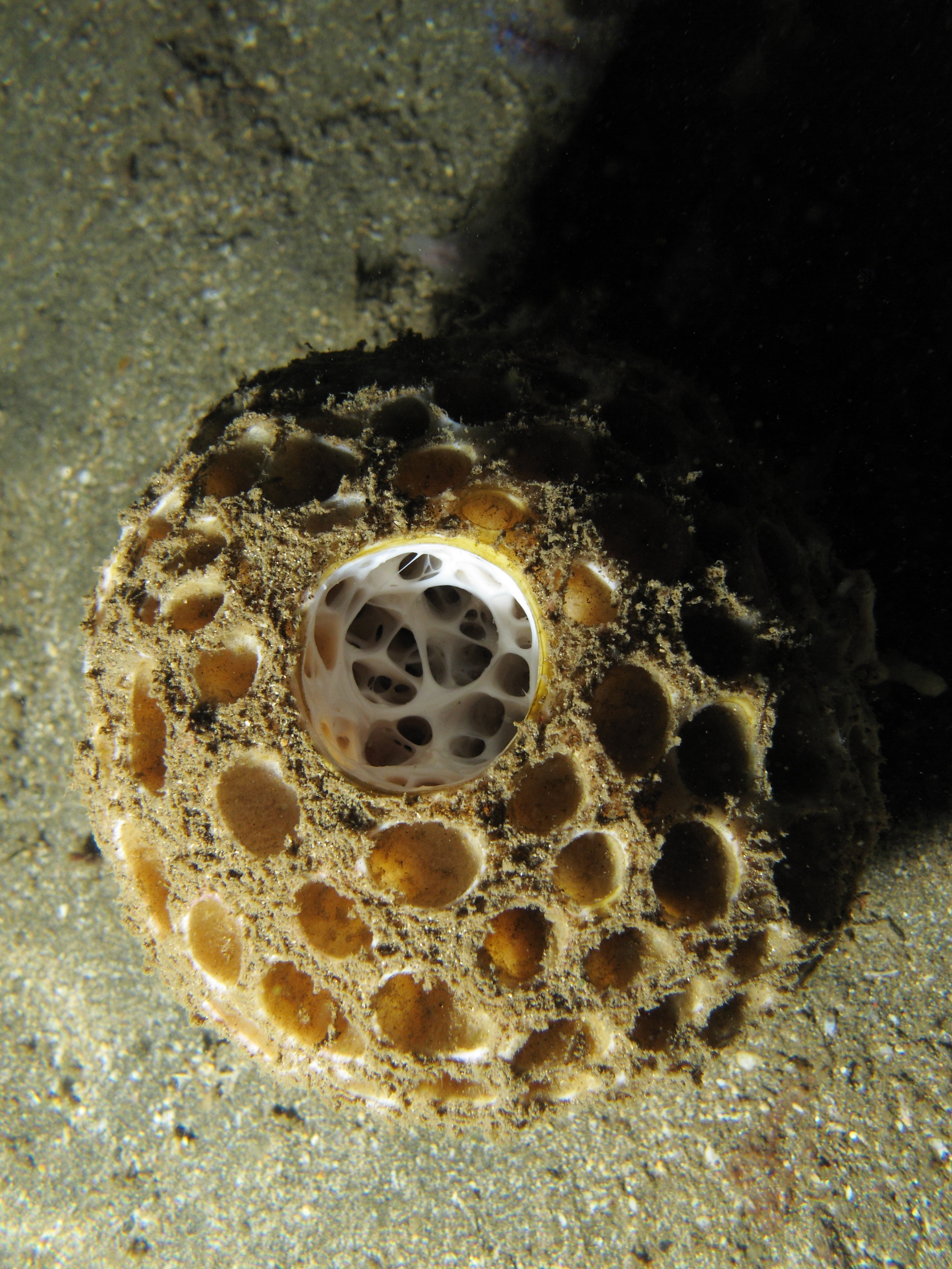
Cinachyrella sp.

- Acanthotetilla Burton, 1959
- Amphitethya Lendenfeld, 1907
- Antarctotetilla Carella, Agell, Cárdenas & Uriz, 2016
- Cinachyra Sollas, 1886
- Cinachyrella Wilson, 1925
- Craniella Schmidt, 1870
- Fangophilina Schmidt, 1880
- Levantiniella Carella, Agell, Cárdenas & Uriz, 2016
- Paratetilla Dendy, 1905
- Tetilla Schmidt, 1868
