= Anton Schrammen =

German paleontologist (1869–1953)

- Born: July 12, 1869; Rheinbach, Germany
- Died: April 6, 1953; Hildesheim, Germany
- Known for: Fossil sponges and cephalopods
- Scientific career
- Fields: Paleontology, Dentistry
- Institutions: Hildesheim

Anton Schrammen (12 July 1869 – 6 April 1953) was a German paleontologist and dentist in Hildesheim, Germany. He was an expert on fossil sponges and cephalopods.

== Biography ==
Born in 1869, Schrammen studied dentistry at the Silesian Friedrich Wilhelm University of Breslau. Since 1889, he was a member of the Breslauer Burschenschaft Germania. In 1911, he received his doctorate in Tübingen with a dissertation on Cretaceous sponges ("Ergebnisse meiner Bearbeitung der kretazischen Kieselspongien von Nordwestdeutschland"). He collected mainly in Höver and described over 200 new species. Schrammen established the order Lychniskida.

He also studied ceratites from the German Muschelkalk and proposed many new genera, which were later adopted as subgenera by Leonard Spath and subsequently by Rolf Wenger. More recent trends aim at further reduction (Max Urlichs, Siegfried Rein).

In 1912, he became a member of the Paleontological Society in its founding year. Parts of his collection are in the Roemer Museum in Hildesheim (where he published extensively) and in museums worldwide (including the American Museum of Natural History and the University of Göttingen).

He was the elder brother of architect Jakob Schrammen.

== Selected publications ==
- Die Lösung des Ceratitenproblems. Zeitschrift der Deutschen Geologischen Gesellschaft, 80, 1928, pp. 26–42.
- Beitrag zur Kenntnis der Nothosauriden des unteren Muschelkalks in Oberschlesien. Zeitschrift der Deutschen geologischen Gesellschaft, 51, 1899, pp. 388–408, plates XXI–XXVI
- Die Kieselspongien der oberen Kreide von Nordwestdeutschland. I.Teil: Tetraxonia, Monaxonia und Silicea incert. sedis. II.Teil: Triaxonia (Hexactinellida). Palaeontographica Supplementband V, 1910/1912, pp. 1–175; 176–385, III. Teil: Mit Beiträgen zur Stammesgeschichte. Monographien zur Geologie und Paläontologie, Serie I, Heft 2, Borntraeger 1924, pp. 1–159
- Zur Revision der Juraspongien von Süddeutschland. Jahresberichte und Mitteilungen des Oberrheinischen Geologischen Vereins, 1924, pp. 125–154.
- Ergebnisse einer neuen Bearbeitung der germanischen Ceratiten. Jb. Pr.Geol.L-A., 54, 1933, pp. 422–438
- Porifera (Paleontology). In: Handwörterbuch der Naturwissenschaften. 8, 1933, pp. 44–50.
- Die Kieselspongien des oberen Jura von Süddeutschland. Palaeontographica, A 84, 1936, pp. 149–194
