= William Johnson Sollas =

British geologist and anthropologist

Professor William Johnson Sollas FRS FGS FRSE
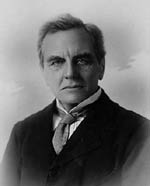
- Born: 30 May 1849; Birmingham
- Died: 20 October 1936 (aged 87); Oxford
- Education: St John's College, Cambridge
- Known for: invention of the diffusion column
- Children: Hertha Sollas; Igerna Sollas
- Awards: Bigsby Medal (1893); Wollaston Medal (1907); Royal Medal (1914)
- Scientific career
- Fields: geology and anthropology
- Workplaces: University College, Bristol; Trinity College Dublin; University of Oxford

William Johnson Sollas (30 May 1849 – 20 October 1936) was a British geologist and anthropologist. After studying at the City of London School, the Royal College of Chemistry and the Royal School of Mines he matriculated to St. John's College, Cambridge, where he was awarded First Class Honours in geology. After some time spent as a University Extension lecturer he became lecturer in Geology and Zoology at University College, Bristol in 1879, where he stayed until he was offered the post of Professor of Geology at Trinity College Dublin. In 1897 he was offered the post of Professor of Geology at the University of Oxford, which he accepted.

Considered "one of the last true geological polymaths", Sollas worked in a number of areas including the study of sponges, brachiopods and petrological research, and during his lifetime published 180 papers and wrote three books. He also invented the serial sectioning device for the study of fossils. His biggest contribution at Oxford was in expanding the University geology department, hiring new Demonstrators and Lecturers and expanding the facilities available to students. Described as "eccentric" in his final years, he left much of the running of the Department to J.A. Douglas while he concentrated on research, finally dying in office on 20 October 1936.

== Early life and education ==
Sollas was born in Birmingham on 30 May 1849 to William Henry Sollas, a ship owner, and his wife Emma Wheatley. He was educated at the City of London School, where he first became interested in chemistry, and from there moved on to the Royal College of Chemistry in 1865, spending two years working with Sir Edward Frankland, and in 1867 gained a scholarship to study at the Royal School of Mines. There he came under the influence of scientists such as Warington Wilkinson Smyth and Thomas Henry Huxley, later saying "I owe [Huxley] more, both morally and intellectually, than to any other I can name". After becoming an Associate of the Royal School of Mines he competed with William Garnett for chemistry scholarships at St. John's College, Cambridge; they were both accepted. At Cambridge Sollas was taught by Thomas George Bonney, who persuaded him to switch to geology, which he did, gaining First Class Honours in the Natural Sciences Tripos in 1873.

== Academia ==
After graduating Sollas spent six years as a University Extension Lecturer, publishing a syllabus of lectures in 1876 on geology and biology, and in 1879 became lecturer in Geology and Zoology at University College, Bristol. In 1880 he was made Professor of Geology. In 1883 Sollas left Bristol to take up a position as Professor of Geology at Trinity College Dublin, where he remained until he was made Professor of Geology at the University of Oxford in 1897. At Oxford his main contribution was significantly expanding the Geology department, appointing new demonstrators and lecturers and employing his own daughters as unpaid research assistants. At the same time he did research in a variety of fields, and was described as "one of the last true geological polymaths".

Professor Sollas lead the 1896 Funafuti Coral Reef Boring Expedition of the Royal Society, which was an expedition to Funafuti in the Ellice Islands (now known as Tuvalu) conducted by the Royal Society of London for the purpose of investigating the formation of coral reefs and the question as to whether traces of shallow water organisms could be found at depth in the coral of Pacific atolls. This investigation followed the work on the structure and distribution of coral reefs conducted by Charles Darwin in the Pacific. Drilling occurred in 1896, 1897 and 1911. The expedition conducted drilling on the atoll to take borings which it was hoped would settle the question of the formation of coral atolls. There were defects in the boring machinery and the bore penetrated only slightly more than 100 feet (approx. 31 m). In addition to reports of results of the expedition, Prof. Sollas also published The Legendary History of Funafuti.

In his later years Sollas became increasingly eccentric, and left much of the running of the Department to his Demonstrator, J.A. Douglas while he concentrated on research.

He died in Oxford on 20 October 1936, still in office. After his death Douglas attempted to link him to the Piltdown Man hoax.

== Research work ==
Sollas's research was over a wide area; during his lifetime he published over 180 papers and three books, and as well as his geological and zoological studies became an expert in anthropology. His first area of interest was the Cambridge Greensand, which he began working on when studying at the University of Cambridge. He published nine papers on the formation, mainly on the sponges, and for his work was awarded the Wollaston Medal in 1878. From 1878 until 1889 he dedicated his research work entirely to sponges and fossils, publishing a series of papers and reports on new species. In 1887 he wrote an article on phylum for the Encyclopædia Britannica. His work on sponges led him to investigate their physical structure, and from there the makeup of chalk.

At Bristol he worked in palaeontology, describing a new species of Plesiosaurus (presently Attenborosaurus), but also published papers on the geological makeup of Bristol and the Silesian fossils near the Welsh border. After moving to Dublin he worked on Foraminifera and brachiopods, before switching to petrological work. His first major paper was on the granite of Leinster, where he conducted a detailed chemical analysis of the rock and invented the diffusion column to assist in this. In 1896 he travelled to the Pacific Ocean to investigate the formation of the Funafuti coral atoll, drawing inconclusive results. In 1905 he published the collection of essays The Age of the Earth, and in 1911 an anthropological work Ancient Hunters and their Modern Representatives.

In 1889 Sollas became a Fellow of the Royal Society, and was awarded the Royal Medal in 1914. From 1900 to 1902 he was vice president, and from 1908 to 1910 he served as president of the Geological Society of London, who awarded him the Bigsby Medal in 1893 and the Wollaston Medal in 1907. Sollas is known for inventing the serial sectioning device, which made it possible to study the internal anatomy of fossils by removing thin layers of them in cross-section, and capturing the anatomy through drawings and photographs. This method was destructive, but made it possible to study previously unknown internal structures of fossil animals such as ichthyosaurs, and dicynodonts.

== Personal life and family ==
Sollas's first wife (1874) was Helen Coryn, daughter of William John Coryn of Weston-super-Mare. He and Helen had two daughters, both of whom became academics. Elder daughter Hertha received a PhD from the University of Heidelberg and translated several works into German, and his younger daughter Igerna was one of the first women to be awarded a degree in geology from the University of Cambridge, and went on to be a geologist and zoologist, collaborating on fossils with her father.

Helen died in 1911 and in 1914 he married Amabel Nevill Moseley (née Jeffreys), the widow of the naturalist Henry Nottidge Moseley. Amabel died in 1928 and he did not remarry.

== Collections ==
University College London Special Collections holds correspondence to Sollas from Thomas Bonney written between 1885 - 1920.

== Bibliography ==
- Woodward, A. Smith (1936). "278. William Johnson Sollas". Man. 36. Royal Anthropological Institute of Great Britain and Ireland. ISSN 0025-1496.
