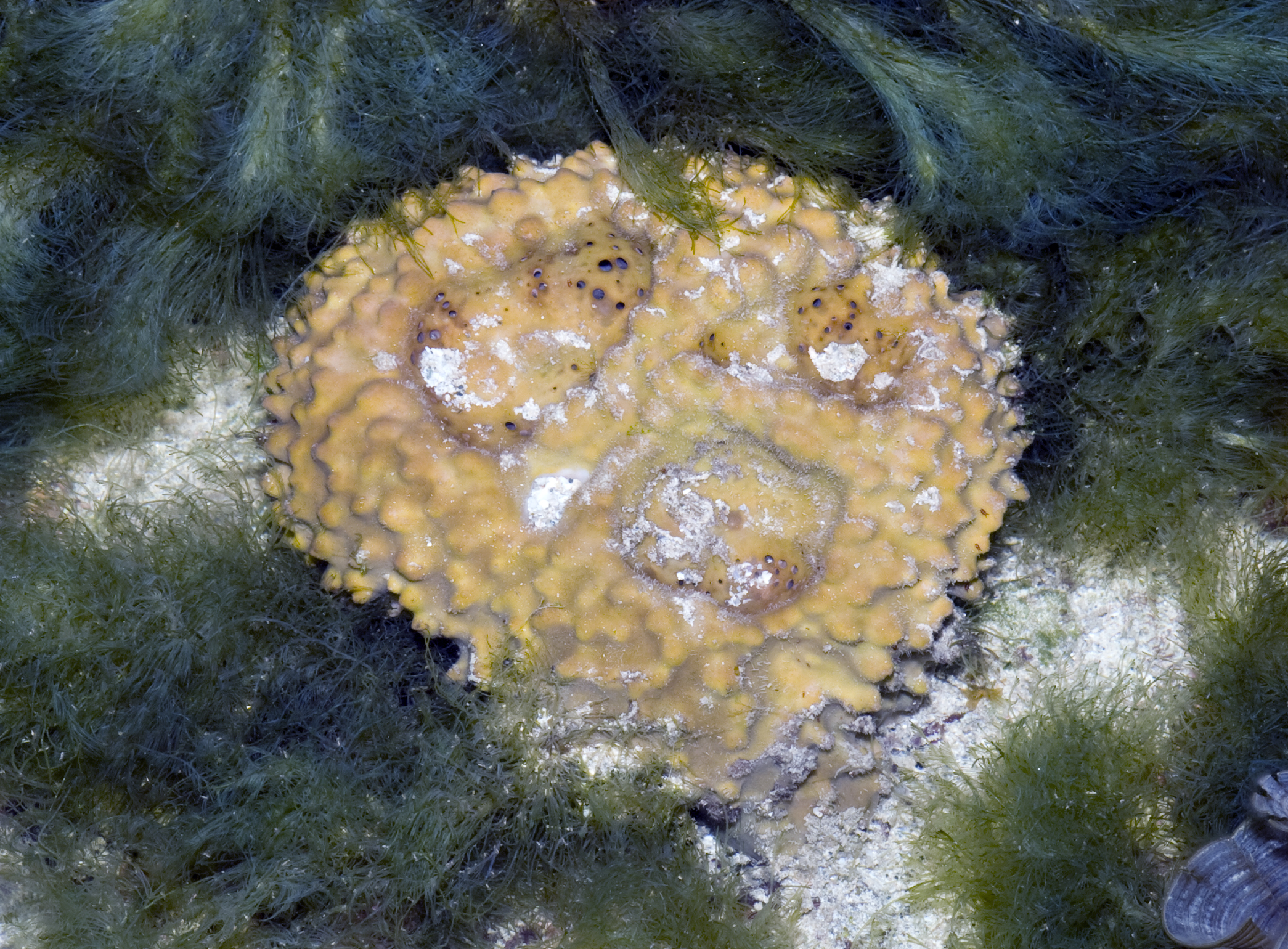
- Rhabdastrella globostellata

Scientific classification
- Domain: Eukaryota
- Kingdom: Animalia
- Phylum: Porifera
- Class: Demospongiae
- Subclass: Heteroscleromorpha
- Order: Tetractinellida; Marshall, 1876

Suborders
- Astrophorina; Spirophorina; Thoosina

Synonyms
- List: Ancorinida; Choristida; Craniellida; Dicranocladina; Megamorina; Poecillastrida; Rhizomorina; Tetracladina

= Tetractinellida =

Order of sponges

Tetractinellida is an order of sea sponges belonging to the class Demospongiae. First described in 1876, this order received a new description in 2012 and replaced the two orders Astrophorida and Spirophorida, which then became sub-orders as Astrophorina and Spirophorina.

== Families ==
Suborder Astrophorina Sollas, 1887

- Family Ancorinidae Schmidt, 1870
- Family Calthropellidae Lendenfeld, 1907
- Family Corallistidae Sollas, 1888
- Family Geodiidae Gray, 1867
- Family Isoraphiniidae Schrammen, 1924
- Family Macandrewiidae Schrammen, 1924
- Family Neopeltidae Sollas, 1888
- Family Pachastrellidae Carter, 1875
- Family Phymaraphiniidae Schrammen, 1924
- Family Phymatellidae Schrammen, 1910
- Family Pleromidae Sollas, 1888
- Family Theneidae Carter, 1883
- Family Theonellidae Lendenfeld, 1903
- Family Thrombidae Sollas, 1888
- Family Vulcanellidae Cárdenas, Xavier, Reveillaud, Schander & Rapp, 2011

Suborder Spirophorina Bergquist & Hogg, 1969

- Family Azoricidae Sollas, 1888
- Family Samidae Sollas, 1888
- Family Scleritodermidae Sollas, 1888
- Family Siphonidiidae Lendenfeld, 1903
- Family Spirasigmidae Hallmann, 1912
- Family Stupendidae Kelly & Cárdenas, 2016
- Family Tetillidae Sollas, 1886

Suborder Thoosina Carballo, Bautista-Guerrero, Cárdenas, Cruz-Barraza, Aguilar-Camacho, 2018

- Family Thoosidae Cockerell, 1925
