= List of Scarites species =

This is a list of 199 species in Scarites, a genus of ground beetles in the family Carabidae.

== Scarites species ==
Subgenus Orientolobus Dostal, 1996
Scarites beesoni Andrewes, 1929
Scarites birmanicus (Bates, 1892)
Scarites lucidus (Chaudoir, 1881)
Scarites modestus (Chaudoir, 1881)
Scarites sexualis Bänninger, 1938
Scarites stygicus (Chaudoir, 1881)
Scarites vilhenai (Basilewsky, 1955)
Scarites wittei (Bänninger, 1933)
Subgenus Parallelomorphus Motschulsky, 1849
Scarites acutidens Chaudoir, 1855
Scarites aterrimus A.Morawitz, 1863
Scarites cultripalpis Quedenfeldt, 1883
Scarites discoidalis Bänninger, 1938
Scarites inconspicuus Chaudoir, 1855
Scarites indus Olivier, 1795
Scarites laevigatus Fabricius, 1792
Scarites mandli Jedlicka, 1963
Scarites nitidulus Klug, 1862
Scarites punctum Wiedemann, 1823
Scarites quadripunctatus Dejean, 1825
Scarites semicircularis W.S.MacLeay, 1825
Scarites subcylindricus Chaudoir, 1843
Scarites subnitens Chaudoir, 1855
Scarites terricola Bonelli, 1813
Subgenus Scarites Fabricius, 1775

Scarites abbreviatus Dejean, 1825
Scarites aestuans Klug, 1853
Scarites afghanus Jedlicka, 1967
Scarites angulifrons Chaudoir, 1881
Scarites angustesulcatus Baehr, 2002
Scarites angustus (Chaudoir, 1855)
Scarites anomalus Andrewes, 1930
Scarites anthracinus Dejean, 1831
Scarites atronitens Fairmaire, 1887
Scarites baenningeri Emden, 1932
Scarites barbarus Dejean, 1825
Scarites basiplicatus Heyden, 1884
Scarites batesi Andrewes, 1929
Scarites bengalensis Dejean, 1826
Scarites biangulatus Fairmaire, 1898
Scarites bokalensis Bänninger, 1932
Scarites bottegoi Bänninger, 1937
Scarites boucardi Chaudoir, 1881
Scarites bruchi Bänninger, 1932
Scarites bucida (Pallas, 1776)
Scarites buparius (Forster, 1771)
Scarites cayennensis Dejean, 1825
Scarites ceylonicus Chaudoir, 1881
Scarites colossus Csiki, 1927
Scarites comoricus Alluaud, 1932
Scarites corbetti Andrewes, 1929
Scarites cormoides Andrewes, 1929
Scarites costipennis Péringuey, 1896
Scarites crassus Andrewes, 1929
Scarites cycloderus Chaudoir, 1881
Scarites cyclops Crotch, 1871
Scarites cylindriformis Bänninger, 1933
Scarites cylindronotus Faldermann, 1836
Scarites defletus Bänninger, 1933
Scarites denticulatus Chaudoir, 1881
Scarites derogatus Andrewes, 1929
Scarites distinguendus Chaudoir, 1855
Scarites doguereaui Gory, 1833
Scarites dubiosus Andrewes, 1929
Scarites dyschromus Chaudoir, 1855
Scarites edentatus Bänninger, 1932
Scarites emarginatus Herbst, 1806
Scarites epaphius Chaudoir, 1881
Scarites estriatus Fairmaire, 1887
Scarites exaratus Dejean, 1825
Scarites excavatus Kirby, 1819
Scarites fairmairei Bänninger, 1933
Scarites fatuus Karsch, 1881
Scarites feanus Bänninger, 1937
Scarites ferus Bänninger, 1933
Scarites fletcheri Andrewes, 1929
Scarites granulatus Andrewes, 1929
Scarites guineensis Dejean, 1831
Scarites heterogrammus Perty, 1830
Scarites hypsipus Alluaud, 1917
Scarites illustris Chaudoir, 1881
Scarites impressus Fabricius, 1801
Scarites inaequalis Fairmaire, 1893
Scarites jakli Bulirsch, 2017
Scarites kabakovi (Dostal, 1997)
Scarites klapperichi Bänninger, 1956
Scarites limitaneus Andrewes, 1932
Scarites linearis Boheman, 1848
Scarites liopterus Chaudoir, 1881
Scarites liostracus Alluaud, 1930
Scarites lissopterus Chaudoir, 1881
Scarites lomaensis Basilewsky, 1972
Scarites longiusculus Chaudoir, 1881
Scarites lubricipennis Minowa, 1932
Scarites lunicollis Bänninger, 1933
Scarites madagascariensis Dejean, 1831
Scarites malangensis Quedenfeldt, 1883
Scarites mandarinus Bänninger, 1928
Scarites mandibularis Andrewes, 1929
Scarites marinus Nichols, 1986
Scarites mayumbensis Bänninger, 1933
Scarites melanarius Dejean, 1831
Scarites migiurtinus G.Müller, 1944
Scarites minowai Habu, 1947
Scarites natalensis Boheman, 1848
Scarites nigritus Boheman, 1848
Scarites nitens Andrewes, 1929
Scarites nitidiceps Baehr, 2002
Scarites ocalensis Nichols, 1986
Scarites orthomus Chaudoir, 1855
Scarites palawanensis Bulirsch, 2017
Scarites paraguayensis Bänninger, 1928
Scarites parallelus Dejean, 1825
Scarites passaloides Quedenfeldt, 1883
Scarites patroclus Murray, 1857
Scarites patruelis LeConte, 1845
Scarites perplexus Dejean, 1825
Scarites pinguis Andrewes, 1929
Scarites politus Bonelli, 1813
Scarites polyphemus Herbst, 1806
Scarites praedator Chaudoir, 1881
Scarites procerus Dejean, 1825
Scarites productus Bänninger, 1933
Scarites quadratus Fabricius, 1801
Scarites quadriceps Chaudoir, 1843
Scarites quadricostis Chaudoir, 1881
Scarites raptor Andrewes, 1932
Scarites reductus Bänninger, 1933
Scarites retusus Andrewes, 1929
Scarites richteri Chaudoir, 1847
Scarites rugiceps Wiedemann, 1823
Scarites rugosus Wiedemann, 1821
Scarites salinus Dejean, 1825
Scarites saxicola Bonelli, 1813
Scarites scaevus Andrewes, 1929
Scarites selene Schmidt-Goebel, 1846
Scarites senegalensis Dejean, 1825
Scarites similis Chaudoir, 1881
Scarites simogonus Chaudoir, 1881
Scarites stenodes Andrewes, 1929
Scarites stenops Bousquet & Skelley, 2010
Scarites striatus Dejean, 1825
Scarites strigifrons Baehr, 2002
Scarites subpatroclus Basilewsky, 1972
Scarites subrugatus Chaudoir, 1881
Scarites subterraneus Fabricius, 1775
Scarites sulcatus Olivier, 1795
Scarites tauropus Andrewes, 1929
Scarites tenebricosus Dejean, 1831
Scarites texanus Chaudoir, 1881
Scarites timorensis Bänninger, 1949
Scarites trachydermon Andrewes, 1936
Scarites turkestanicus Heyden, 1884
Scarites unicus Minowa, 1932
Scarites urbanus Minowa, 1932
Scarites vicinus Chaudoir, 1843
Scarites zambo Steinheil, 1875

Subgenus Taeniolobus Chaudoir, 1855

Scarites aberrans Bänninger, 1941
Scarites bonariensis (Chaudoir, 1881)
Scarites carinatus Dejean, 1825
Scarites convexipennis Fairmaire, 1869
Scarites convexiusculus (Chaudoir, 1881)
Scarites corvinus Dejean, 1831
Scarites cubanus (Bänninger, 1937)
Scarites deplanatus (Bänninger, 1937)
Scarites dubius Bänninger, 1941
Scarites ecuadorensis Bänninger, 1941
Scarites furcatus Bänninger, 1941
Scarites giachinoi (Bulirsch, 2019)
Scarites gratus (Chaudoir, 1855)
Scarites guerini (Chaudoir, 1855)
Scarites holcocranius (Chaudoir, 1881)
Scarites interpositus (Bänninger, 1933)
Scarites lebasii (Chaudoir, 1855)
Scarites meridionalis Bänninger, 1941
Scarites moreti (Bulirsch, 2021)
Scarites multisetosus Bänninger, 1941
Scarites oberthueri Bänninger, 1938
Scarites obliteratus Bänninger, 1941
Scarites onorei (Bulirsch, 2019)
Scarites planatus Dejean, 1831
Scarites planiusculus (Chaudoir, 1855)
Scarites pronotalis Bänninger, 1941
Scarites reichei (Chaudoir, 1881)
Scarites rugatus (Chaudoir, 1881)
Scarites rugicollis Dejean, 1825
Scarites schubarti Bänninger, 1939
Scarites seriepunctatus (Bänninger, 1933)
Scarites setosus Bänninger, 1941
Scarites silvestris Laporte, 1835
Scarites spectabilis (Chaudoir, 1881)
Scarites subcostatus (Chaudoir, 1881)
Scarites subsulcatus Dejean, 1831
Scarites sulciceps (Chaudoir, 1855)
Scarites sulcifrons (Chaudoir, 1855)
Scarites thiemei (Bänninger, 1933)
Scarites vilcanotanus (Bänninger, 1932)
Scarites zikani Bänninger, 1941

Extinct, not assigned to subgenus
†Scarites haidingeri Heer, 1861
†Scarites mancus Zhang; Liu & Shangguan, 1989
†Scarites robustiventris Theobald, 1937
