= Cimensis =

Cimensis is a Latin adjective meaning "from Cima", referring to either Ilhéu de Cima of Cape Verde or Ilhéu de Cima of Madeira. It may refer to several species:

- Amphorella cimensis, a species of snails found in Madeira
- Esperiopsis cimensis, a species of sponges found in Cape Verde
- Nesarpalus cimensis, a species of beetles found in Madeira
- Pseudococcus cimensis, a species of mealy bugs found in Madeira

It also may refer to a subspecies:

- Scarites abbreviatus cimensis, a subspecies of Scarites abbreviatus found in Madeira
