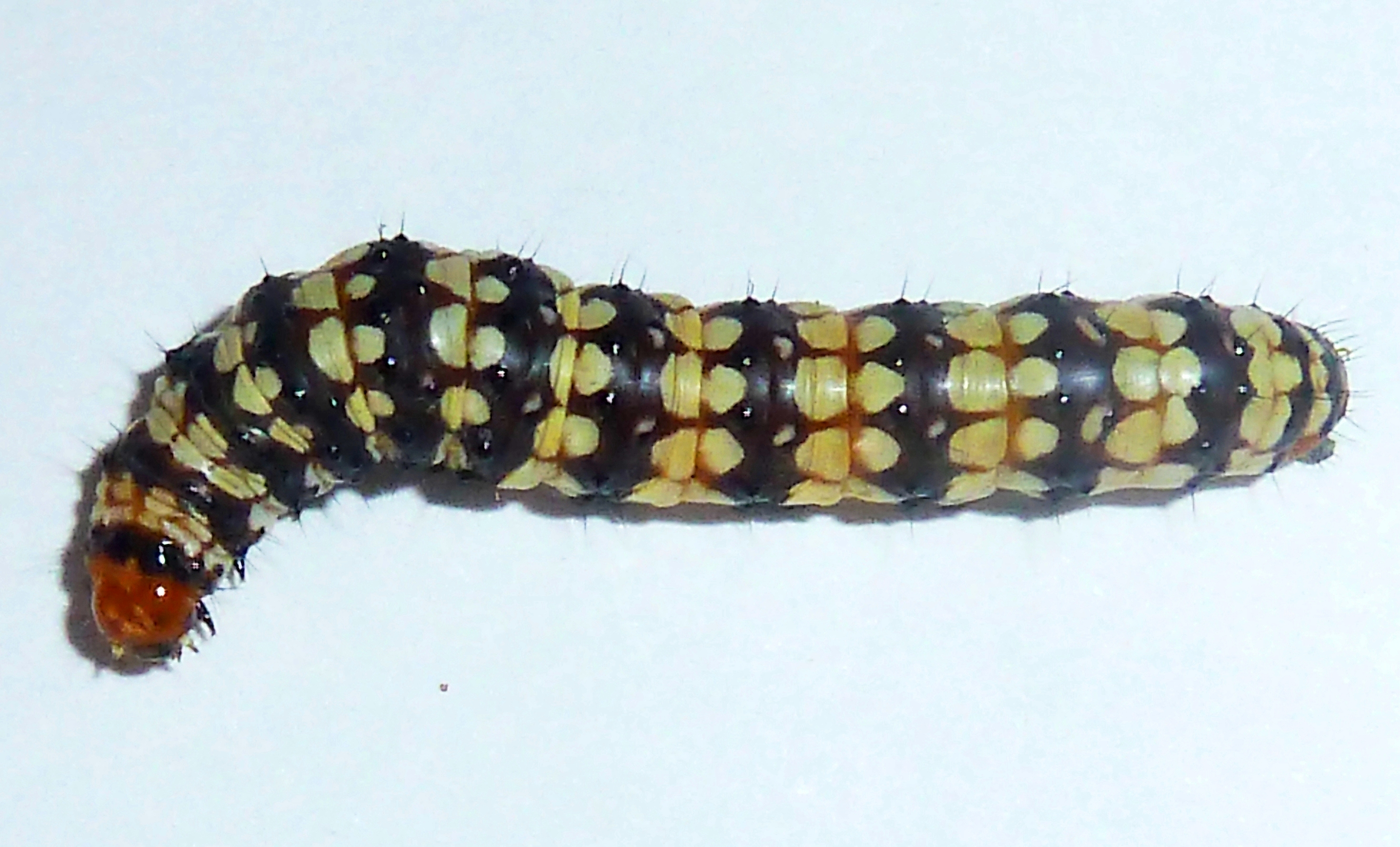
- Larva
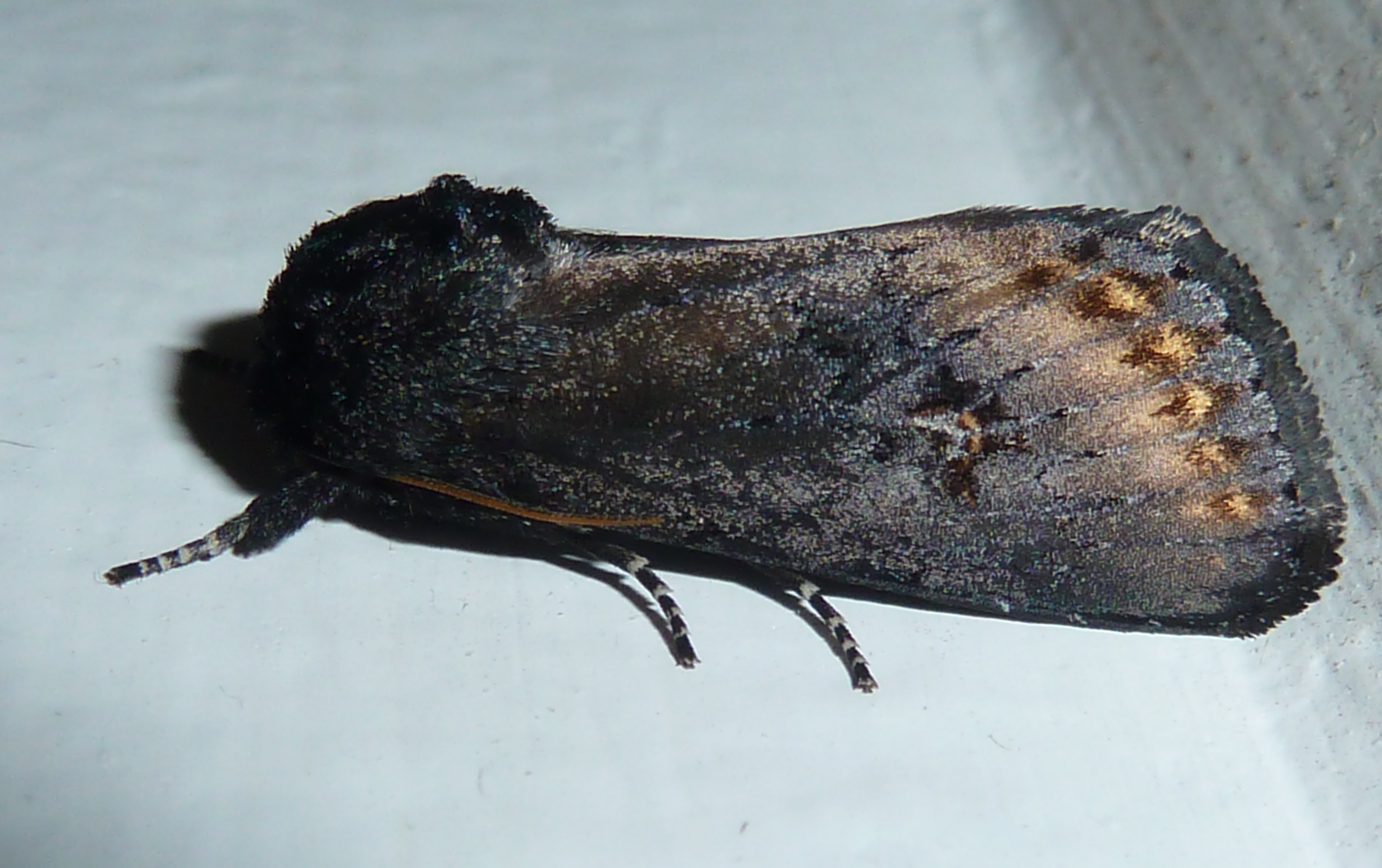
- Adult

Scientific classification
- Kingdom: Animalia
- Phylum: Arthropoda
- Class: Insecta
- Order: Lepidoptera
- Superfamily: Noctuoidea
- Family: Noctuidae
- Genus: Brithys
- Species: B. crini

Binomial name
- Brithys crini (Fabricius, 1775)

Synonyms
- Bombyx crini; Phalaena dominica; Noctua pancratii; Noctua encausta; Brithys vertenteni; Brithys nipponica; Brithys encausta; Brithys pancratii; Glottula pancrati

= Brithys crini =

Amaryllis borer

Species of moth

Brithys crini, the amaryllis borer, crinum borer, lily borer or Kew arches, is a moth of the family Noctuidae. It is a garden pest in parts of its range, as their larvae damage the stems and leaves of lilies, especially lilies of the family Amaryllidaceae.

== Range ==
It is found in the coastal areas of Southern Europe and North Africa, south to South Africa. Furthermore, it is found in Japan and in Queensland and Northern Territory in Australia towards India and Sri Lanka.

== Description ==
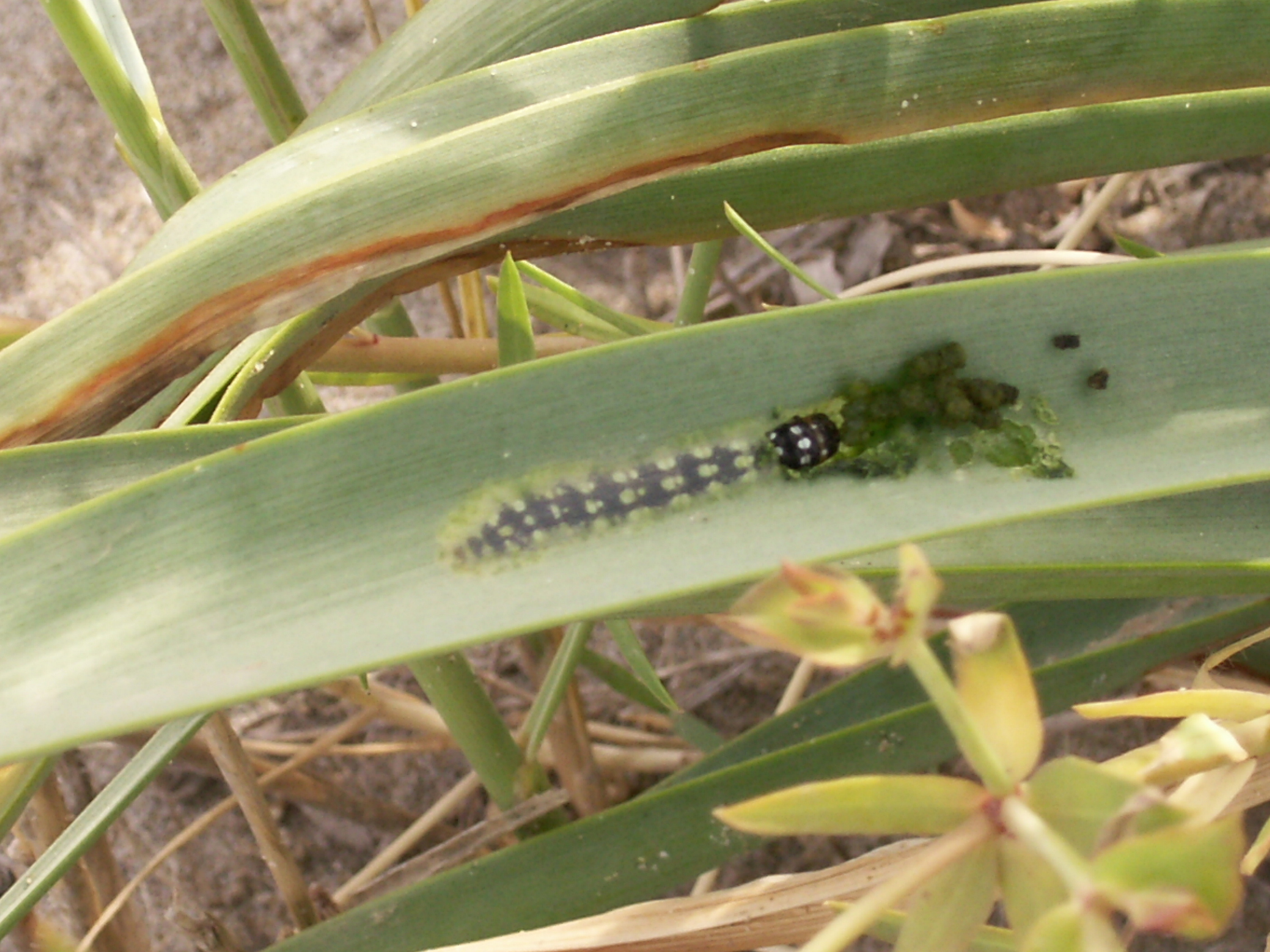
Larva boring into a sea daffodil leaf

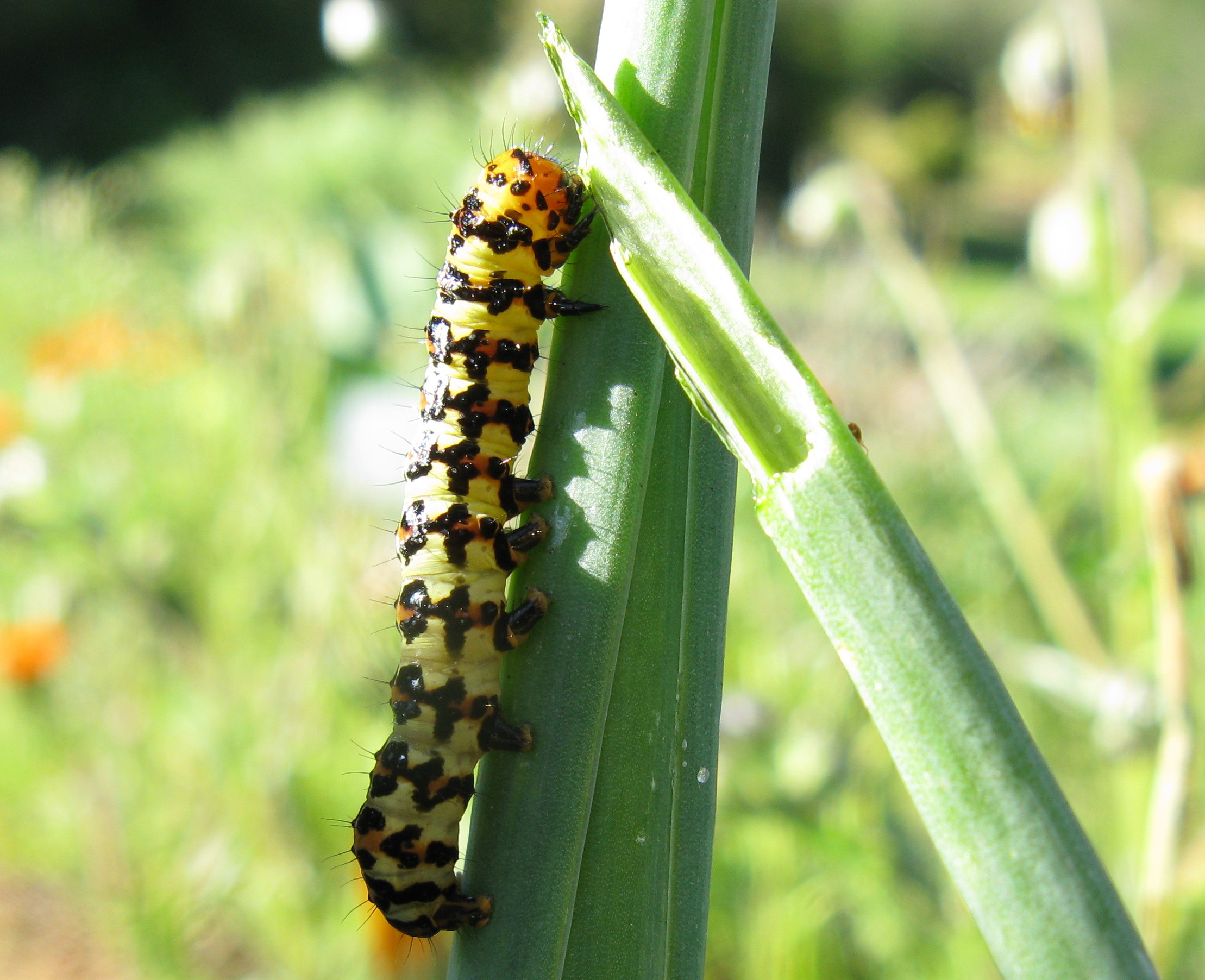
Larva feeding on a slime lily stem

The wingspan of the moth is about 40 mm. Its head, thorax and forewings are very dark brown, but paler toward the wingtips. Sub-basal, median and postmedial indistinct waved lines are black. A curved submarginal ochreous line with ferrous colored lunules found on each side of it. There is a marginal black lunule series. The hindwings are practically white. Tarsi bear black and white stripes. In Europe the adults are on the wing in July.

== Life stages ==
There are several generations per year, though development slows down in cooler seasons, when the larvae sometimes overwinter by boring into the bulbs of the host plants.

The moth lays clusters of a few dozen eggs on the host plant leaves. The hatching larvae at first remain in groups and mine into the leaves. As they grow they either emerge and feed externally, or proceed down the leaves to their bases or even into the bulbs.

The larvae are aposematically coloured in pale yellows on blacks and browns. They are unpalatable to most vertebrate predators, and also poisonous, feeding as they do, on largely unpalatable and poisonous plants. They are slightly bristly, but the bristles seem to be sensory rather than irritant. Typically they grow to about 40 mm long before pupation.

== Food plants ==
The larvae feed on all species of Crinum, Clivia and Hippeastrum, including Crinum angustifolium, Haemanthus species, Hippeastrum procerum, Pancratium maritimum, Zephyranthes candida, Crocus tommasinianus, Narcissus spp., and Amaryllis belladonna. Commonly they bore into thick leaves or even into the bulbs; Mature larvae are likely to feed externally, especially on thin-leaved plants. Heavy infestations of the caterpillars may kill plants.

== Predators ==
The most effective enemies of the larvae in Europe are the carabid (ground beetle) Scarites buparius and the tenebrionid (darkling beetles) Erodius siculus and Pimelia bipunctata.

== Control ==
Commercial carbaryl dusts are effective in combating the caterpillar, but they cannot reach those that have bored into the plant. The insecticide also reduces populations of predators, so that weekly applications become necessary. For small scale horticulture, or in home gardens it is better to rely on mechanical control, seeking out discoloured feeding patches on leaves and crushing the young larvae before they develop. Heavily infested leaves it often is better to cut out and destroy.
