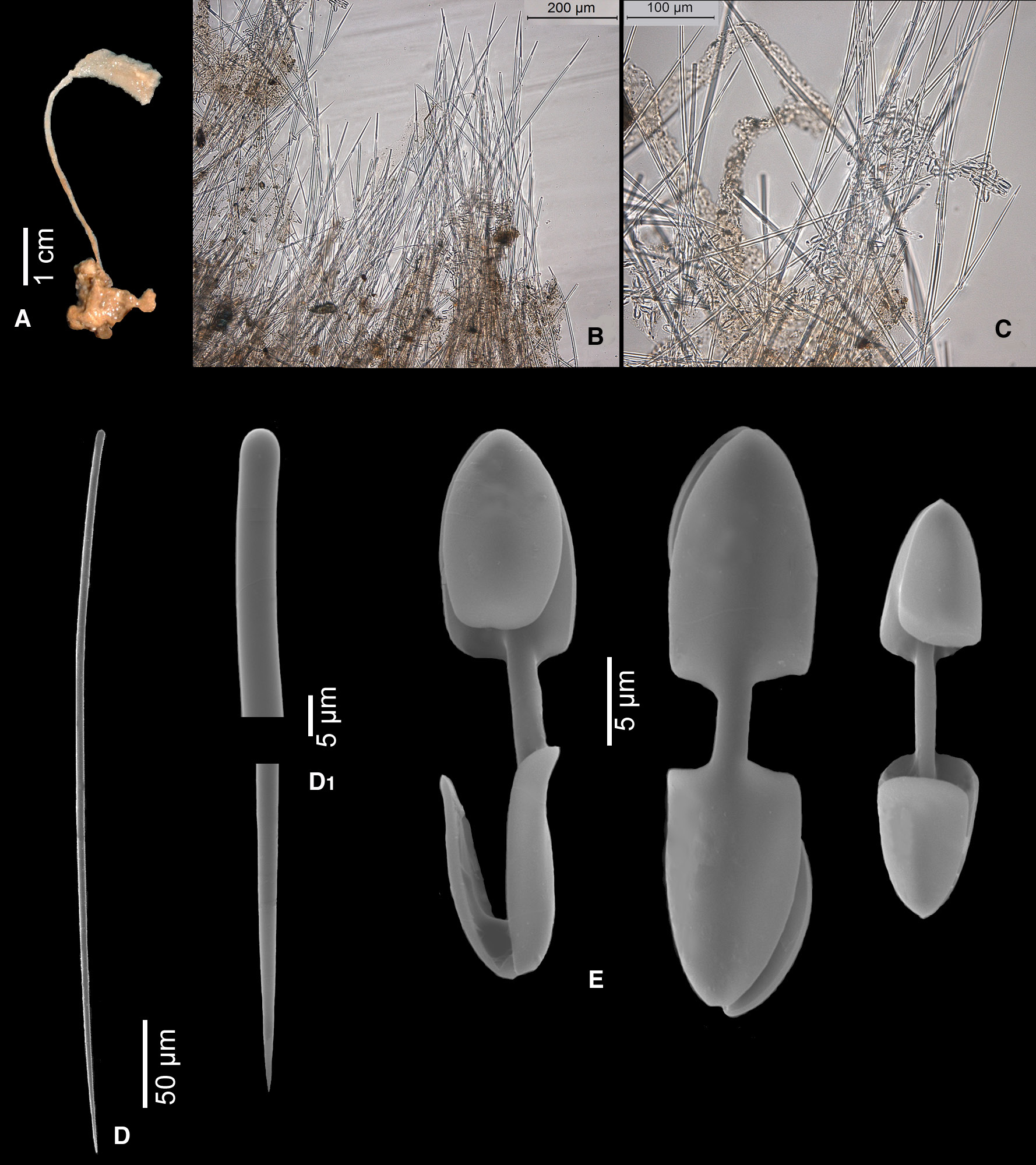
- Amphilectus strepsichelifer sp. nov., Holotype ZMA Por. 07564. A. Habit. B-C. Cross section of skeleton in light microscopy. B. Peripheral skeleton. C. Detail of peripheral tracts and clustered microscleres. D-E. SEM images of spicules. D. Style. D1. Details of apices. E. Palmate isochelae, in various stages of torsion.

Scientific classification
- Kingdom: Animalia
- Phylum: Porifera
- Class: Demospongiae
- Order: Poecilosclerida
- Family: Esperiopsidae
- Genus: Amphilectus
- Species: A. strepsichelifer

Binomial name
- Amphilectus strepsichelifer van Soest, Beglinger & de Voogd, 2012

= Amphilectus strepsichelifer =

Species of sponge

Amphilectus strepsichelifer is a species of demosponges found in the Atlantic waters around Cape Verde, western Africa. The species name is a combination of the Latin strepsis = twisted, and chelifer = bearing chelae, reflecting the twisted condition of the chelae.

The species was discovered in 1986 in the waters of Canal de São Vicente, west of São Vicente, at about 350 m depth, on hard bottom. This is the only place where it has been observed.
