= Esperiopsis plumosa =

Scientific classification
- Kingdom: Animalia
- Phylum: Porifera
- Class: Demospongiae
- Order: Poecilosclerida
- Family: Esperiopsidae
- Genus: Esperiopsis
- Species: E. plumosa

Binomial name
- Esperiopsis plumosa Tanita, 1965

Species of sponge

Esperiopsis plumosa is a species of demosponge, first described in 1965 by Senji Tanita.

It is found off various islands in the Sea of Japan.
