= Corybas =

Corybas may refer to:

- Corybas, a genus of orchid
- Corybas, a character in Greek mythology
- Corybas, a synonym for a genus of sponges (Amphilectus)
