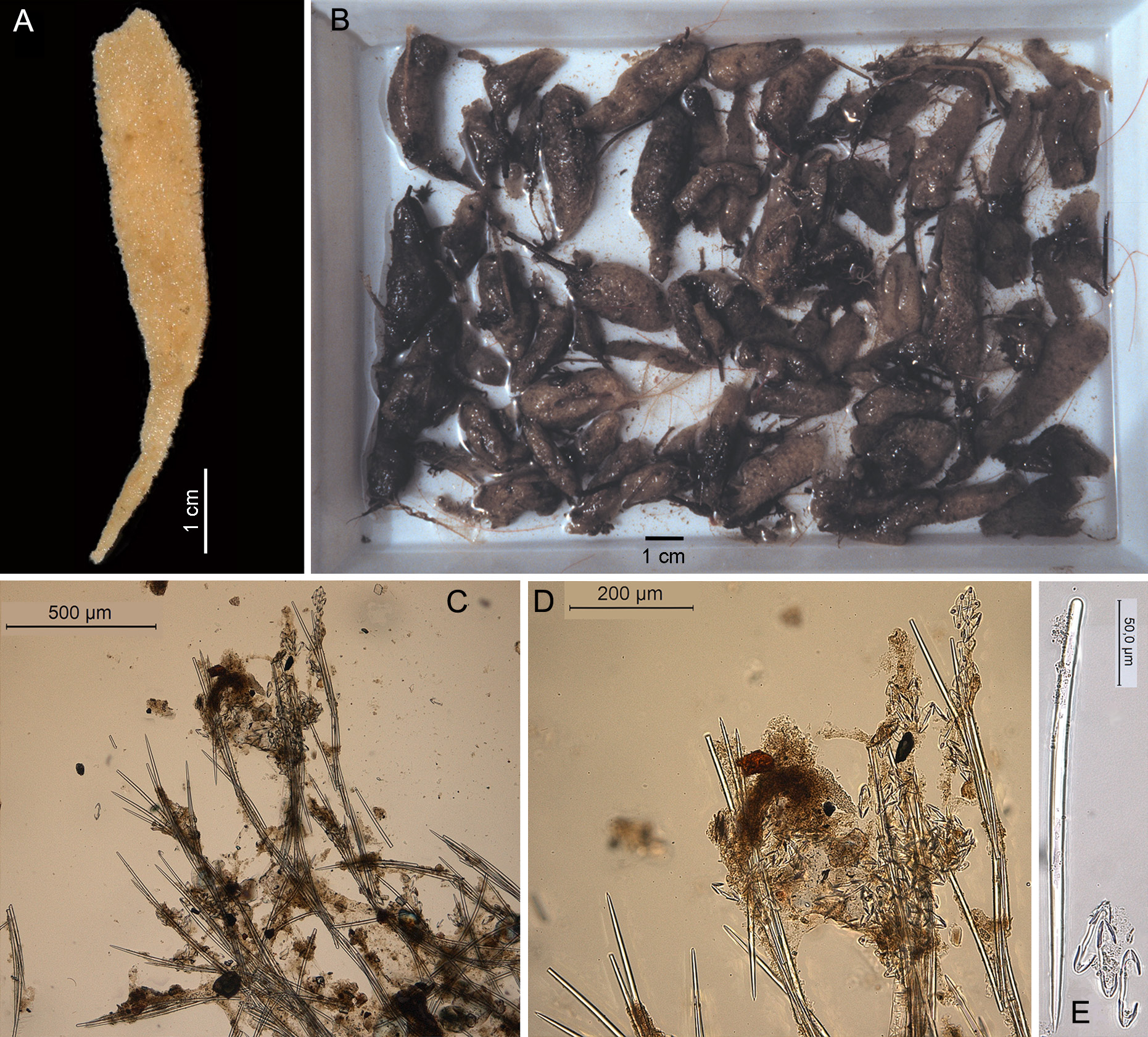
- Amphilectus utriculus sp. nov. A,C-E. Holotype ZMA Por. 22592. B. Paratypes ZMA Por. 06636. C. Cross section showing skeletal structure. D. Peripheral skeleton showing protruding spicule tracts and clusters of microscleres. E. Spicules in light microscopy.

Scientific classification
- Kingdom: Animalia
- Phylum: Porifera
- Class: Demospongiae
- Order: Poecilosclerida
- Family: Esperiopsidae
- Genus: Amphilectus
- Species: A. utriculus

Binomial name
- Amphilectus utriculus van Soest, Beglinger & de Voogd, 2012

= Amphilectus utriculus =

Species of sponge

Amphilectus utriculus is a species of demosponges found in the Atlantic waters west of Mauritania, western Africa. The species name utriculus is Latin for "small water bag", referring to the hollow, flattened shape.

The species was discovered in 1988 in the waters southwest of Cap Timiris in Mauritania, at about 270 m depth, on muddy bottom. It has been observed in several other locations near Cap Timiris.
