= Lilac beauty =

Lilac beauty may refer to:

- 'Lilac Beauty', a cultivar of Crocus tommasinianus
- Lilac beauty (Apeira syringaria), a moth in the family Geometridae found throughout Europe
- Lilac beauty (Salamis cacta), a butterfly in the family Nymphalidae found in Africa
