= Ruby Giant =

Ruby Giant may refer to:

- a purple coneflower (Echinacea purpurea) cultivar
- an early crocus (Crocus tommasinianus) cultivar
