= Ilhéu de Cima Lighthouse =

- Location: Ilhéu de Cima; Cape Verde
- Coordinates: 14°57′54.5″N 24°38′30.8″W

Tower
- Construction: mason tower
- Height: 4 metres (13 ft)
- Shape: quadrangular tower with lantern
- Markings: white tower and lantern

Light
- Focal height: 80 metres (260 ft)
- Range: 9 nautical miles (17 km; 10 mi)
- Characteristic: Fl (3) W 12s.
- Cape Verde no.: PT-2190

Ilhéu de Cima Lighthouse (Portuguese: Farol do Ilhéu de Cima) is a lighthouse on Ilhéu de Cima located about 80 m above sea level. The lighthouse is the only building inside the integral nature reserve Ilhéus do Rombo.

It is a small white tower 4 meters in height with a white lantern, the lighthouse is solar powered. The caretaker's house is next door. It flashes white lights every 12 seconds, its range is 9 nmi (17 km).

== See also ==
- List of lighthouses in Cape Verde
