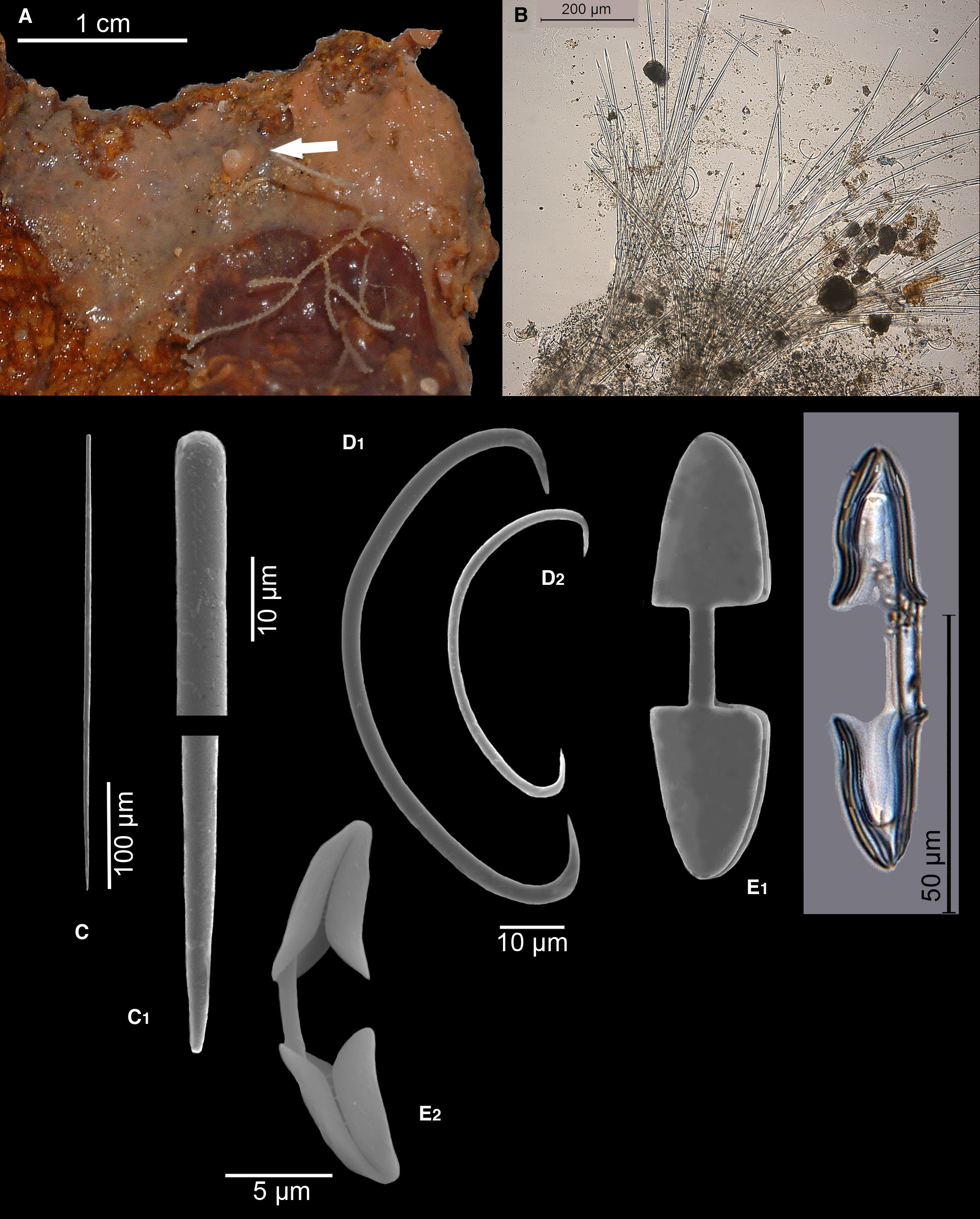
- Esperiopsis cimensis sp. nov., Holotype ZMA Por. 07282. A. Habit encrusting a volcanic rock (indicated by arrow). B. Cross section of peripheral skeleton showing plumose spicule brushes. C-E. SEM and light microscopy images of spicules. D. Style. D1. Detail of apices. C. Sigmas. C1. Large sigma. C2. Small sigma. E. Palmate isochelae. E1. Left: large chela in dorsal view; right: large chela in side view. E2. Small chela.

Scientific classification
- Kingdom: Animalia
- Phylum: Porifera
- Class: Demospongiae
- Order: Poecilosclerida
- Family: Esperiopsidae
- Genus: Esperiopsis
- Species: E. cimensis

Binomial name
- Esperiopsis cimensis van Soest, Beglinger & de Voogd, 2012

= Esperiopsis cimensis =

Species of sponge

Esperiopsis cimensis is a species of demosponges found in the Atlantic waters around Cape Verde, western Africa. The species name is named after the type locality, Ilhéu de Cima.

The species was discovered in 1986 in the waters southeast of Ilhéu de Cima, one of the Ilhéus do Rombo, north of the island Brava, at 165 m depth, on hard bottom with yellow calcareous sand. This is the only place where it has been observed.
