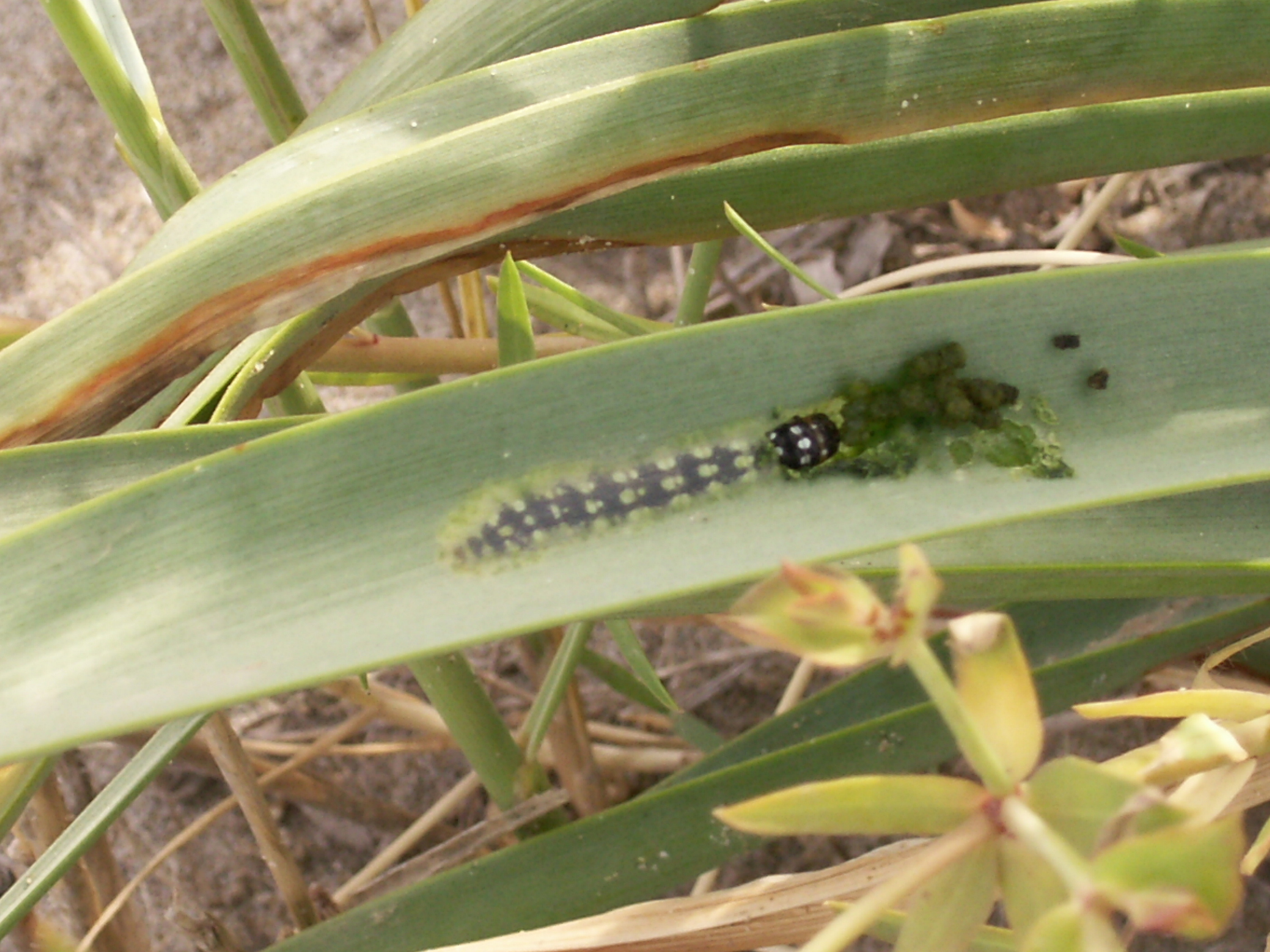
- Brithys crini

Scientific classification
- Kingdom: Animalia
- Phylum: Arthropoda
- Clade: Pancrustacea
- Class: Insecta
- Order: Lepidoptera
- Superfamily: Noctuoidea
- Family: Noctuidae
- Genus: Brithys; Hübner, 1821

= Brithys =

Genus of moths

Brithys is a genus of moths of the family Noctuidae. It includes three species.

== Species ==
- Brithys crini – Lily Borer Fabricius, 1775
