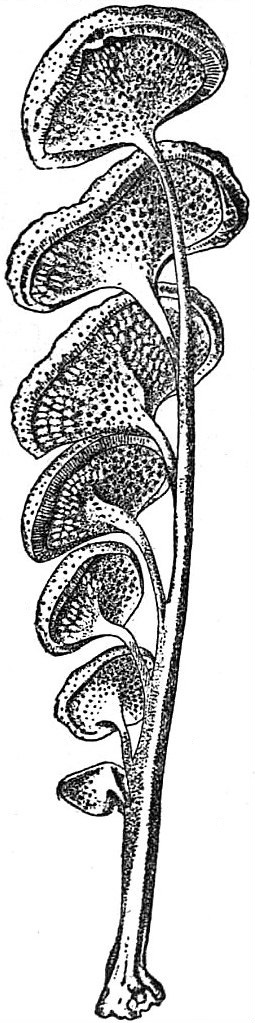
- Esperiopsis challengeri

Scientific classification
- Kingdom: Animalia
- Phylum: Porifera
- Class: Demospongiae
- Order: Poecilosclerida
- Family: Esperiopsidae
- Genus: Esperiopsis; Carter, 1882

Type species
- Esperiopsis villosa (Carter, 1874)

Species
- See text

Synonyms
- Mycalopsis Topsent, 1927

= Esperiopsis =

Genus of sponges

Esperiopsis is a genus of demosponges, comprising around 30 species found in oceans around the world.

The genus was first described in 1882 by Henry John Carter.

== Species ==
As of 2020, the following species of Esperiopsis are recognized as valid by WoRMS:

- Esperiopsis bathyalis Lopes & Hajdu, 2004
- Esperiopsis challengeri (Ridley, 1885)
- Esperiopsis chindoensis Sim, 1995
- Esperiopsis cimensis van Soest, Beglinger & De Voogd, 2012
- Esperiopsis crassofibrosa Brøndsted, 1924
- Esperiopsis decora Topsent, 1904
- Esperiopsis diasolenia Lévi, 1993
- Esperiopsis ferruginea Whitelegge, 1906
- Esperiopsis flagellum Lundbeck, 1905
- Esperiopsis flava Lévi, 1993
- Esperiopsis heardi Boury-Esnault & van Beveren, 1982
- Esperiopsis incognita Stephens, 1916
- Esperiopsis inodes Lévi, 1993
- Esperiopsis lingua (Koltun, 1970)
- Esperiopsis macrosigma Stephens, 1916
- Esperiopsis magnifolia Lévi, 1993
- Esperiopsis megachela Dendy, 1924
- Esperiopsis papillata (Vosmaer, 1880)
- Esperiopsis plumosa Tanita, 1965
- Esperiopsis praedita Topsent, 1890
- Esperiopsis profunda Ridley & Dendy, 1886
- Esperiopsis pulchella Ridley & Dendy, 1886
- Esperiopsis radiata (Topsent, 1927)
- Esperiopsis scotiae Topsent, 1915
- Esperiopsis stipula Koltun, 1958
- Esperiopsis strongylatus (Alander, 1942)
- Esperiopsis strongylophora Vacelet, 1969
- Esperiopsis varia Sarà, 1978
- Esperiopsis variussigma Hoshino, 1981
- Esperiopsis villosa (Carter, 1874)
