= Ilhéu Grande =

Island of Cape Verde

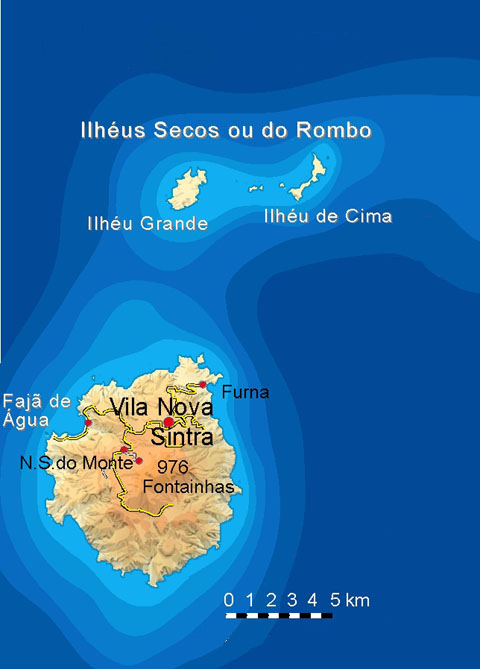

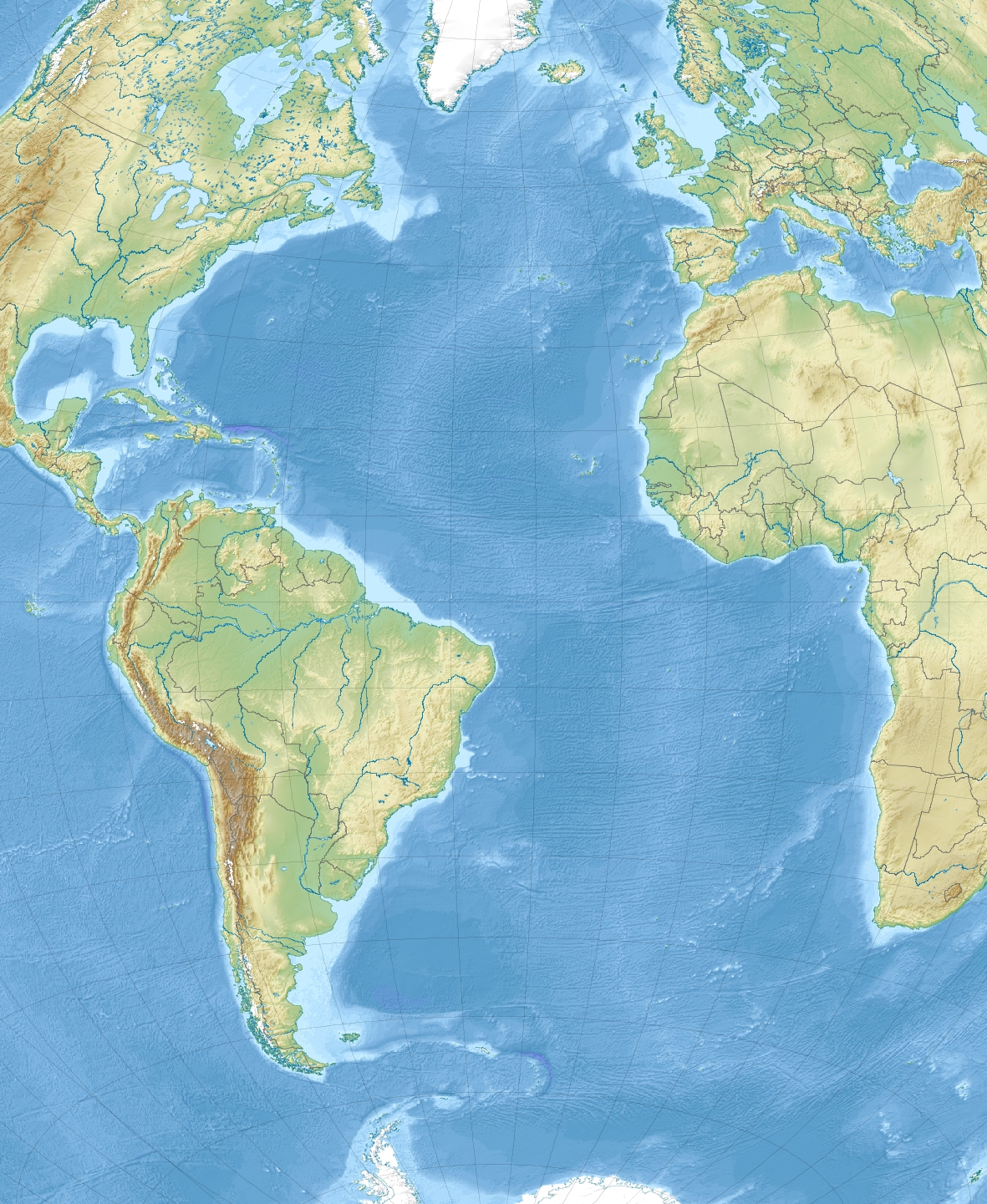
- Location within Cape Verde Location within Atlantic Ocean

Geography
- Location: Atlantic Ocean
- Coordinates: 14.965°N 24.699°W
- Area: 3 km^{2} (1.2 sq mi)
- Length: 2.3 km (1.43 mi)
- Width: 1.1 km (0.68 mi)
- Highest elevation: 96 m (315 ft)

Administration
- Cape Verde

Demographics
- Population: 0

Ilhéu Grande is an uninhabited island of Cape Verde. It is the largest of the Ilhéus do Rombo islet group, located 4 km (2 mi) west of Ilhéu de Cima, the other main islet of the group, and 7 km (4 mi) north of the island Brava. Its length is 2.3 km (1.4 mi) from southwest to northeast and the width is approximately 1.1 km (0.7 mi) from southeast to northwest. It is 96 m high. The islet forms a part of the integral nature reserve Ilhéus do Rombo.

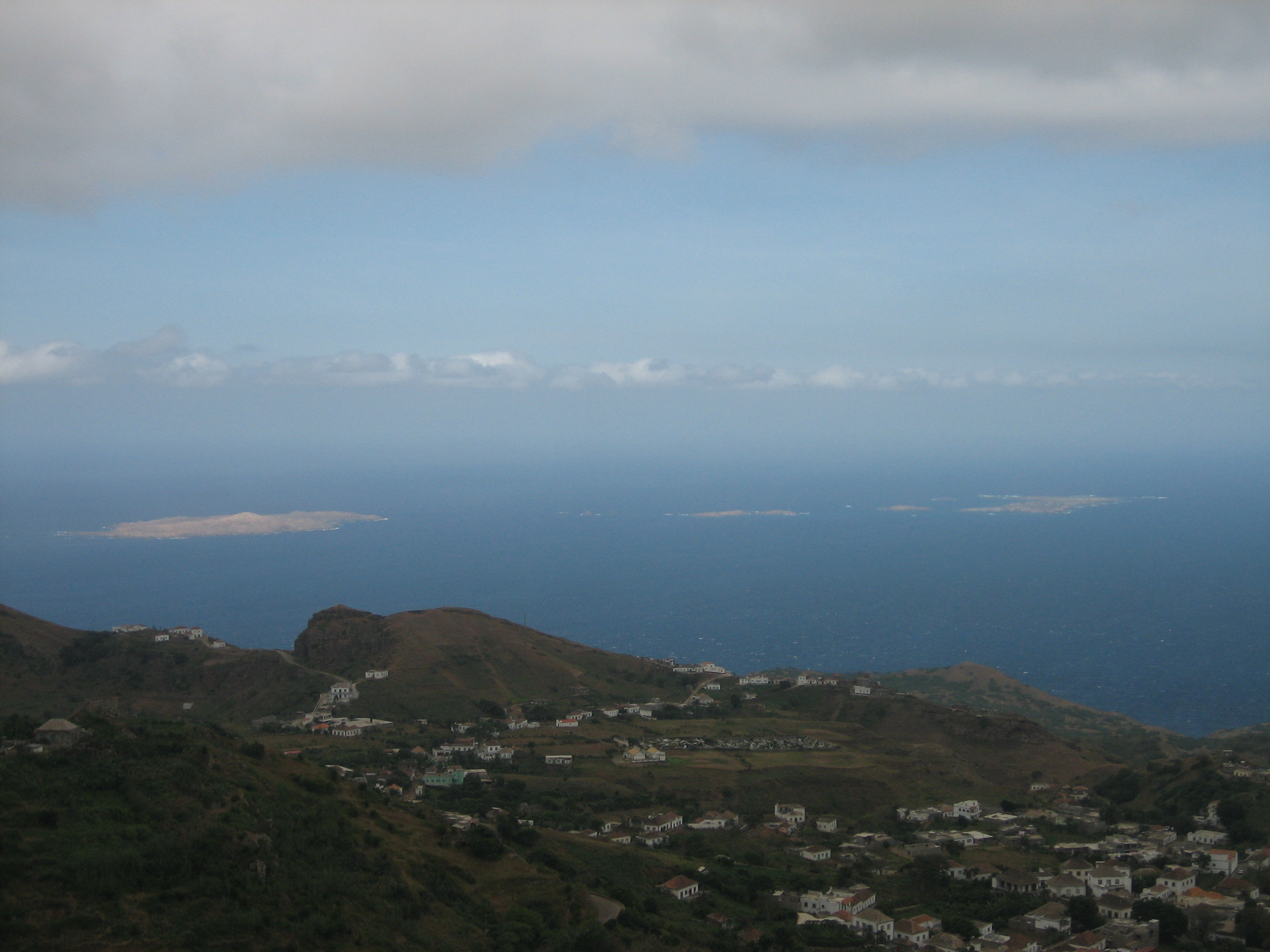
View of Ilhéus do Rombo from the middle of Brava in Nova Sintra, Ilhéu Grande is on the left

The islet is a volcanic seamount and has a rocky coastline. It is mostly barren but has some scattered vegetation. Large bird colonies must have existed formerly as the island has thick layers of guano. It has been used by goat farmers and whalers in the past. The islet was mentioned as "Juan Carnira" in the 1747 map by Jacques-Nicolas Bellin.
