= Scarites guineensis =

Scientific classification
- Kingdom: Animalia
- Phylum: Arthropoda
- Class: Insecta
- Order: Coleoptera
- Suborder: Adephaga
- Family: Carabidae
- Genus: Scarites
- Species: S. guineensis

Binomial name
- Scarites guineensis Dejean, 1831

Species of beetle

Scarites guineensis is a species of ground beetle in the family Carabidae. It is found in West Africa, including Mali.
