= Scarites marinus =

Scientific classification
- Domain: Eukaryota
- Kingdom: Animalia
- Phylum: Arthropoda
- Class: Insecta
- Order: Coleoptera
- Suborder: Adephaga
- Family: Carabidae
- Genus: Scarites
- Species: S. marinus

Binomial name
- Scarites marinus S. W. Nichols, 1986

Species of beetle

Scarites marinus is a species of ground beetle in the family Carabidae. It is found in the Caribbean Sea, Central America, and North America.
