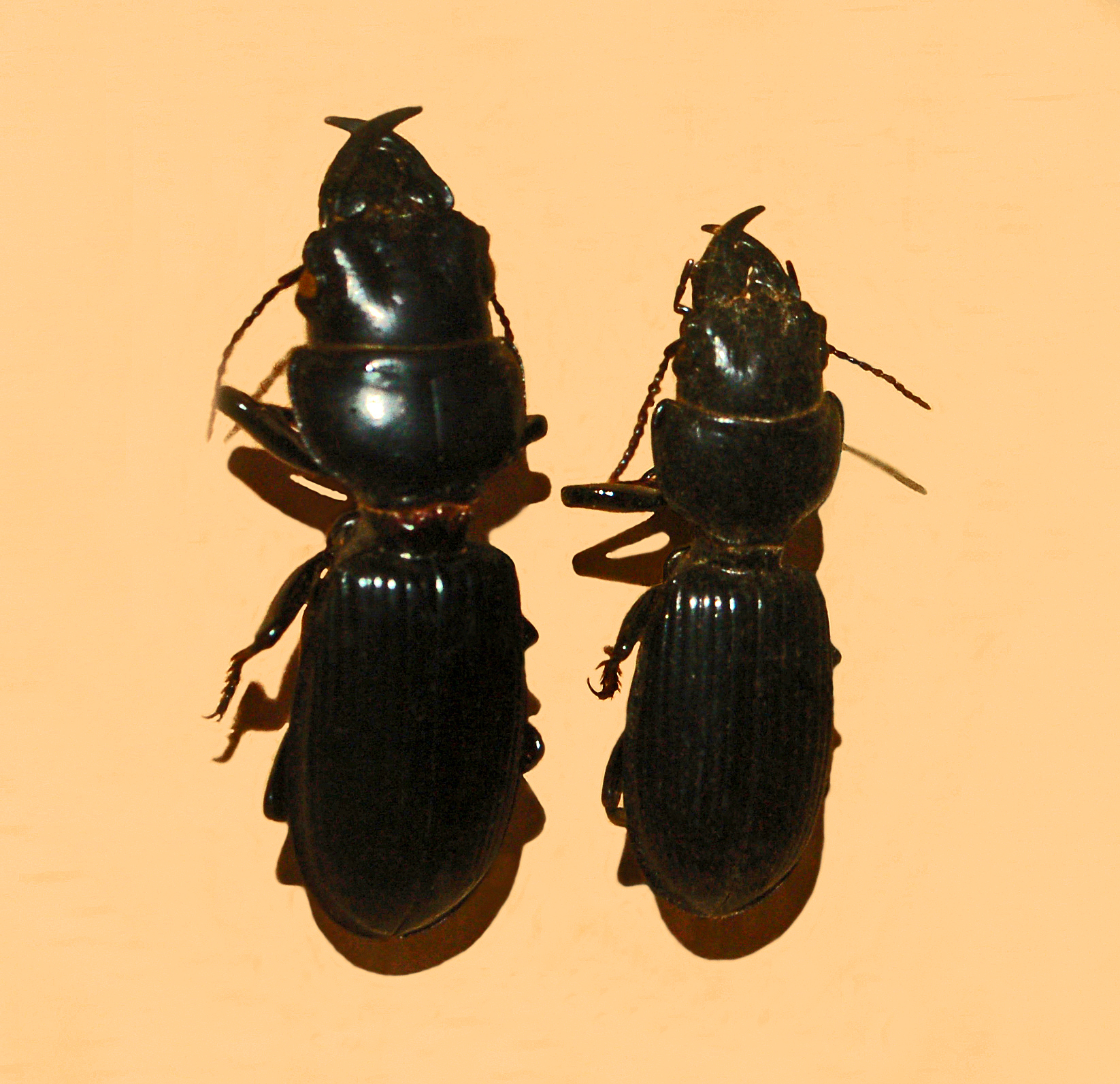
- Scarites striatus, from Tunisia

Scientific classification
- Kingdom: Animalia
- Phylum: Arthropoda
- Class: Insecta
- Order: Coleoptera
- Suborder: Adephaga
- Family: Carabidae
- Genus: Scarites
- Species: S. striatus

Binomial name
- Scarites striatus Dejean, 1825

= Scarites striatus =

Species of beetle

Scarites striatus is a species of beetles of the family Carabidae.

== Description ==
Scarites striatus can reach a length of about 35 millimetres (1.4 in).

== Distribution ==
This species occurs in Tunisia.
