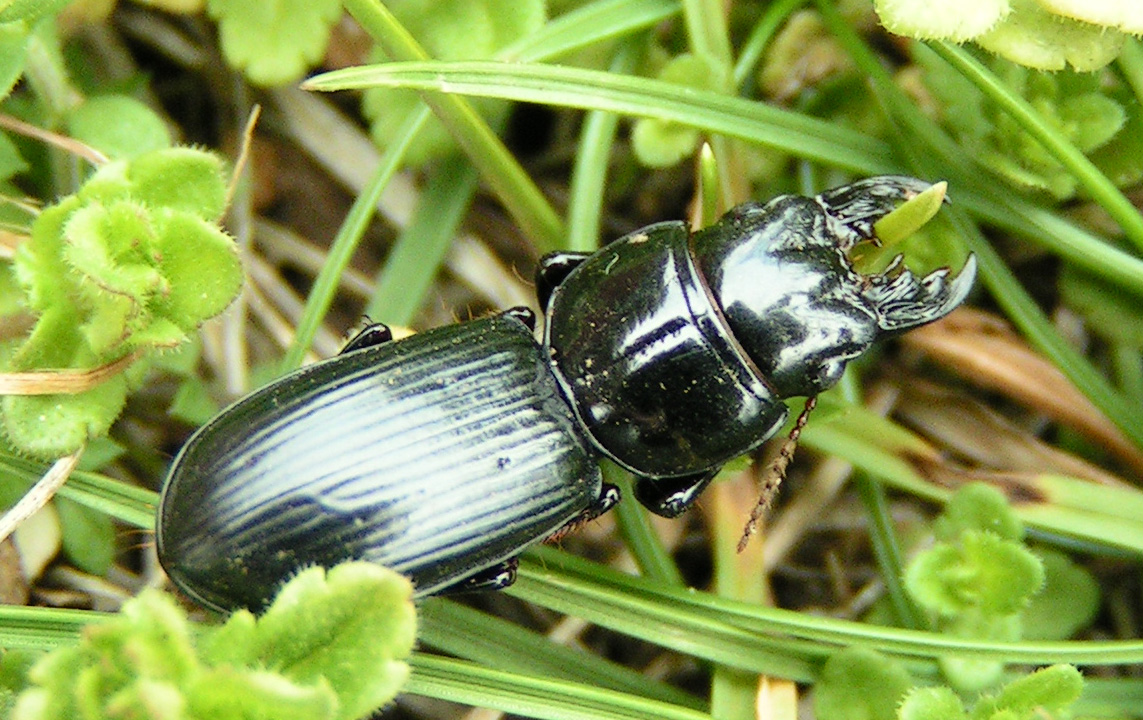

Scientific classification
- Domain: Eukaryota
- Kingdom: Animalia
- Phylum: Arthropoda
- Class: Insecta
- Order: Coleoptera
- Suborder: Adephaga
- Family: Carabidae
- Genus: Scarites
- Species: S. vicinus

Binomial name
- Scarites vicinus Chaudoir, 1843

= Scarites vicinus =

Species of beetle

Scarites vicinus is a species of ground beetle in the family Carabidae. It is found in North America.

== Anatomy ==
Scarites vicinus has a sleek, black, and large (14-30 mm) body with large mandibles. It can be distinguished from the other species within the same genus due to its rounder thorax that has the same dimensions as its head.
