= Scarites lissopterus =

Scientific classification
- Domain: Eukaryota
- Kingdom: Animalia
- Phylum: Arthropoda
- Class: Insecta
- Order: Coleoptera
- Suborder: Adephaga
- Family: Carabidae
- Genus: Scarites
- Species: S. lissopterus

Binomial name
- Scarites lissopterus Chaudoir, 1881

Species of beetle

Scarites lissopterus is a species of ground beetle in the family Carabidae. It is found in North America.
