= Amphilectus =

Scientific classification
- Kingdom: Animalia
- Phylum: Porifera
- Class: Demospongiae
- Order: Poecilosclerida
- Family: Esperiopsidae
- Genus: Amphilectus; Vosmaer, 1880

Species
- See text

Synonyms
- Brondstedia Burton, 1929; Corybas Gray, 1867

Genus of sponges

Amphilectus is a genus of demosponges, comprising around 20 species found in oceans around the world.

== Species ==
The following species are recognized in the genus Amphilectus:

- Amphilectus americanus (Ridley & Dendy, 1887)
- Amphilectus columnatus (Topsent, 1890)
- Amphilectus dactylus Goodwin, Jones, Neely & Brickle, 2011
- Amphilectus digitatus (Miklucho-Maclay, 1870)
- Amphilectus fimbriatus Goodwin, Jones, Neely & Brickle, 2016
- Amphilectus flabellatus Burton, 1932
- Amphilectus fleecei Goodwin, Jones, Neely & Brickle, 2011
- Amphilectus fucorum (Esper, 1794)
- Amphilectus glaber (Brøndsted, 1924)
- Amphilectus informis (Stephens, 1915)
- Amphilectus laxus (Lambe, 1893)
- Amphilectus lesliei (Uriz, 1988)
- Amphilectus munitus Whitelegge, 1907
- Amphilectus ovulum (Schmidt, 1870)
- Amphilectus pedicellatus (Lundbeck, 1905)
- Amphilectus rugosus (Thiele, 1905)
- Amphilectus strepsichelifer van Soest, Beglinger & De Voogd, 2012
- Amphilectus typichela (Lundbeck, 1905)
- Amphilectus unciger (Topsent, 1928)
- Amphilectus utriculus van Soest, Beglinger & De Voogd, 2012
