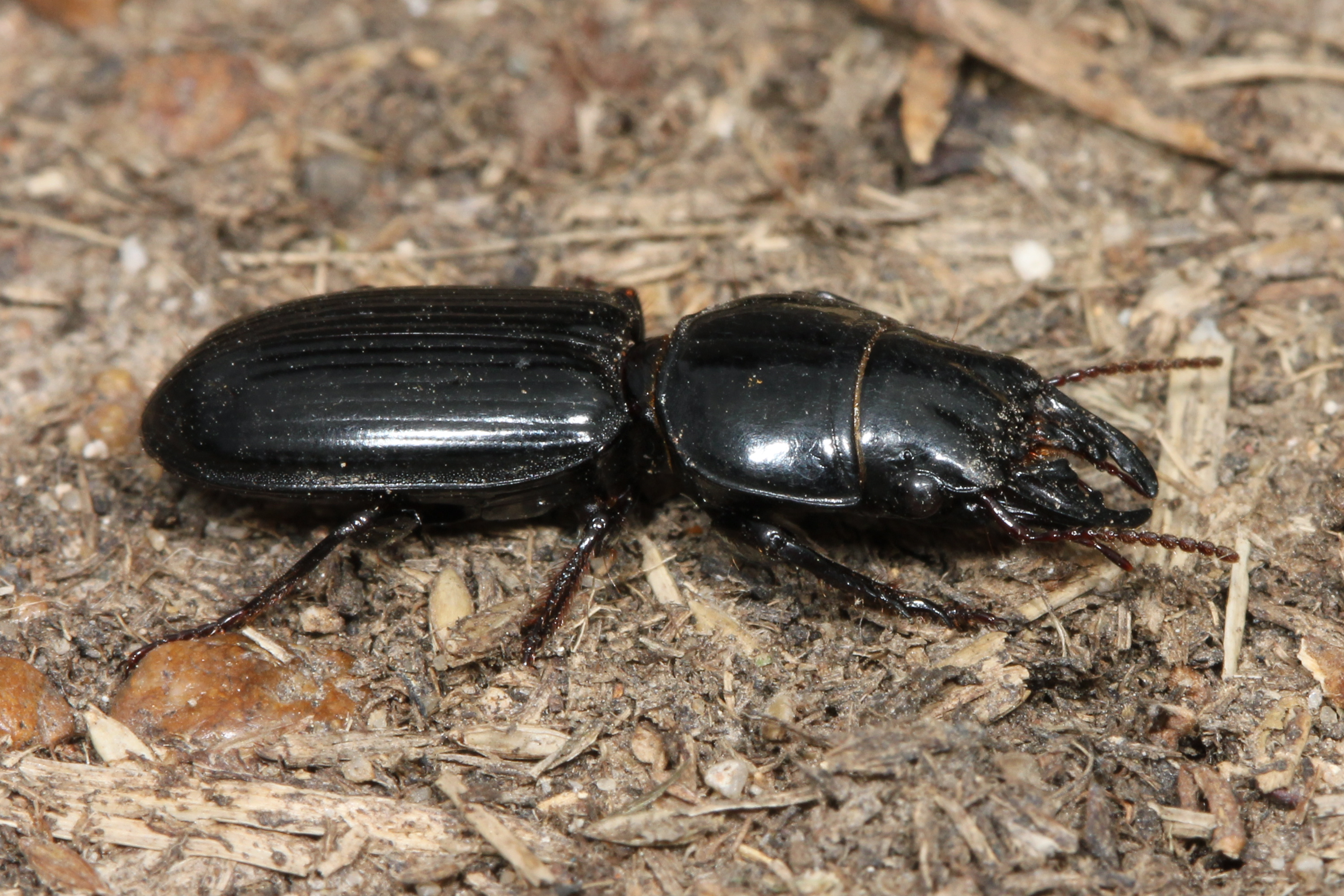

Scientific classification
- Domain: Eukaryota
- Kingdom: Animalia
- Phylum: Arthropoda
- Class: Insecta
- Order: Coleoptera
- Suborder: Adephaga
- Family: Carabidae
- Genus: Scarites
- Species: S. subterraneus

Binomial name
- Scarites subterraneus Fabricius, 1775

= Scarites subterraneus =

Species of beetle

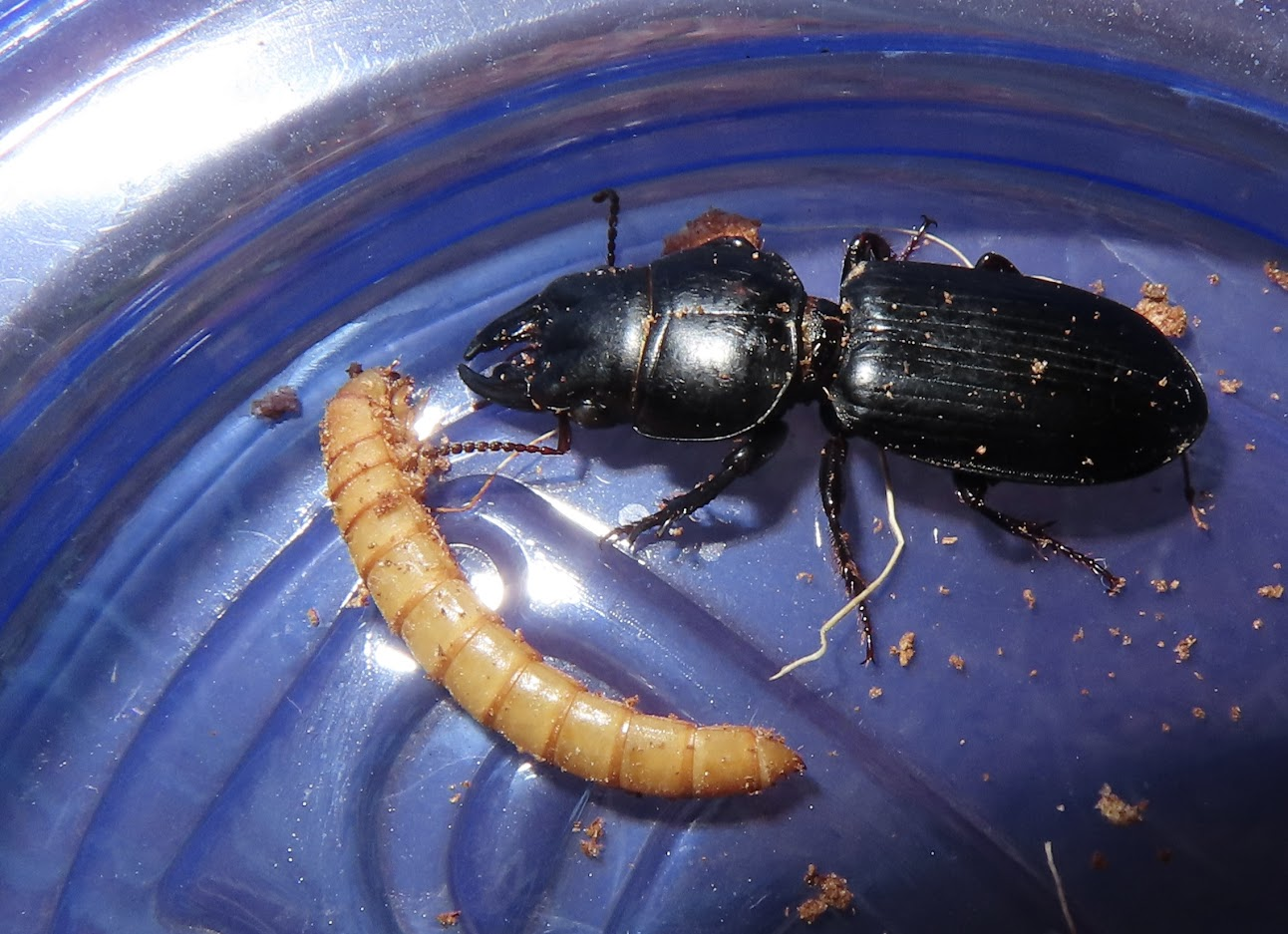
A Big-headed Ground Beetle with a mealworm, which it would later eat. They're willing to eat a variety of invertebrates.

Scarites subterraneus, known generally as the big-headed ground beetle or (tunneling large) pedunculate ground beetle, is a species of ground beetle in the family Carabidae. It is found throughout the Caribbean, Central America, and North America.

== Description ==
These beetles are generally between 15.0 and 30.0 mm. They have large mandibles, which have two teeth, for hunting and consuming their prey. The antenna of the creature are not clubbed or elbowed, rather, segmented. The elytra of S. subterraneus is fairly striated (streaked). Their front femora are adapted to dig. Wings present. Forebody loosely attached to the body. Antennomeres are 8–10 moniliform.

== Habitat ==
Scarites subterraneus, as its scientific name suggests, spends much of its time burrowing and hiding under logs, rocks, soil and leaf litter. They are found in a variety of habitats, such as forests and meadows. They are frequently encountered in residential areas, urban and rural alike. Their environment is generally defined as coastal.

== Diet ==
Scarites subterraneus is a carnivorous beetle. This is clear when looking at its large jaws, which it uses to hunt its prey. The specific diet of S. subterraneus is not remarkably clear (they seem to be willing to eat any invertebrate in any stage of life), but in captivity they have been observed to eat mealworms.

== Habits ==
Scarites subterraneus spends the day hiding under safe places (such as the aforementioned logs, rocks, and leaf litter) and comes out at night in search of prey. When startled, the beetles stiffen up, tuck in their limbs, and play dead. This habit is kept up until they feel safe to return to their "living" mode. Usually, this is when they are in a place they can easily escape from a predator in, or when the predator is out of sight. Adults are generally the most active during spring and summer. They are quite fond of light, and can be found at porch lights often.

== Predators ==
Predators of Scarites subterraneus are not very well studied, but American Robins, Eastern Bluebirds, Hermit Thrush, and Northern Cardinals have been observed consuming them.
