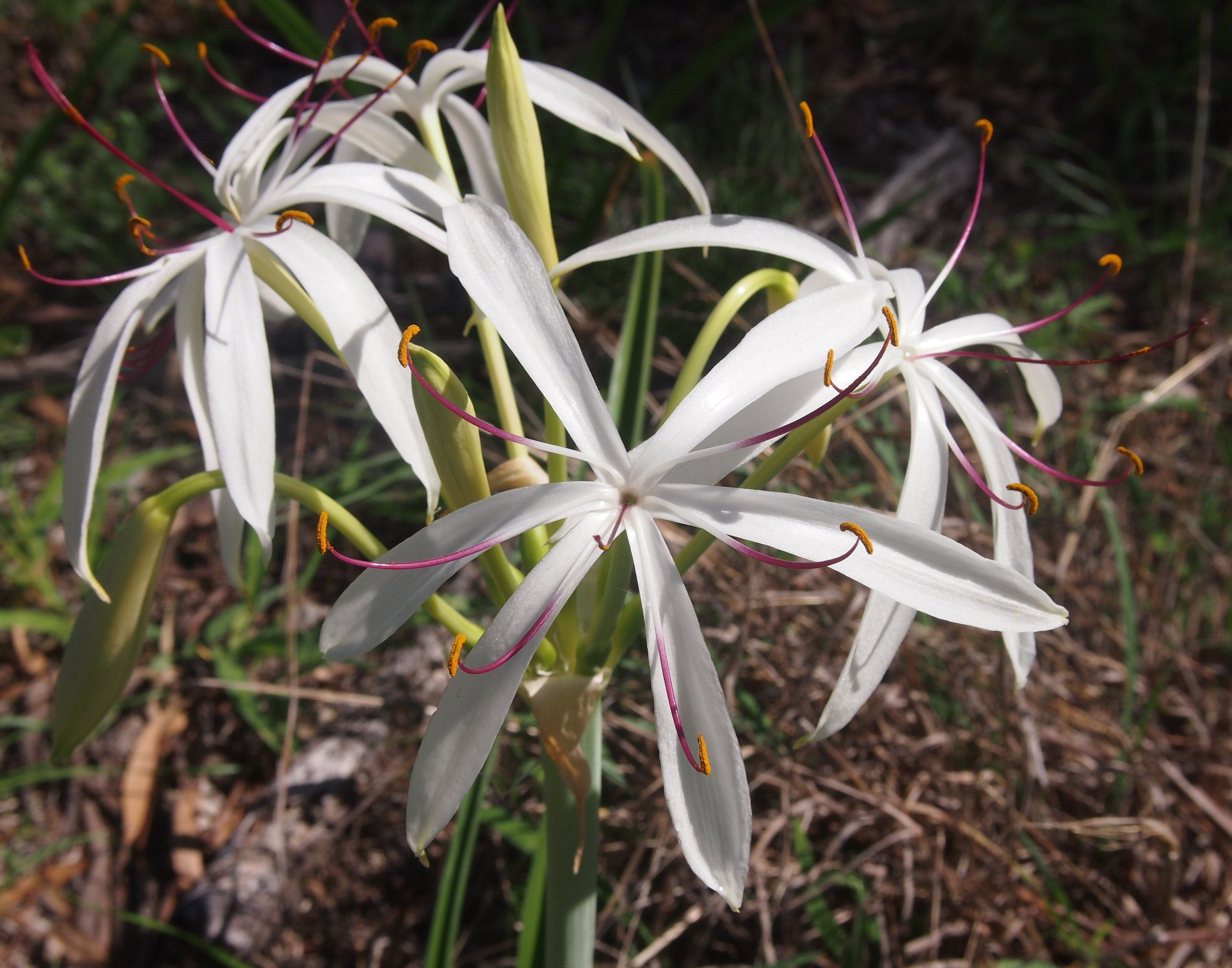

Scientific classification
- Kingdom: Plantae
- Clade: Tracheophytes
- Clade: Angiosperms
- Clade: Monocots
- Order: Asparagales
- Family: Amaryllidaceae
- Subfamily: Amaryllidoideae
- Genus: Crinum
- Species: C. angustifolium

Binomial name
- Crinum angustifolium R.Br.

= Crinum angustifolium =

Species of flowering plant

Crinum angustifolium, commonly known as the field lily, is a species of the family Amaryllidae native to northern Australia.
