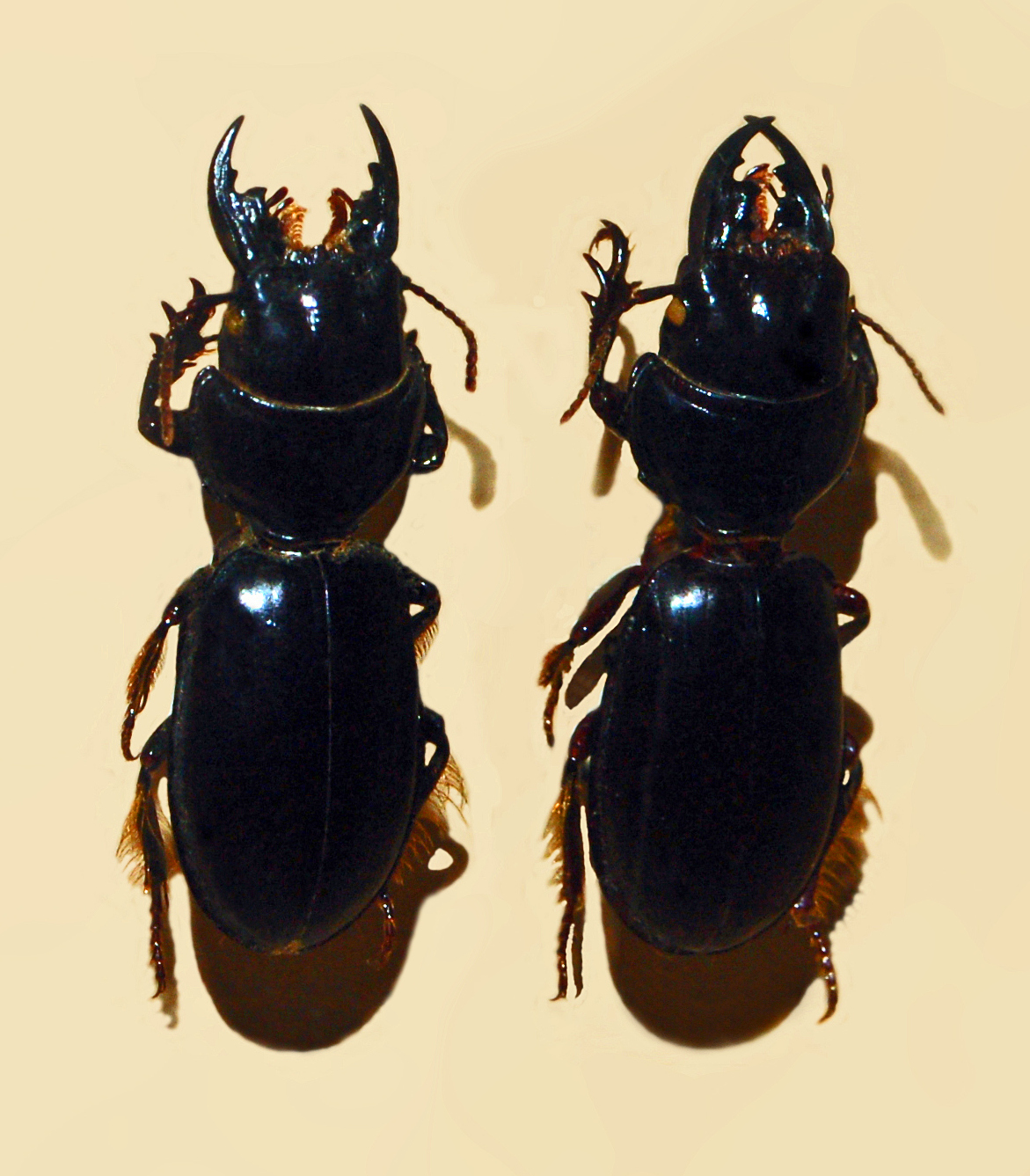
- Scarites buparius from Tunisia. Mounted specimen

Scientific classification
- Kingdom: Animalia
- Phylum: Arthropoda
- Clade: Pancrustacea
- Class: Insecta
- Order: Coleoptera
- Suborder: Adephaga
- Family: Carabidae
- Genus: Scarites
- Species: S. buparius

Binomial name
- Scarites buparius (J. R. Forster, 1771)

Synonyms
- Scarites gigas Fabricius, 1781; Scarites pyracmon ( Bonelli, 1813 )

= Scarites buparius =

Species of beetle

Scarites buparius is a species of beetle belonging to the family Carabidae.

== Distribution ==
This species occurs in France, Greece, Italy, Spain and in North Africa.

== Habitat ==
Scarites buparius lives in the coastal dunes and sandy beaches.

== Description ==
Scarites buparius reach a length of about 35–40 millimetres (1.4–1.6 in), with a maximum of 60 millimetres (2.4 in). The basic black color of this glossy beetle is aposematic, highlighting clearly the body on the sandy substrate.

Elytra present thin and shallow striae, almost absent in larger specimens. Sexual dimorphism is not conspicuous, but males are usually slightly smaller than females and the mandibles of the males are longer and hooked. This species is flightless.

== Biology ==
The males use their impressive mandibles to fight each other. This intra-male aggressive behaviour consist of a repeated series of fighting events, during which a dominance/submission status is established. The attack behaviour persistence is correlated with the body length During the fights the males grab the head of the antagonists and rise them into the air. These fights sometimes end with the death of one of the contenders.

Adults can be found in Spring and Summer, but present peaks of activity in May. They are used to spend the hottest hours of the day in their underground galleries, that they dig in the sand of the dunes with their strong front legs. Peak hunting activity begins usually in the evening. They present a large spectrum of preys, preferably other insects and gastropods, which they dismember with their powerful jaws. Prey is usually consumed inside their subterranean den.

== Gallery ==
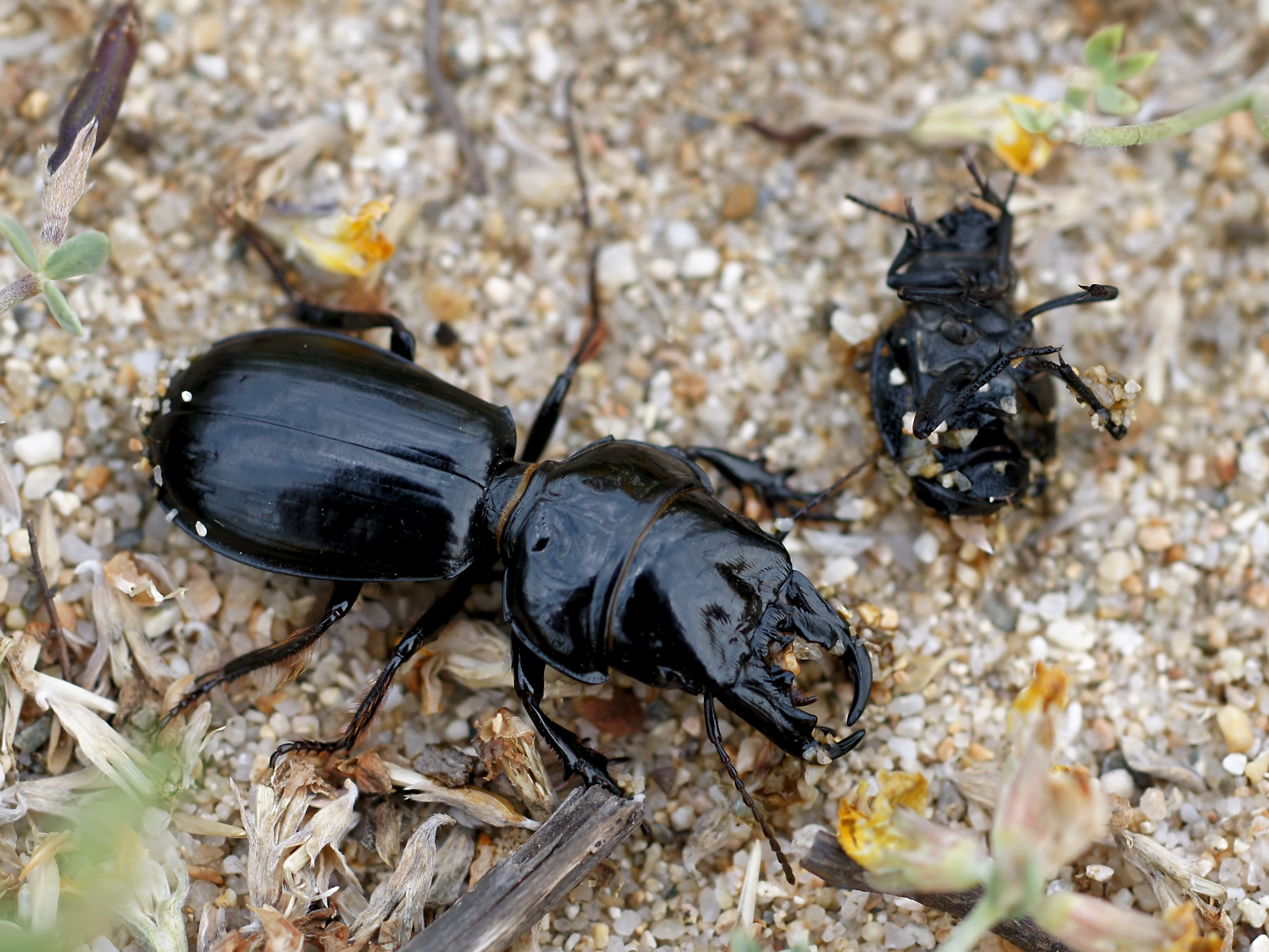
Scarites buparius with Pimelia bipunctata prey

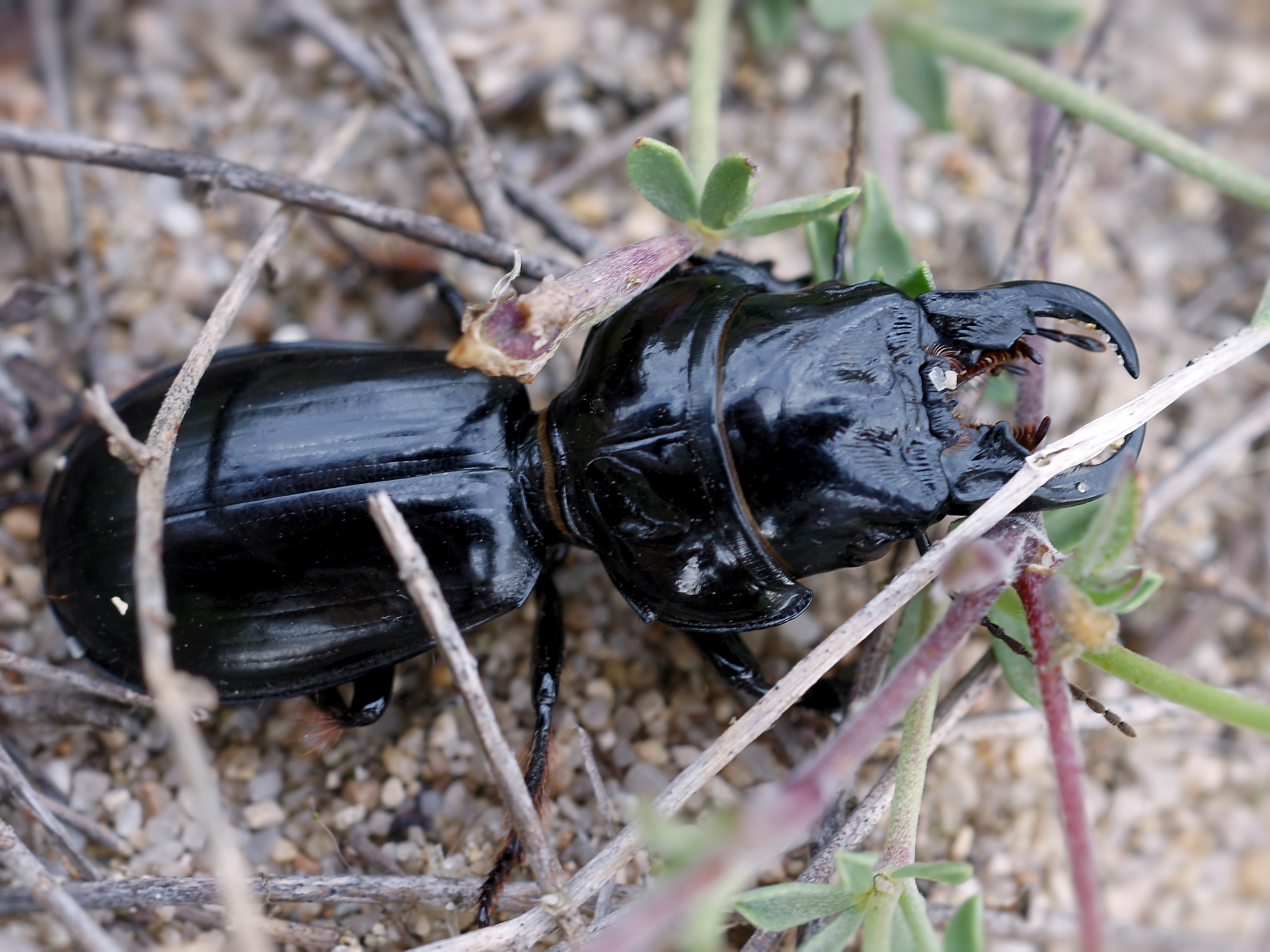
Scarites buparius. Close-up

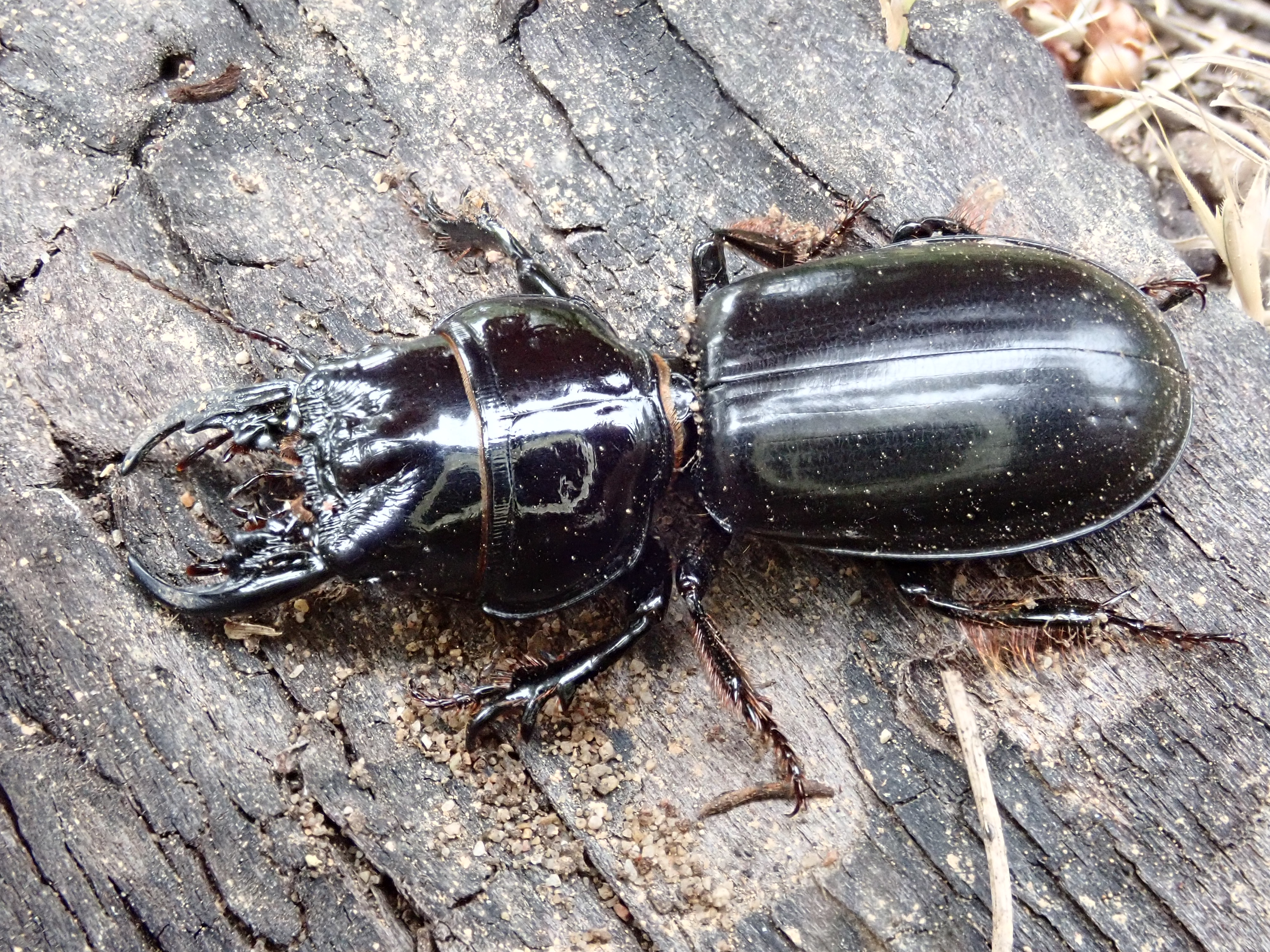
Scarites buparius, Kotychi, Greece
