= Ilhéu de Cima =

Island of Cape Verde

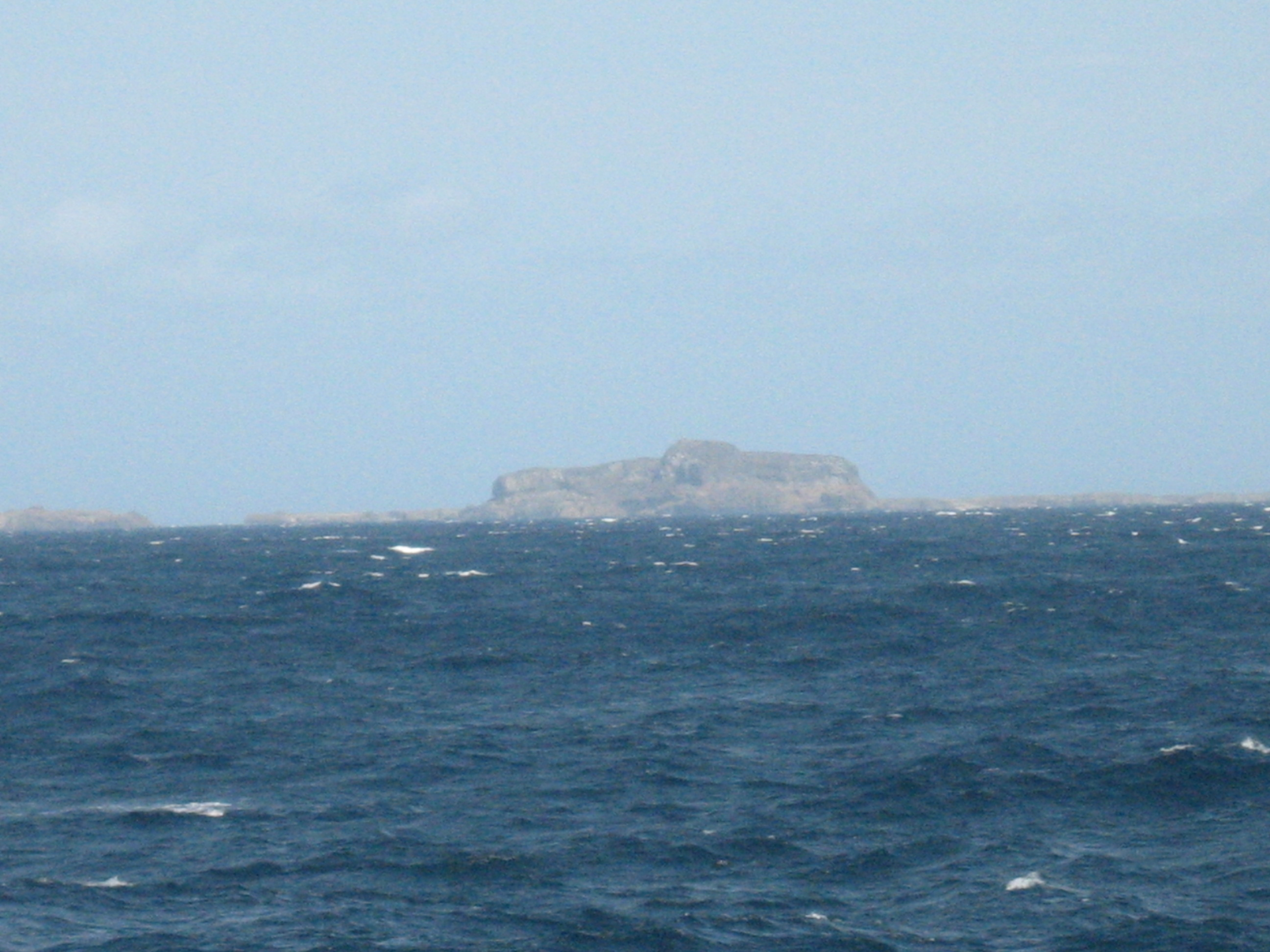
- Ilhéu de Cima

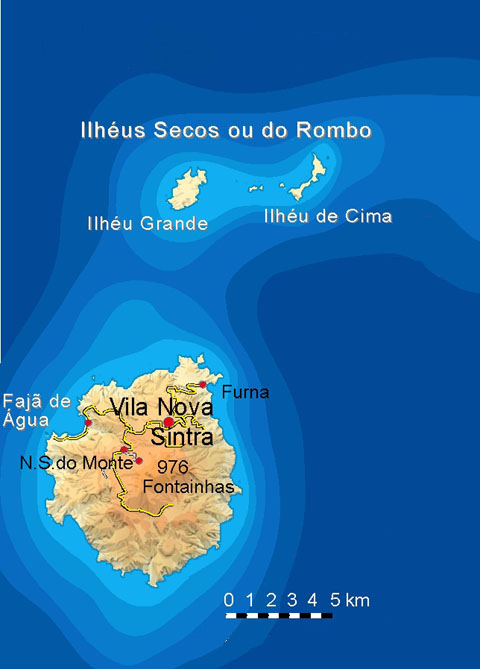

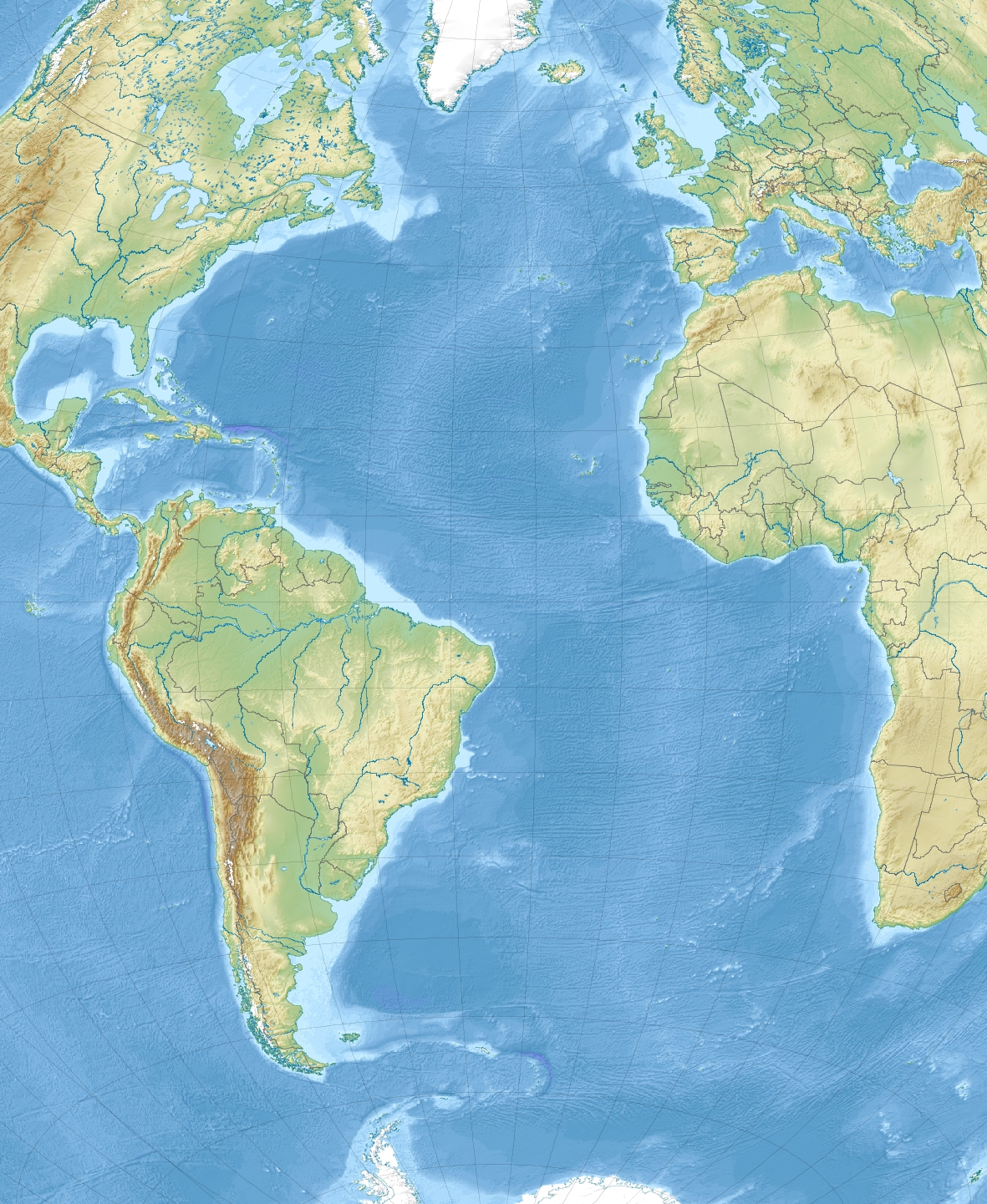
- Location within Cape Verde Location within Atlantic Ocean

Geography
- Location: Atlantic Ocean
- Coordinates: 14.971°N 24.638°W
- Total islands: 3
- Area: 1.5 km^{2} (0.58 sq mi)
- Length: 2.2 km (1.37 mi)
- Width: 0.94 km (0.584 mi)
- Highest elevation: 77 m (253 ft)

Administration
- Cape Verde
- Concelhos (Municipalities): Brava

Demographics
- Population: 0

Ilhéu de Cima is an uninhabited island of Cape Verde. It is part of the Ilhéus do Rombo islet group, located 4 kilometres (2.5 mi) east of Ilhéu Grande, the other main islet of the group, and 8 kilometres (5.0 mi) northeast of the island Brava. They are administratively a part of the Brava municipality. Surrounding islets include Ilhéu Luiz Carneiro, Ilhéu Sapado, and Ilhéu do Rei. The island is part of the integral nature reserve Ilhéus do Rombo, famous for its seabird colonies.

The southern part of the islet is the highest, culminating at 77 metres (253 ft). This is where the Ilhéu de Cima Lighthouse is situated, the only building on the island. The islet was mentioned as "Ghuay" in the 1747 map by Jacques-Nicolas Bellin.

Notable endemic fauna found on the island include the Iago sparrow. In the mid-1950s, W. R. P. Bourne observed females remaining in flocks while males began to take up locations on rocky slopes from which they could sing. A species of sponge Esperiopsis cimensis was found in the deep waters surrounding the islet.

== See also ==
- List of islands of Cape Verde
