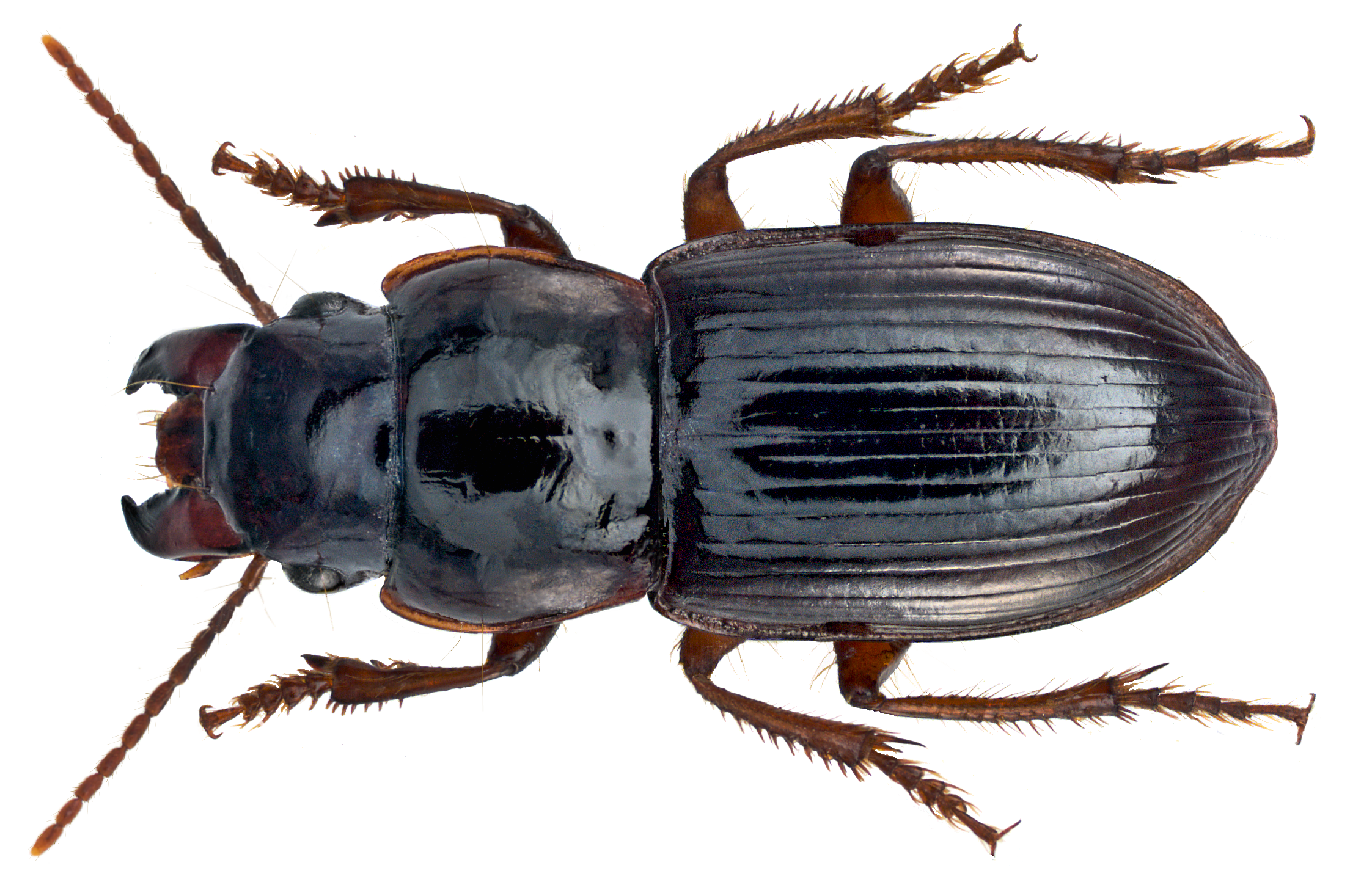
- Nesarpalus fortunatus

Scientific classification
- Domain: Eukaryota
- Kingdom: Animalia
- Phylum: Arthropoda
- Class: Insecta
- Order: Coleoptera
- Suborder: Adephaga
- Family: Carabidae
- Subfamily: Harpalinae
- Tribe: Harpalini
- Subtribe: Harpalina
- Genus: Nesarpalus; Bedel, 1897

= Nesarpalus =

Genus of beetles

Nesarpalus is a genus in the beetle family Carabidae. There are at least two described species in Nesarpalus.

== Species ==
These two species belong to the genus Nesarpalus:

- Nesarpalus cimensis (Cockerell, 1922) (Madeira)
- Nesarpalus gregarius (Fauvel, 1897) (Madeira)
