= Ilhéus do Rombo =

Island group in Cape Verde chain

Coordinates: 14°50′N 24°50′W

Nickname: Ilhéus Secos
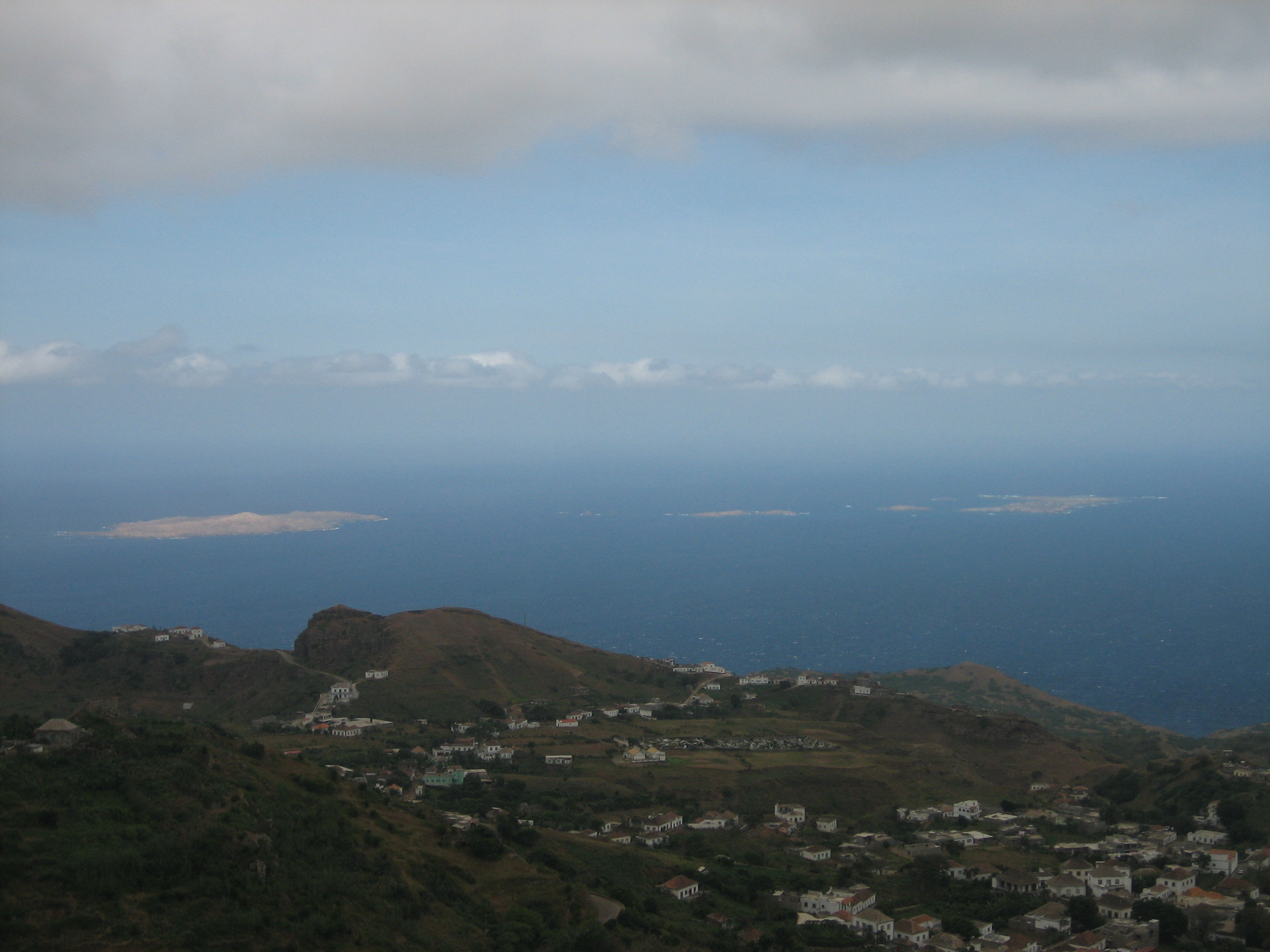
- View of Ilhéus do Rombo from the middle of Brava in Nova Sintra, Ilhéu Grande is on the left

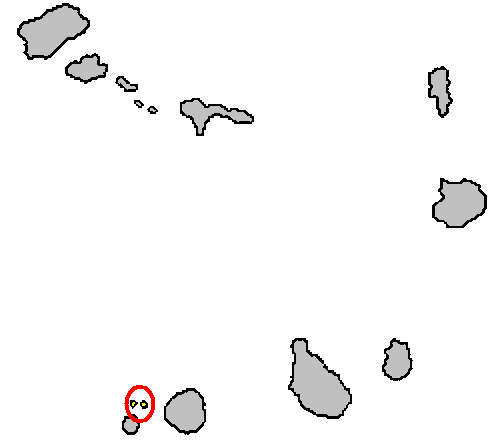
- Map of the Cape Verde archipelago, showing the position of the Ilhéus do Rombo

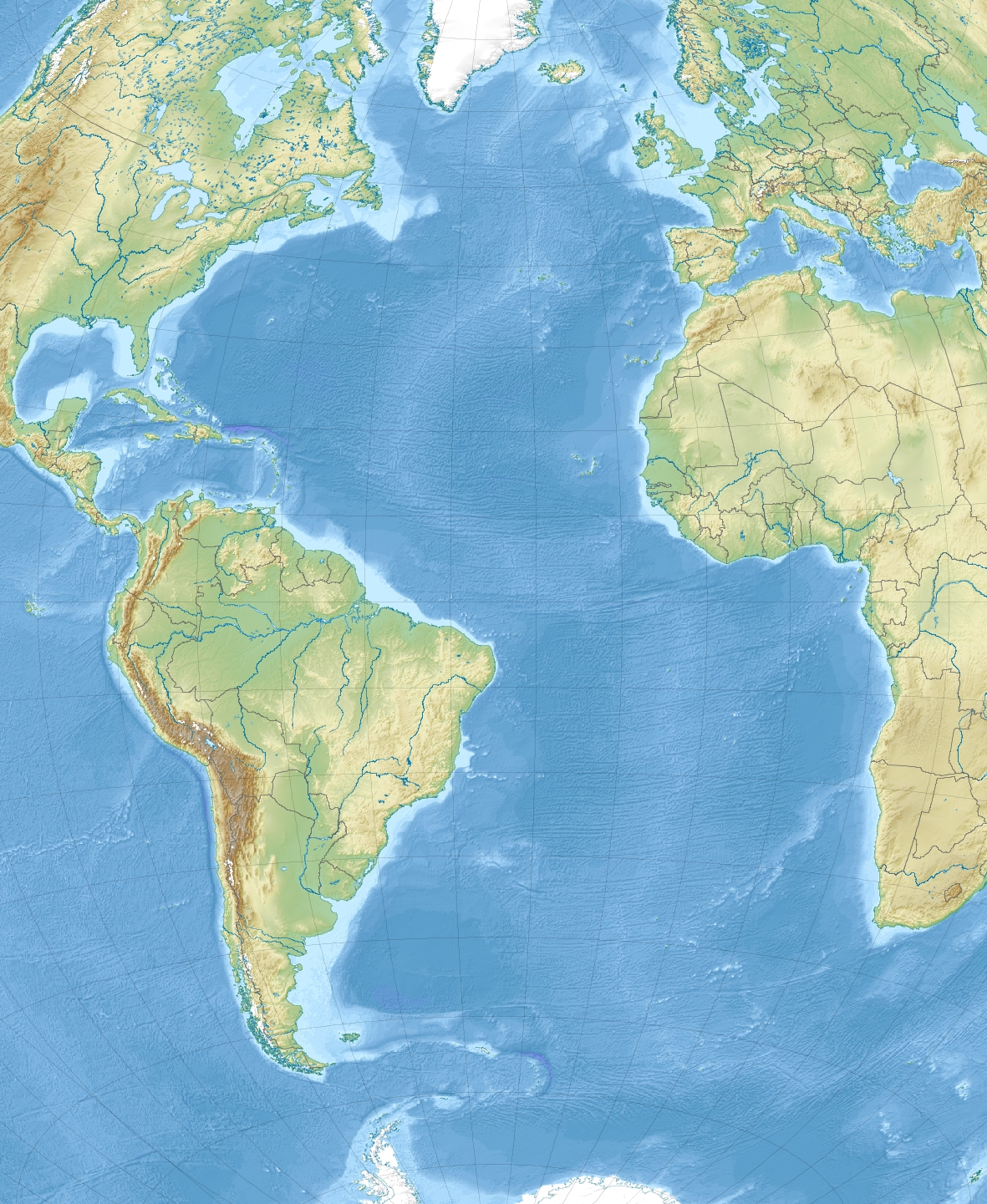
- Location in Cape Verde Location in Atlantic Oceon

Geography
- Location: Atlantic Ocean
- Total islands: >5
- Major islands: 2
- Highest elevation: 97 m (318 ft)

Administration
- Cape Verde
- Concelhos (Municipalities): Brava

Demographics
- Population: 0

The Ilhéus do Rombo, also known as the Ilhéus Secos (Portuguese for "Dry Islets", because of their aridity and paucity of vegetation), are a group of small, uninhabited islands in the Cape Verde archipelago, lying 600 km (370 mi) off the coast of north-west Africa in the Atlantic Ocean. The islets form an integral nature reserve. They are sited on a volcanic seamount 7 km (4.3 mi) north of Brava and 15 km (9.3 mi) west of Fogo. The two major islets of the chain are Ilhéu Grande (300 ha (740 acres)) and Ilhéu de Cima (150 ha (370 acres)). Administratively they are part of the municipality of Brava. They can be seen from Brava and, sometimes, from Fogo.

== Description ==
The larger islets have some sparse grassland. Ilhéu Grande is on the west side of the group. It has a length of about 1.5 km (0.93 mi) from south-west to north-east and a width of 600–800 m (2,000–2,600 ft), with a small bay in the north-west. Ilhéu de Cima, on the east of the group, is about 1 km (0.62 mi) long and 500–600 km (310–370 mi); wide, with a small bay in its south-east. Some smaller unvegetated islets and rocks, including the Ilhéu do Rei, Ilhéu Sapado and Ilhéu Luiz Carneiro, lie between them.

=== Fauna ===
Ilhéu de Cima is famous for its seabird colonies. Ilhéu Grande, which has been used by goat farmers and whalers in the past, does not currently support breeding seabirds, though large colonies must have existed formerly as the island has thick layers of guano. The island group has been identified as an Important Bird Area (IBA) by BirdLife International because it supports seabird colonies as well as peregrine falcons and Iago sparrows. Birds include the Frigate bird (Pelagodroma marina) numbering around 1,000 in 1989, the Boyd's shearwater (Puffinus boydi), Oceanodroma castro, Bulwer's petrel (Bulweria bulwerii), the brown booby (Sula leucogaster) (50 pairs between 1986 and 1990) and Phaethon aethereus (only 5-10 couples between 1986 and 1990). Also there is a subspecies of the Peregrine falcon named madens, discovered in the mid-1960s with only 15 to 20 pairs.

Sea turtles have been reported to nest occasionally on the small, sandy beaches of Ilhéu de Cima. Other marine fauna also dominates underwater surrounding the islets. Other fauna includes the gecko species Tarentola protogigas.

== See also ==
- List of islands of Cape Verde
