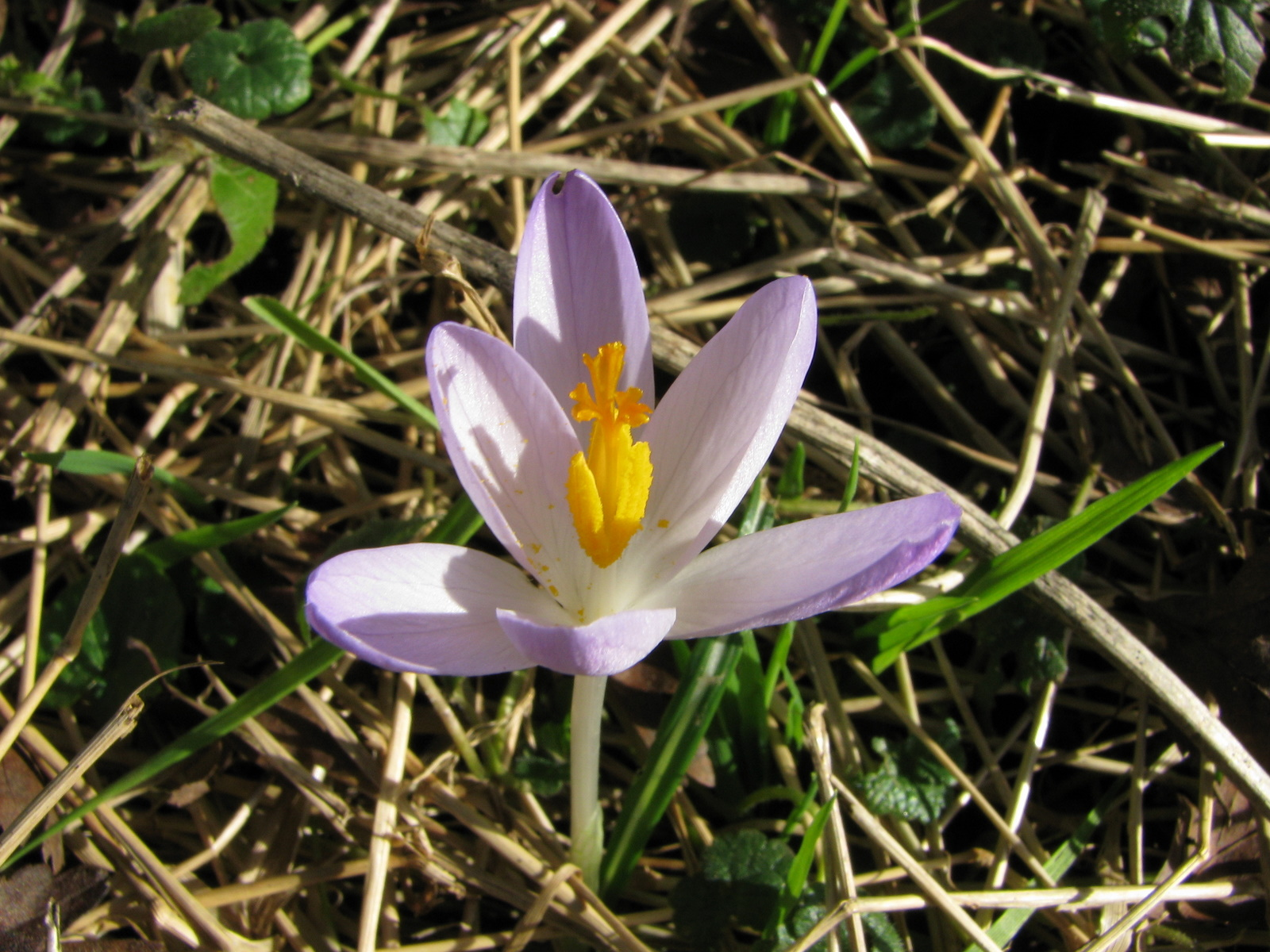

Scientific classification
- Kingdom: Plantae
- Clade: Embryophytes
- Clade: Tracheophytes
- Clade: Angiosperms
- Clade: Monocots
- Order: Asparagales
- Family: Iridaceae
- Genus: Crocus
- Species: C. tommasinianus

Binomial name
- Crocus tommasinianus Herb.

Synonyms
- Crocus vernus var. tommasinianus (Herb.) Nyman; Crocus serbicus A.Kern. ex Maw; Crocus tommasinianus f. jeremicii Randjel.

= Crocus tommasinianus =

Species of flowering plant

Crocus tommasinianus, the woodland crocus, early crocus, or Tommasini's crocus, is a species of flowering plant in the family Iridaceae. It is named after the botanist Muzio G. Spirito de Tommasini (1794–1879). It is native to Bulgaria, Hungary, Albania, and the former Yugoslavia. It is often referred to as the early or snow crocus, but these terms are shared with several other species, although C. tommasinianus is amongst the first to bloom. Multiple plants are often called tommies in the horticultural trade.

== Description ==
It is a cormous perennial of the genus Crocus in the family Iridaceae with a lilac flower, and is one of the smaller of the cultivated species. It has slender flowers about 2–4 cm (1–2 in) long, with white perianth tubes, petals (6) pale silvery lilac to reddish purple, while the outer petals may be overlaid with silver and darker tips. A variant, C. tommasinianus f. albus, is white. Its cultivars are used as ornamental plants. Height: 3 in (76 mm)

== Habitat ==
The species is found growing around 1000 meters in woods and on shady hillsides, commonly on limestone with flowering occurring in January and February; the narrow leaves are fully developed by the time the purple flowers with white tubes blooms.

== Cultivation ==
It naturalizes easily earning an official recognition as a weed and is naturalized in the US state of Delaware. It is often planted in large drifts in gardens and parks.

This plant has gained the Royal Horticultural Society's Award of Garden Merit.

== Cultivars ==
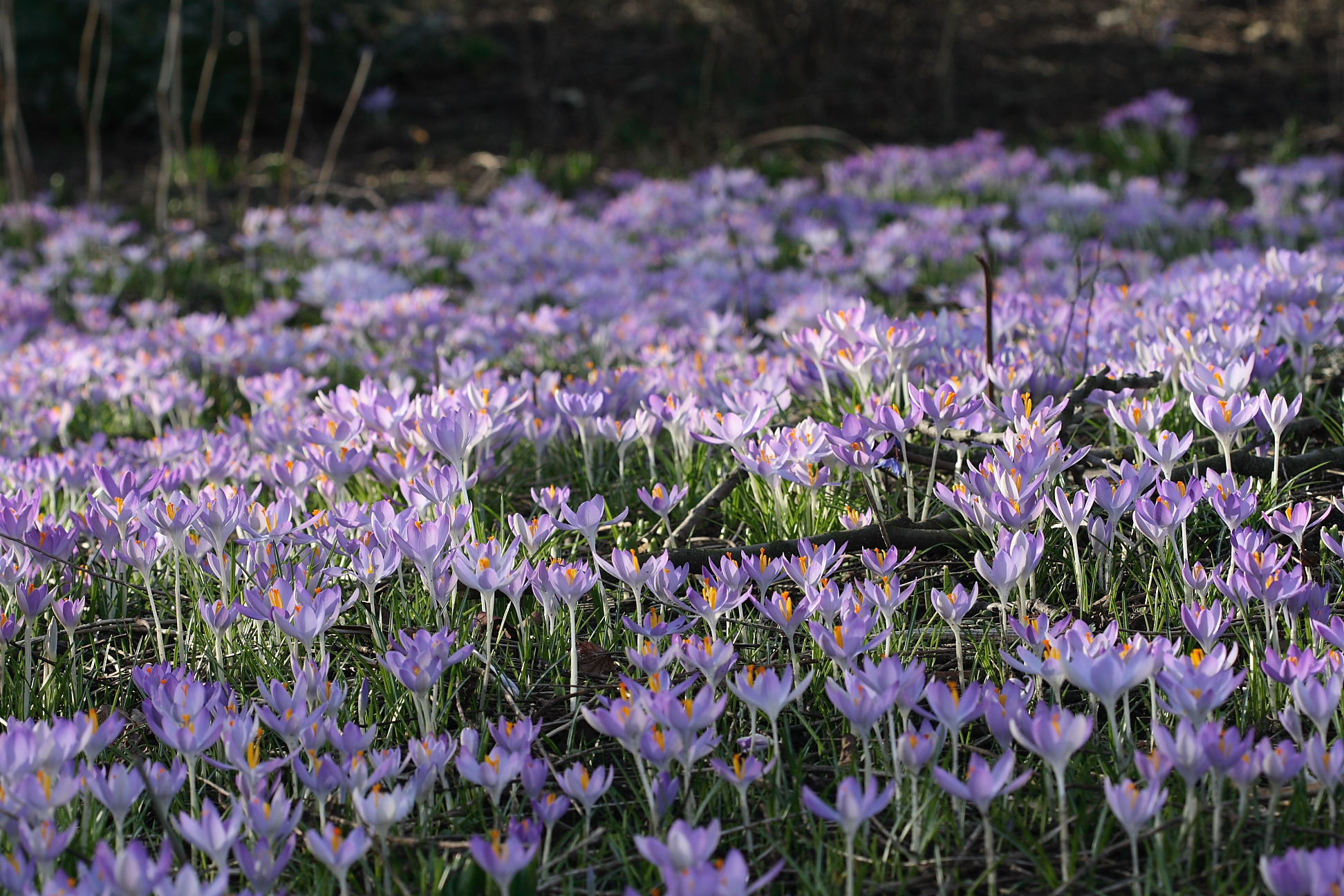
Colony of "tommies" (Elfenkrokus) in Planten und Blumen, Hamburg

Examples:

- 'Barr's Purple' (amethyst violet)
- 'Lilac Beauty' (purple)
- 'Roseus' (Pink Snow)
- 'Ruby Giant' (purple)
- 'Whitewell Purple' (silvery reddish purple flowers, pale mauve on the inside)
