= Esperiopsidae =

Scientific classification
- Kingdom: Animalia
- Phylum: Porifera
- Class: Demospongiae
- Order: Poecilosclerida
- Family: Esperiopsidae; Hentschel, 1923

Genera
- See text

Family of sponges

Esperiopsidae is a family of marine demosponges.

== Genera ==
The World Register of Marine Species includes four genera:

- Amphilectus Vosmaer, 1880
- Esperiopsis Carter, 1882
- Semisuberites Carter, 1877
- Ulosa Laubenfels, 1936
