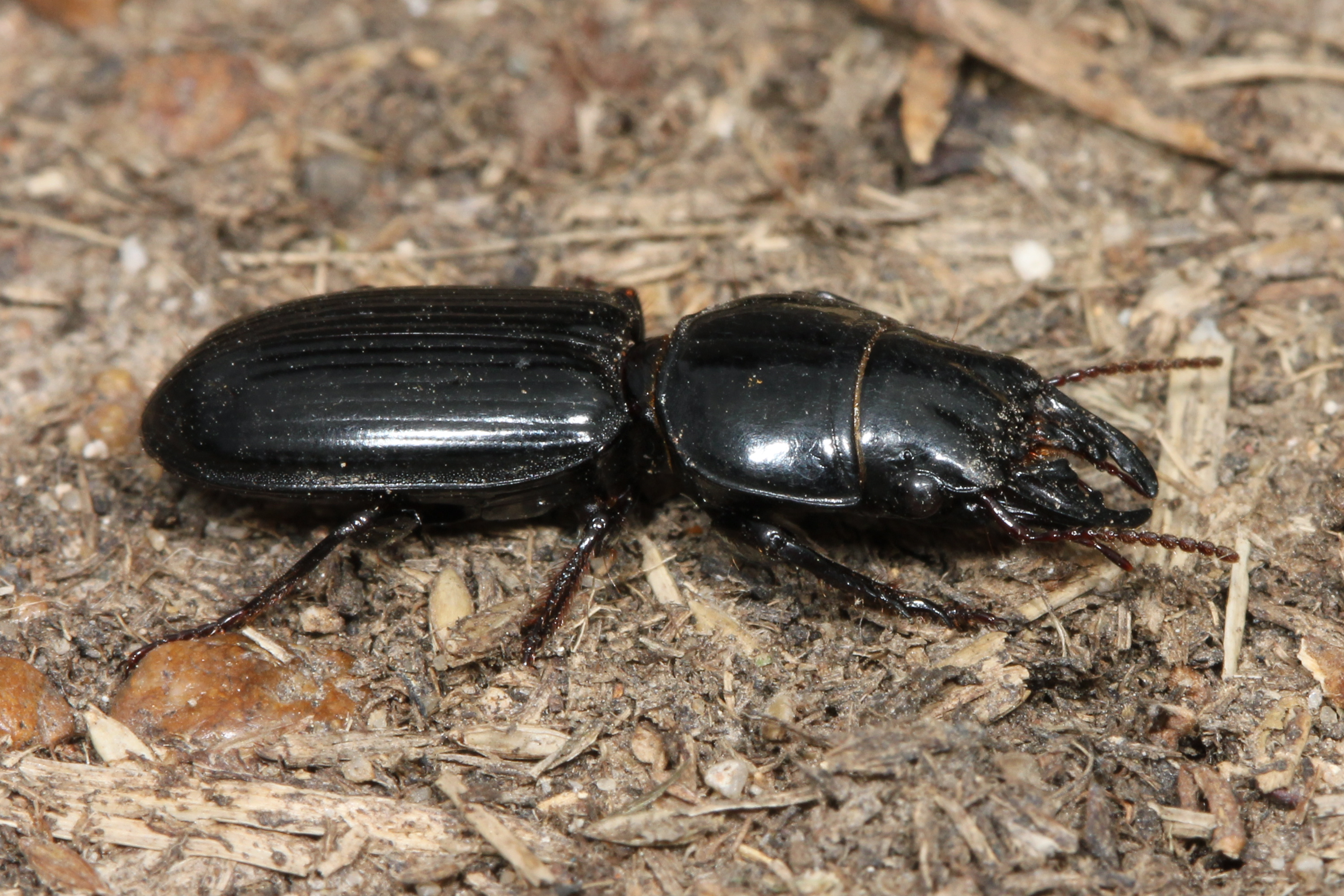
- Big-headed ground beetle (Scarites subterraneus)

Scientific classification
- Domain: Eukaryota
- Kingdom: Animalia
- Phylum: Arthropoda
- Class: Insecta
- Order: Coleoptera
- Suborder: Adephaga
- Family: Carabidae
- Tribe: Scaritini
- Genus: Scarites; Fabricius, 1775

= Scarites =

Genus of beetles

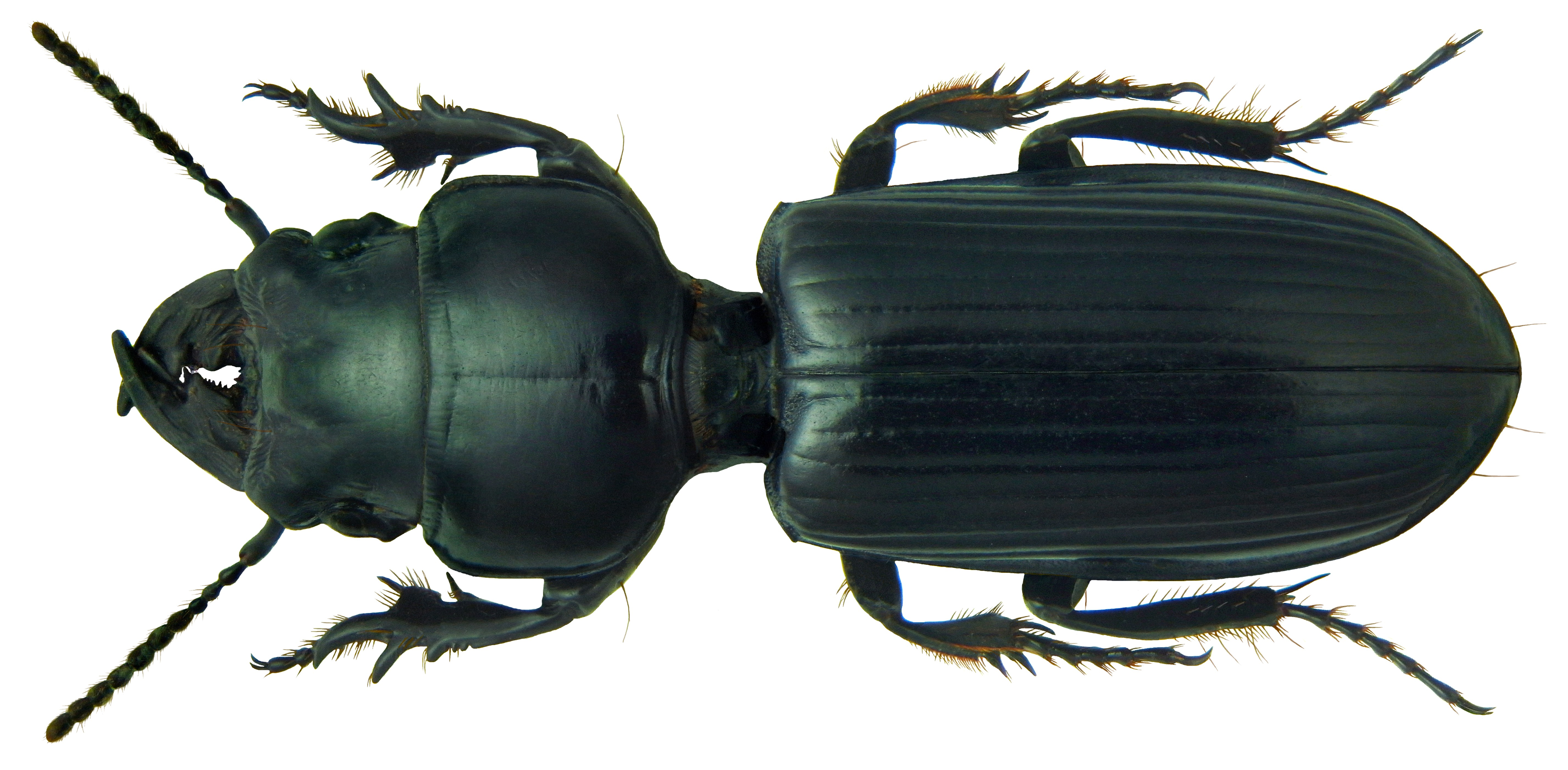
Scarites linearis

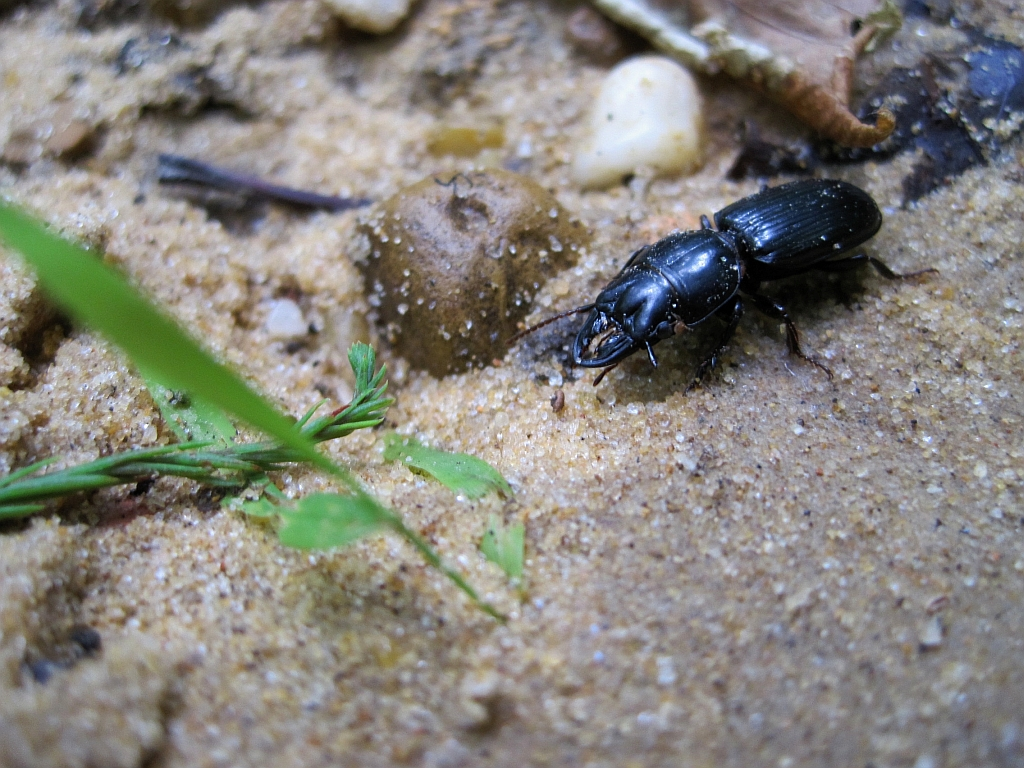
Scarites subterraneus

Scarites is a genus of ground beetle native to the Palearctic, the Near East, North America and North Africa, India . There are more than 190 described species in Scarites with more than 55 described species from India.

These beetles share physical characteristics of the more tropical stag beetles, but are not closely related. Scarites can often be found under loose rocks and boards, often in moist or sandy soil. If touched, they often "play dead" by folding in their legs and arching their backs. The adult beetles are predators and have been observed overpowering mealworms much larger than themselves.

== See also ==
- List of Scarites species
