= Cova Joana =

- Settlement
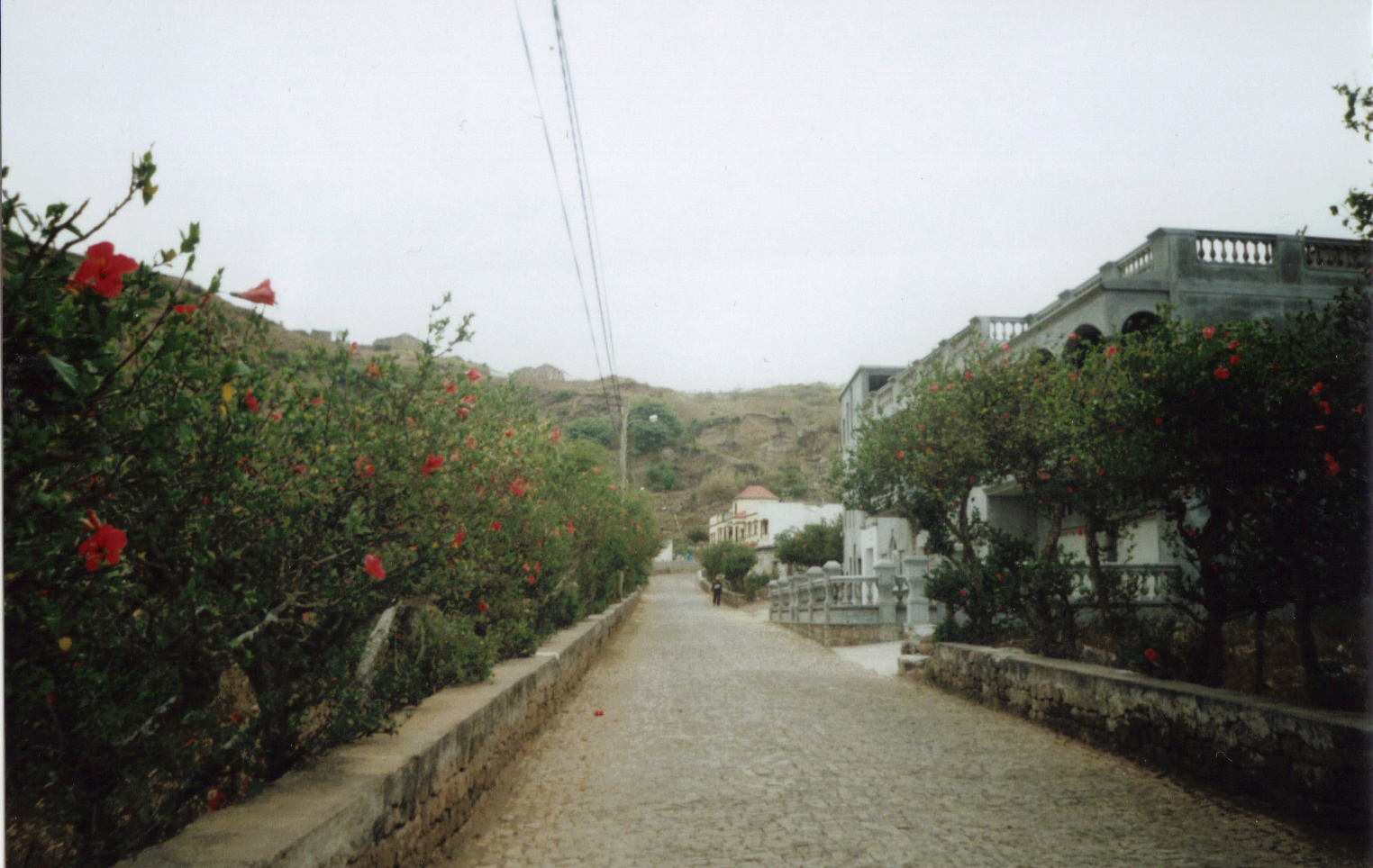
- Cova Joana, Main Street

- Location within Cape Verde
- Coordinates: 14.863°N 24.713°W
- Country: Cape Verde
- Island: Brava
- Municipality: Brava
- Civil parish: Nossa Senhora do Monte
- Elevation: 645 m (2,116 ft)

Population (2010)
  - Total: 183
- ID: 91203

Cova Joana is a village in the central part of the island of Brava, Cape Verde. It is situated in a mountain valley, 0.5 km north of Nossa Senhora do Monte and 2 km southwest of the island capital Nova Sintra. In 2010 its population was 183. Its elevation is 645 meters.

== Description ==
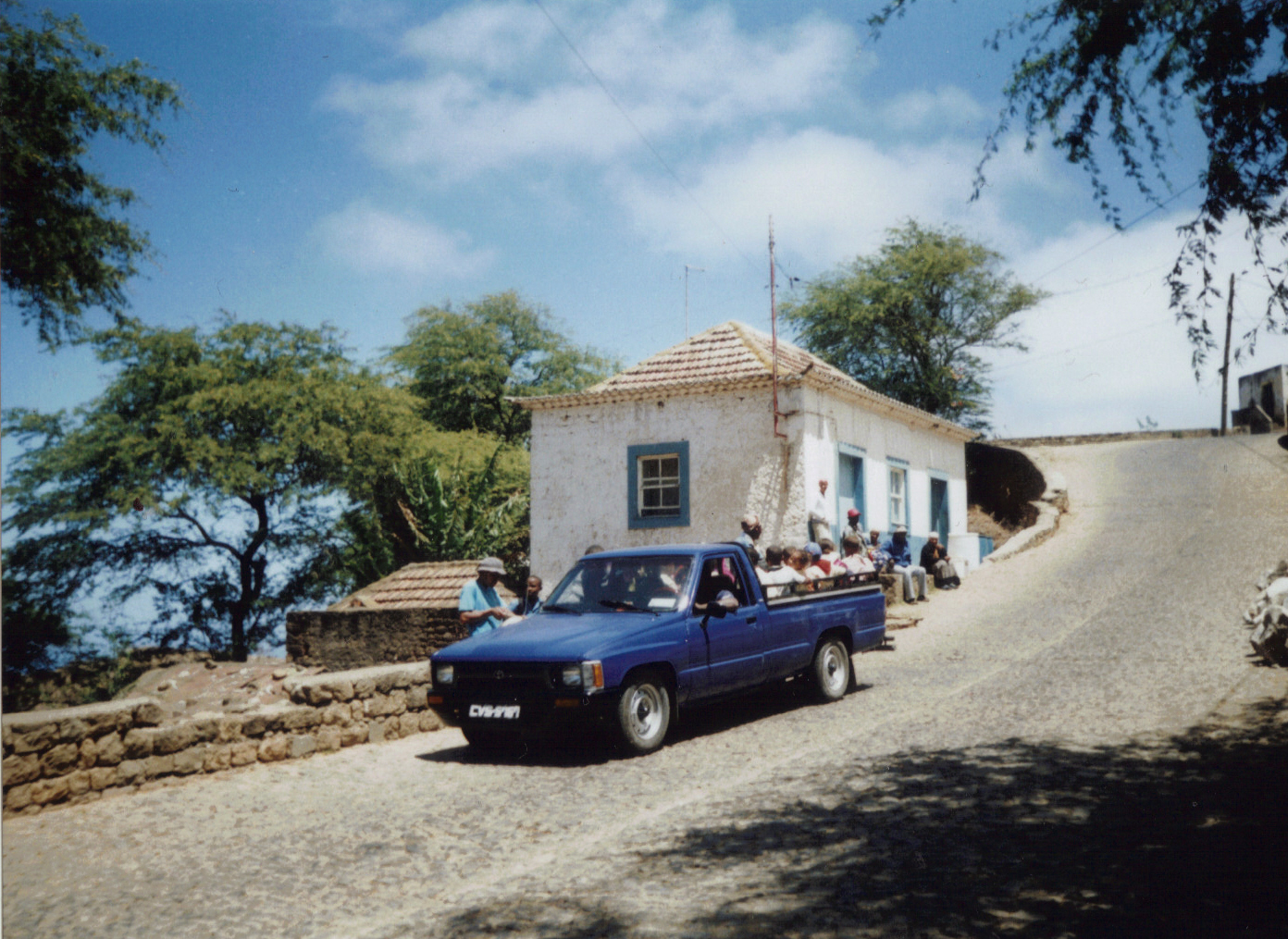
Aluguer bus on Brava.

The name of the village Cova Joana refers to the location, as the creole word cova means crater, depression or valley. The village is linked by a good paved road to Nova Sintra, the capital of Brava which is about seven kilometers away by road, and to Nossa Senhora do Monte, a pilgrimage place which is about one kilometer to the South. The small harbour Fajã de Água on the West coast can be reached on a beautiful walking track as well as the Monte Fontainhas, the highest mountain of Brava reaching a height of 976 meters.

Brava is known as the greenest island of Cape Verde. Frequently Brava is covered by clouds, so that evaporation is comparatively low and the island can keep its humidity. Humidity is kept even longer in the depression of Cova Joana, where agriculture (especially maize, bananas and beans) is the main source of income. Many houses have a garden where vegetables are grown.
