= Vinagre, Cape Verde =

Vinagre
- Settlement
- Coordinates: 14.869°N 24.679°W
- Country: Cape Verde
- Island: Brava
- Municipality: Brava
- Civil parish: São João Baptista

Population (2010)
  - Total: 8
- ID: 91109

Vinagre is a village in the eastern part of the island of Brava, Cape Verde. It is situated at 200 m elevation, close to the Atlantic coast. It is about 3 kilometer east of the island capital of Nova Sintra, northwest is the small village of Santa Bárbara

There is a mineral spring in the village called nascente do Vinagre, which supplies the village Furna with drinking water.
