= Cova Rodela =

- Settlement
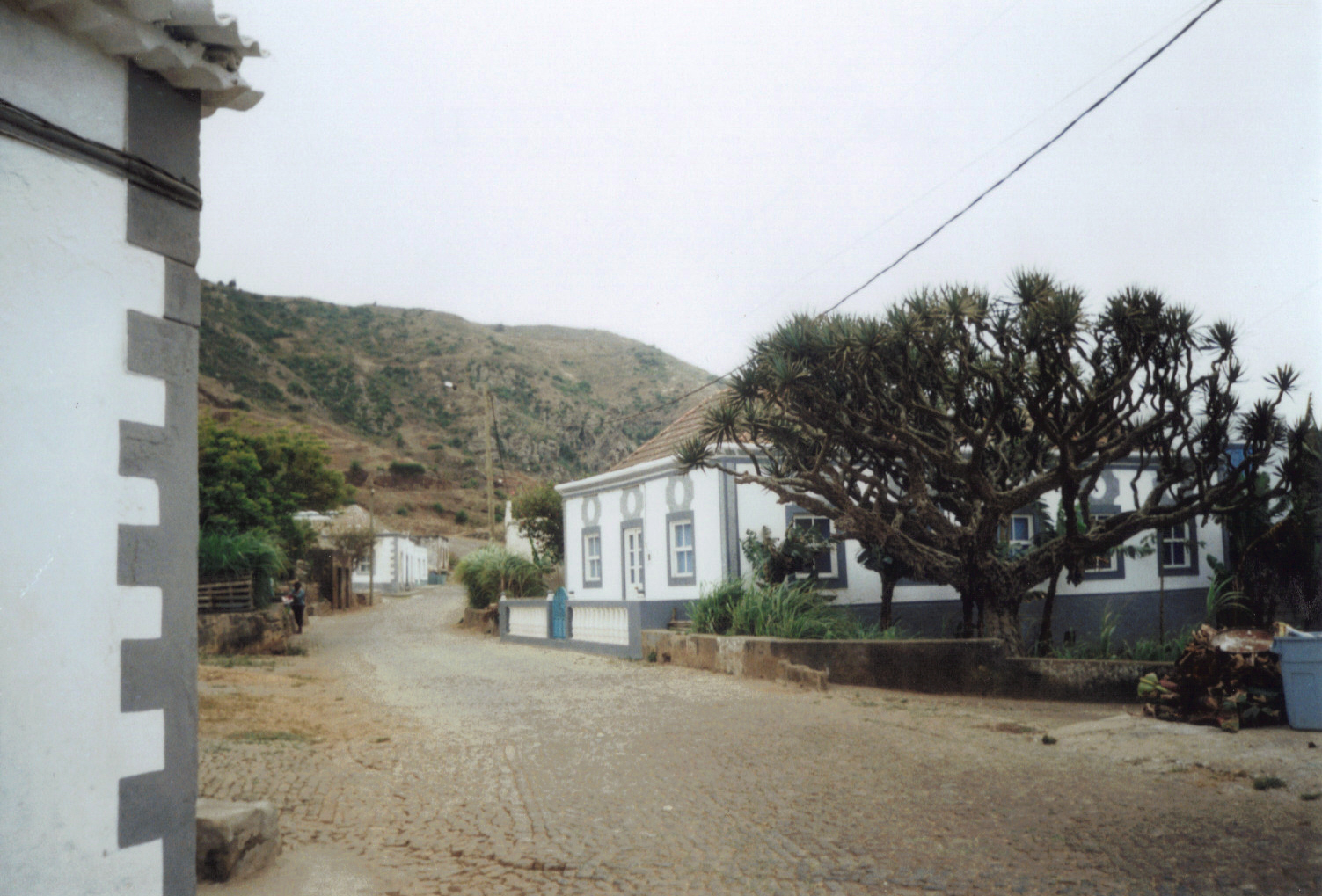
- Dragon Tree in Main Street.

- Location within Cape Verde
- Coordinates: 14.872°N 24.705°W
- Country: Cape Verde
- Island: Brava
- Municipality: Brava
- Civil parish: São João Baptista

Population (2010)
  - Total: 481
- ID: 91101

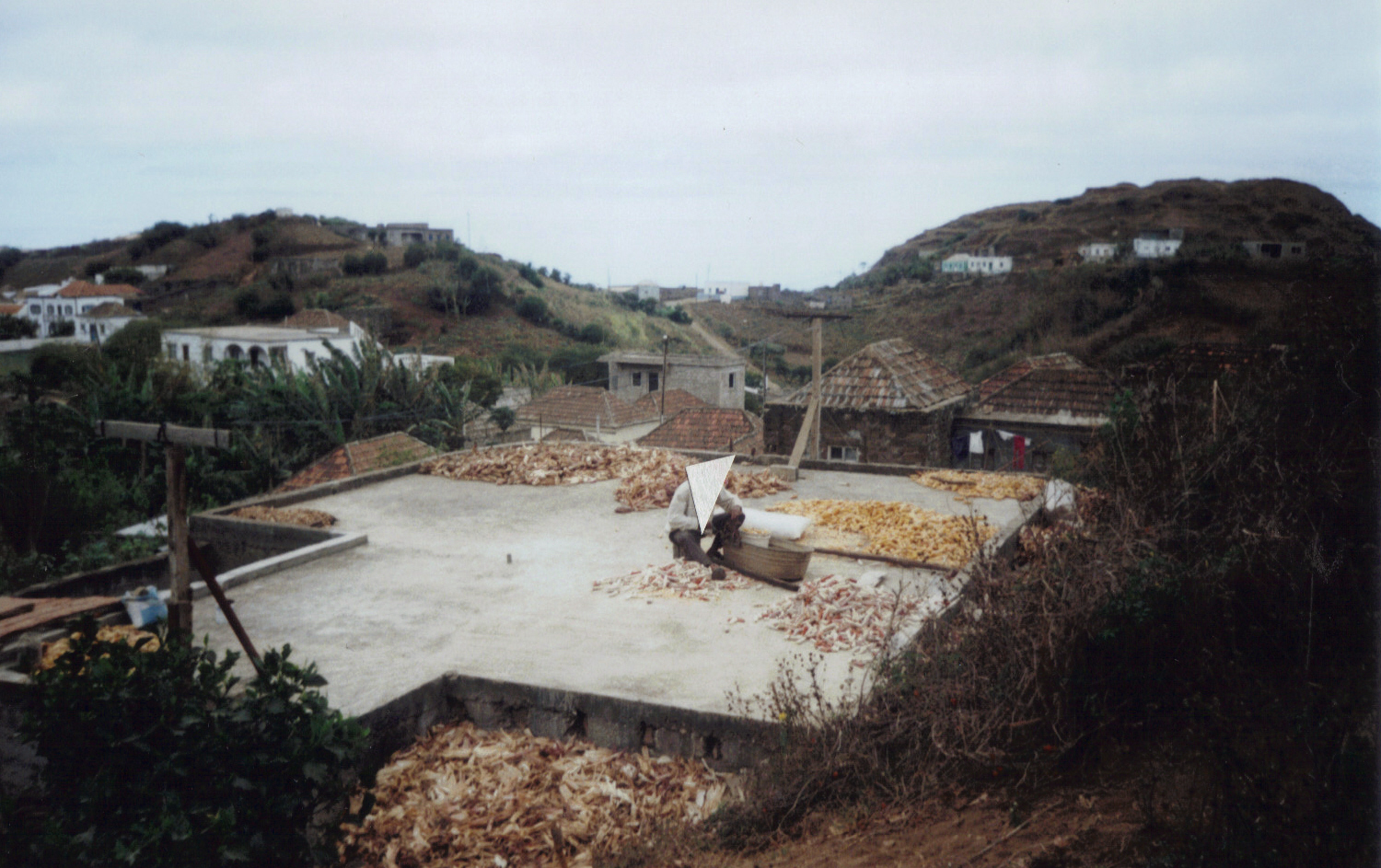
Harvesting maize in Cova Rodela.

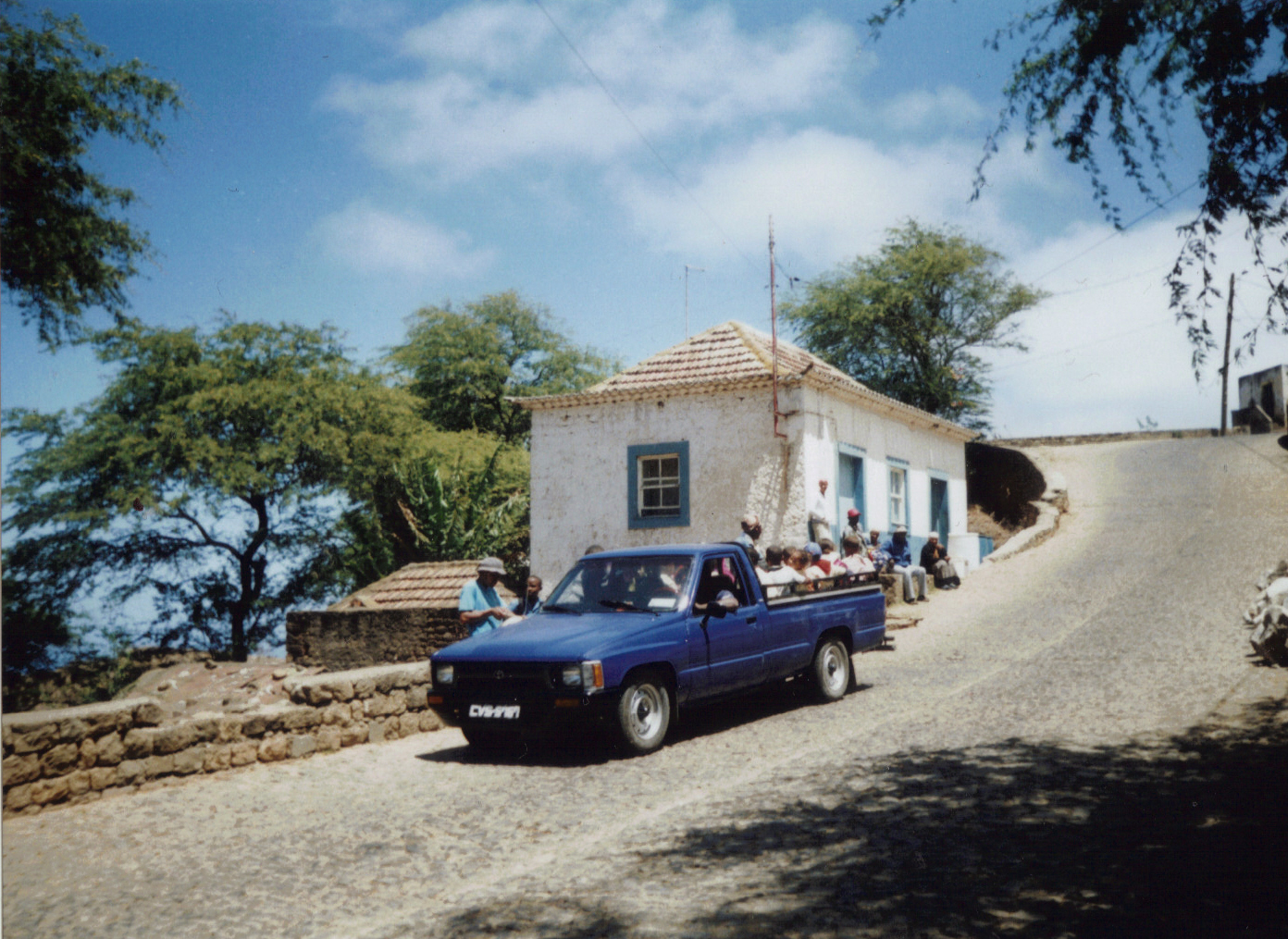
"Aluguer" bus on Brava.

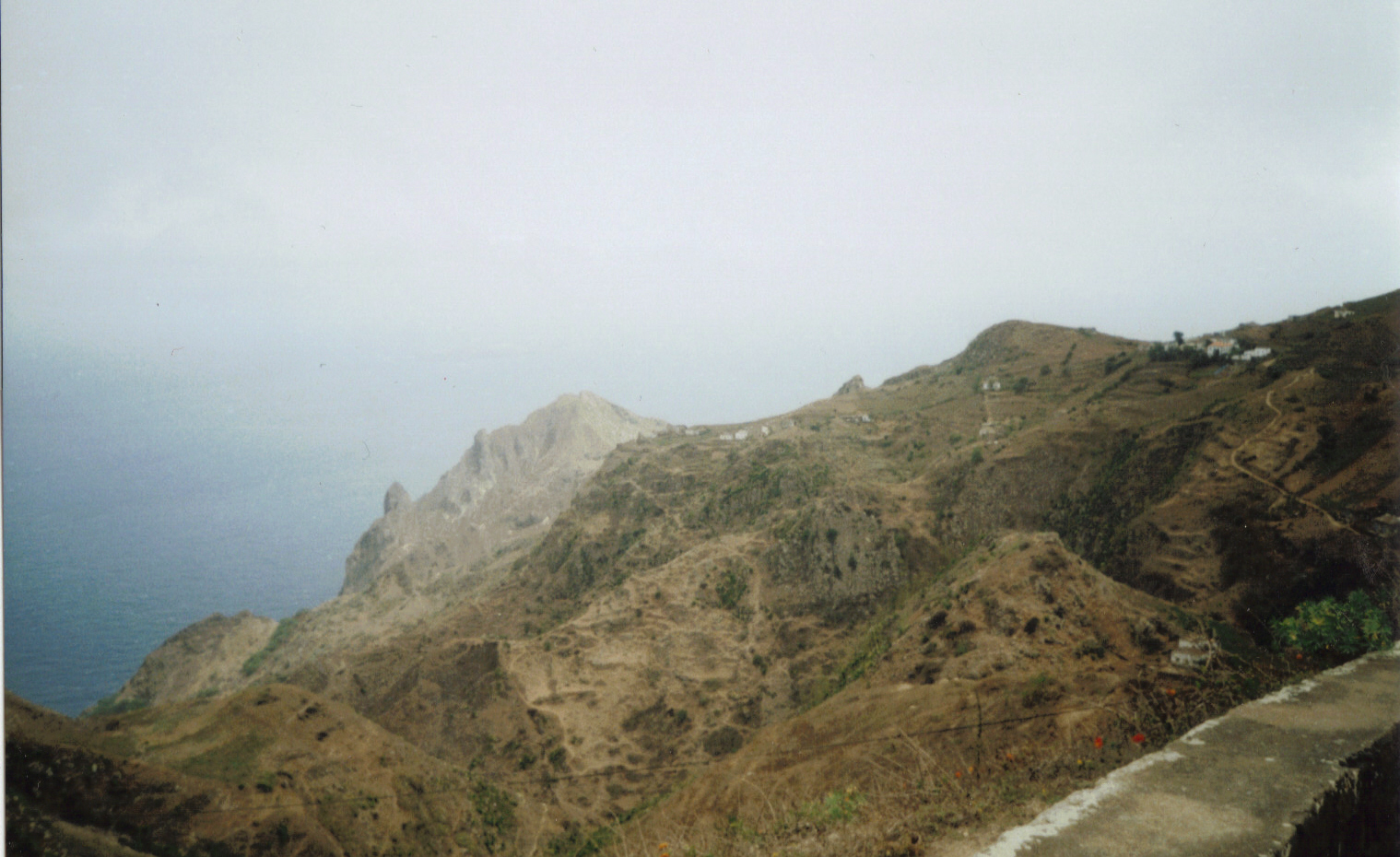
General view from the West.

Cova Rodela is a village in the middle of the island of Brava, Cape Verde. The village is situated in the mountains, 1 km west of the island capital Nova Sintra. There are good walking paths to the island's tallest mountain Monte Fontainhas. Most of the inhabitants of the village live on agriculture, growing maize and bananas. In the main street there is a noteworthy old dragon tree (Dracaena draco). Cova Rodela can be reached easily by aluguer buses from Nova Sintra and from other villages on Brava.

Many windows in Cova Rodela look similar to those which were common in New England in the 19th century.
