= Fajã de Água =

- Settlement
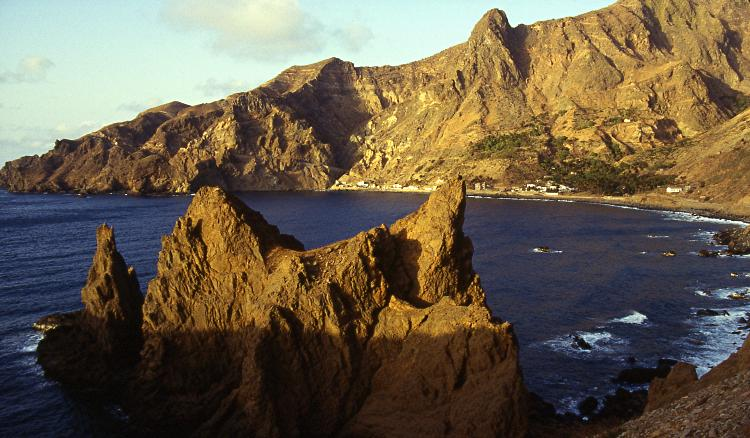
- Bay of Fajã with Fajã de Água in the background

- Location within Cape Verde
- Coordinates: 14.873°N 24.732°W
- Country: Cape Verde
- Island: Brava
- Municipality: Brava
- Civil parish: Nossa Senhora do Monte
- Elevation: 7 m (23 ft)

Population (2010)
  - Total: 126
- ID: 91205

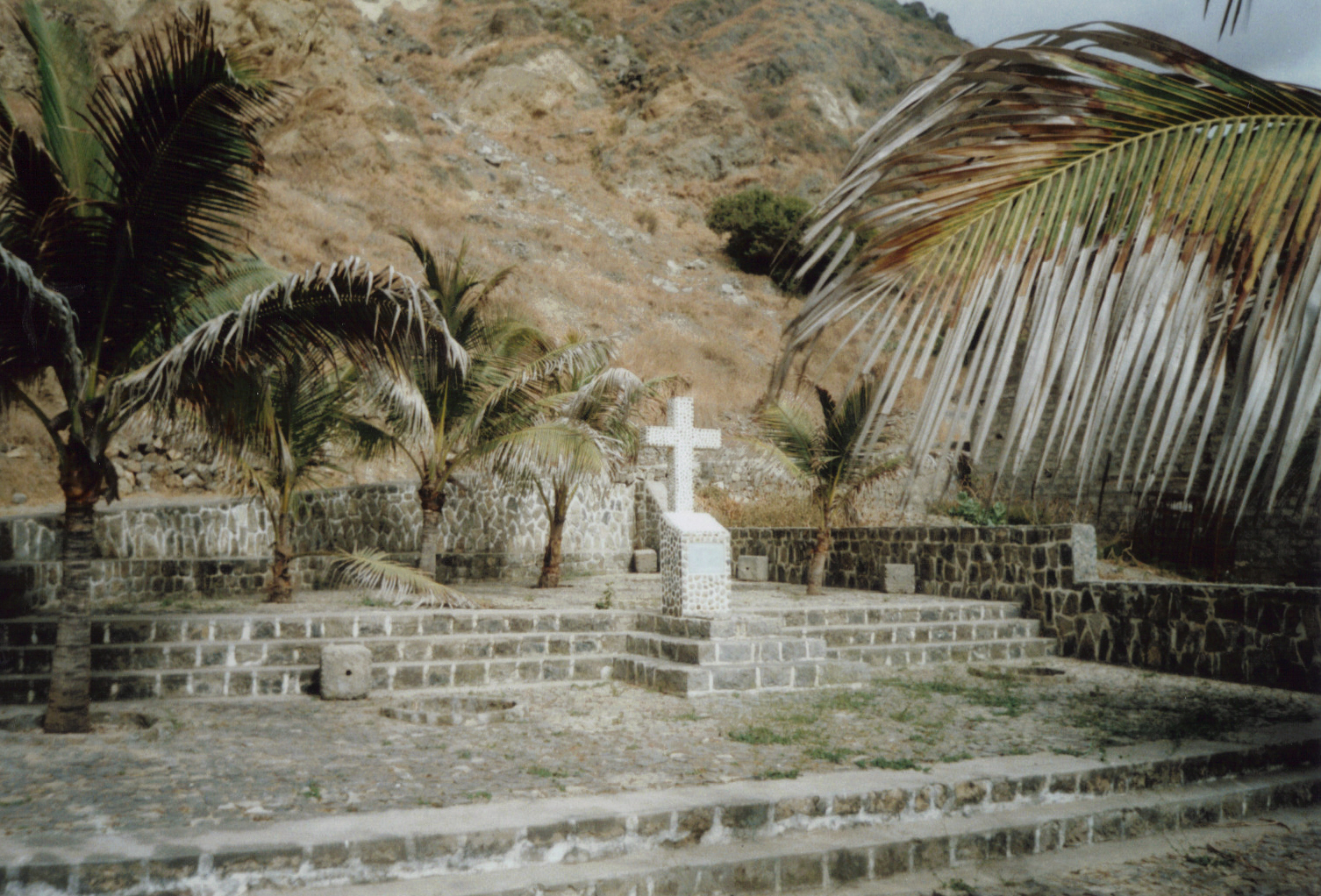
Matilde monument.

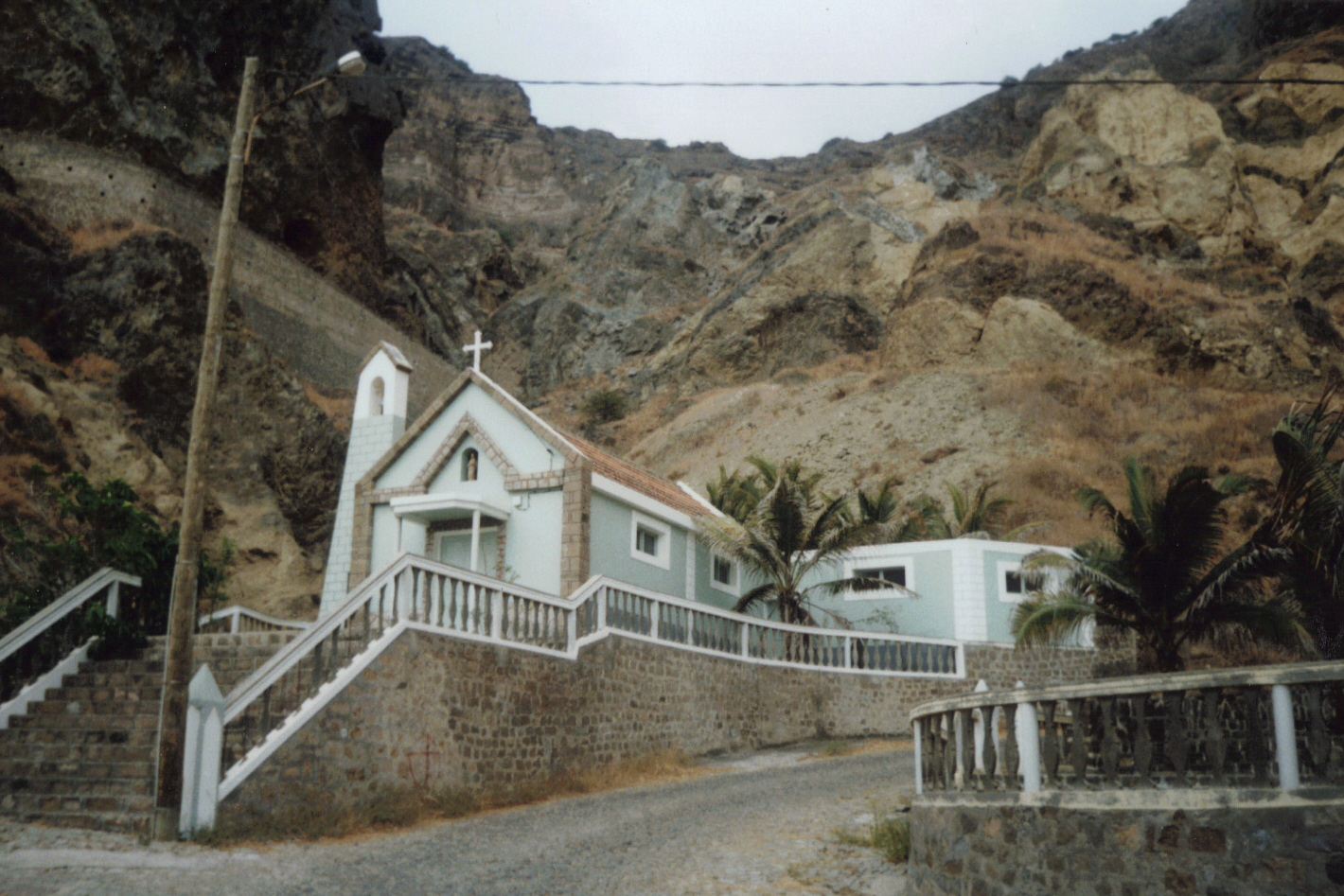
Church.

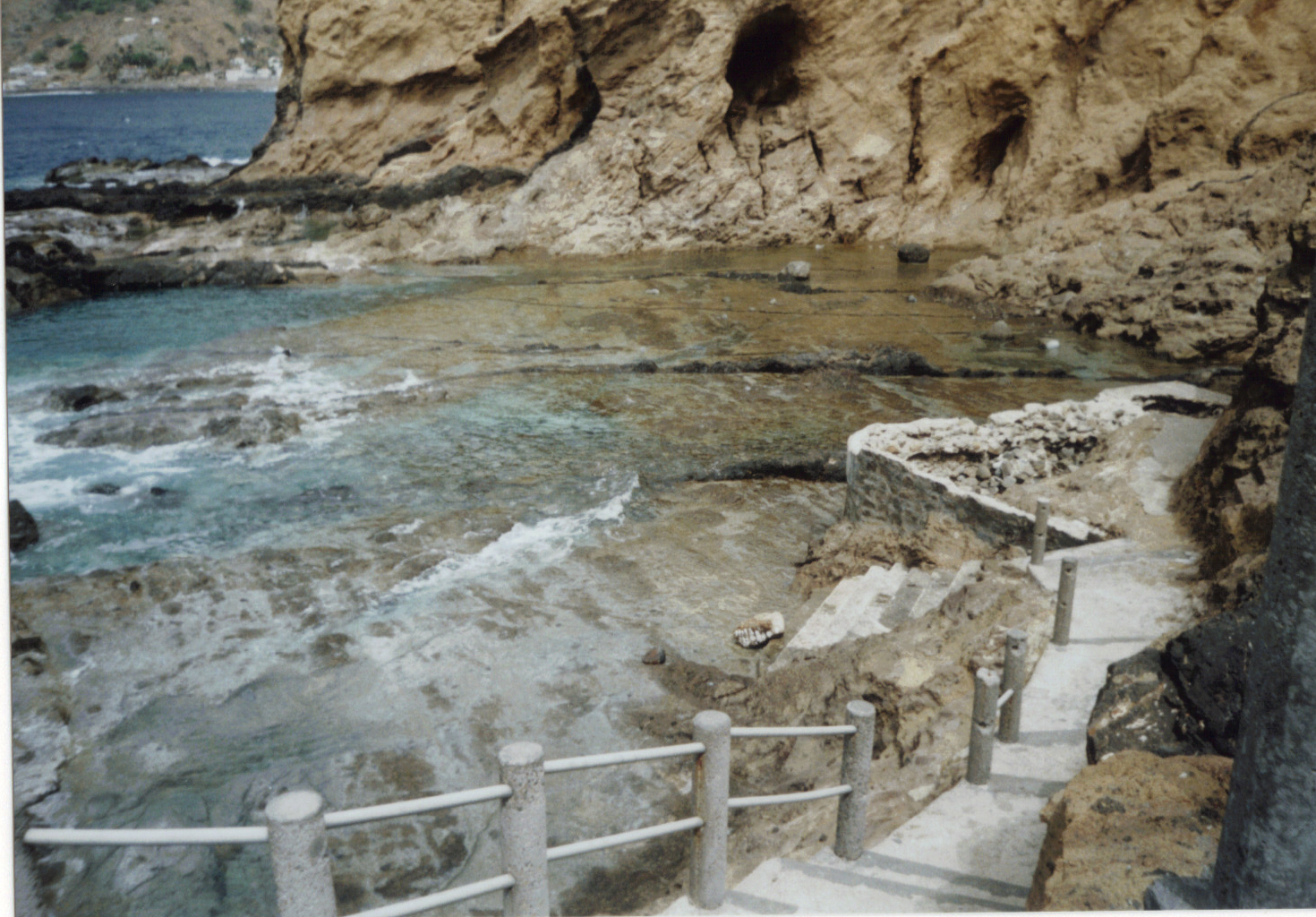
Natural swimming pol.

Fajã de Agua is a village on the northwestern coast of the island of Brava, Cape Verde. It is 4 km west of the island capital Nova Sintra. Fishing and agriculture (maize, beans, bananas and papayas) are the most important sources of income.

== History ==
The point was mentioned as Faciend de Agoa in the 1747 map by Jacques-Nicolas Bellin.

In the 18th and 19th century, whaling was an important source of income for Brava. Many whaling ships from America landed in Fajã de Água. Fajã de Água used to be the most important harbour of Brava until 1843 when the present harbour of Furna was founded. A small airport named Esperadinha with a paved runway was inaugurated in Fajã de Água in 1992. It connected Brava with the nearby islands of Fogo and Santiago, but was closed in 2004 because of frequent strong winds which make landing impossible.

== Sights ==
There is a walking track to the pilgrimage church of Nossa Senhora do Monte in the middle of the island. There is a natural swimming pool approximately one kilometer south of Fajã de Água. Further south is Porto do Portete, a dark sandy beach that is difficult to access.

Opposite the small church at the Northern end of Main Street there is a sightworthy monument (Monumento aos Emigrantes) which was erected in 1993. It reminds on the sailing ship Matilde which left Fajã de Água for America on 21 August 1943. It was lost in the Atlantic Ocean and 51 persons lost their lives. Nearly every family in Fajã de Água lost one or more relatives.

== See also ==
- List of villages and settlements in Cape Verde
