= Gibberula elvirae =

Scientific classification
- Kingdom: Animalia
- Phylum: Mollusca
- Class: Gastropoda
- Subclass: Caenogastropoda
- Order: Neogastropoda
- Family: Cystiscidae
- Subfamily: Cystiscinae
- Genus: Gibberula
- Species: G. elvirae

Binomial name
- Gibberula elvirae Moreno, 2012

Species of gastropod

Gibberula elvirae is a species of marine gastropod in the family Cystiscidae. It is endemic to Cape Verde with certain records only off São Vicente (type locality) and likely records off Brava. It inhabits the upper sublittoral zone and occurs on rocky bottoms with algae.

== Description ==
The shell measures about 4.8 mm × 3.0 mm (0.19 in × 0.12 in).
