= Ponta Jalunga =

Headland in Cape Verde

- Headland
- Coordinates: 14°53′27″N 24°40′21″W
- Location: Northeastern Brava, Cape Verde near Furna
- Offshore water bodies: Atlantic Ocean

Area
  - Total: about 100 ha

Dimensions
  - Length: 1 km
  - Width: 600-700 m

Ponta Jalunga Lighthouse
- Location: Ponta Jalunga; Furna; Cape Verde
- Coordinates: 14°53′26.2″N 24°40′25.7″W

Tower
- Constructed: 1891
- Foundation: masonry base
- Construction: masonry tower
- Height: 8 metres (26 ft)
- Shape: quadrangular tower with external staircase and lantern
- Markings: white tower, grey lantern
- Power source: solar power

Light
- Focal height: 23 metres (75 ft)
- Range: 5 nautical miles (9.3 km; 5.8 mi)
- Characteristic: Fl (2+1) W 15s.
- Cape Verde no.: PT-2184

Ponta Jalunga is a headland located nearly a kilometre northeast of the port of Furna on the island of Brava in southwestern Cape Verde. It is the northeasternmost point of the island. The promontory is a rocky area, up to 120 meters high. The headland was mentioned as Pt. Ghelongo in the 1747 map by Jacques-Nicolas Bellin.

== Ponta Jalunga Lighthouse ==
The lighthouse at Ponta Jalunga was constructed in 1891. It is a white masonry tower. It is 8 metres tall and its focal height is at 26 metres above sea level. Its range extends to 5 nautical miles (9.3 km; 5.8 mi) and its light source as with many other lighthouses is solar powered.

== See also ==
- List of lighthouses in Cape Verde
