= Lem, Cape Verde =

Lem
- Settlement
- Coordinates: 14.8784°N 24.6958°W
- Country: Cape Verde
- Island: Brava
- Municipality: Brava
- Civil parish: São João Baptista
- Elevation: 228 m (748 ft)

Population (2010)
  - Total: 539
- ID: 91104

Lem is a settlement located in the north of the island Brava, Cape Verde, just 1 km north of the island capital Nova Sintra. Its population in 2010 was 282.
