= Cachaço =

- Settlement
- Coordinates: 14.837°N 24.697°W
- Country: Cape Verde
- Island: Brava
- Municipality: Brava
- Civil parish: São João Baptista
- Elevation: 592 m (1,942 ft)

Population (2010)
  - Total: 228
- ID: 91110

Cachaço is a village on the island of Brava, Cape Verde. It is situated in the mountains, 4 km south of the island capital Nova Sintra. In 2010 its population was 228. Its elevation is 592 meters. Cachaço is the second southernmost settlement in Cape Verde, after nearby Tantum. Some 4 km south is the southernmost point in Cape Verde, Ponta Nhô Martinho.
