= Mato Grande =

- Settlement
- Coordinates: 14.863°N 24.689°W
- Country: Cape Verde
- Island: Brava
- Municipality: Brava
- Civil parish: São João Baptista

Population (2010)
  - Total: 341
- ID: 91105

Mato Grande is a settlement in the island of Brava, Cape Verde. It is situated in the mountains, 1 km southeast of the island capital Nova Sintra.
