= Nossa Senhora do Monte =

Nossa Senhora do Monte (Portuguese for Our Lady of the Mountain), may refer to the following civil parishes:

- Nossa Senhora do Monte (Portugal), a civil parish in the municipality and a suburb of Funchal in the Portuguese islands of Madeira.
- Nossa Senhora do Monte (Brava), a civil parish of Cape Verde covering the western part of the island of Brava.
- Basilica of Our Lady of the Mount, Bandra built in former Portuguese India.
