= Tantum =

- Settlement
- Coordinates: 14.836°N 24.736°W
- Country: Cape Verde
- Island: Brava
- Municipality: Brava
- Civil parish: Nossa Senhora do Monte
- Elevation: 228 m (748 ft)

Population (2010)
  - Total: 282
- ID: 91206

Tantum or Lomba Tantum is a small settlement located in the southwest corner of the island Brava, Cape Verde. It is one of the southernmost settlements in Cape Verde, together with nearby Cachaço. Its 2010 population was 282. It sits at an elevation of 228 metres (748 ft). It is situated in the mountains near the south coast, 6 km (3.7 mi) southwest of the island capital Nova Sintra.
