= Campo Baixo =

- Settlement
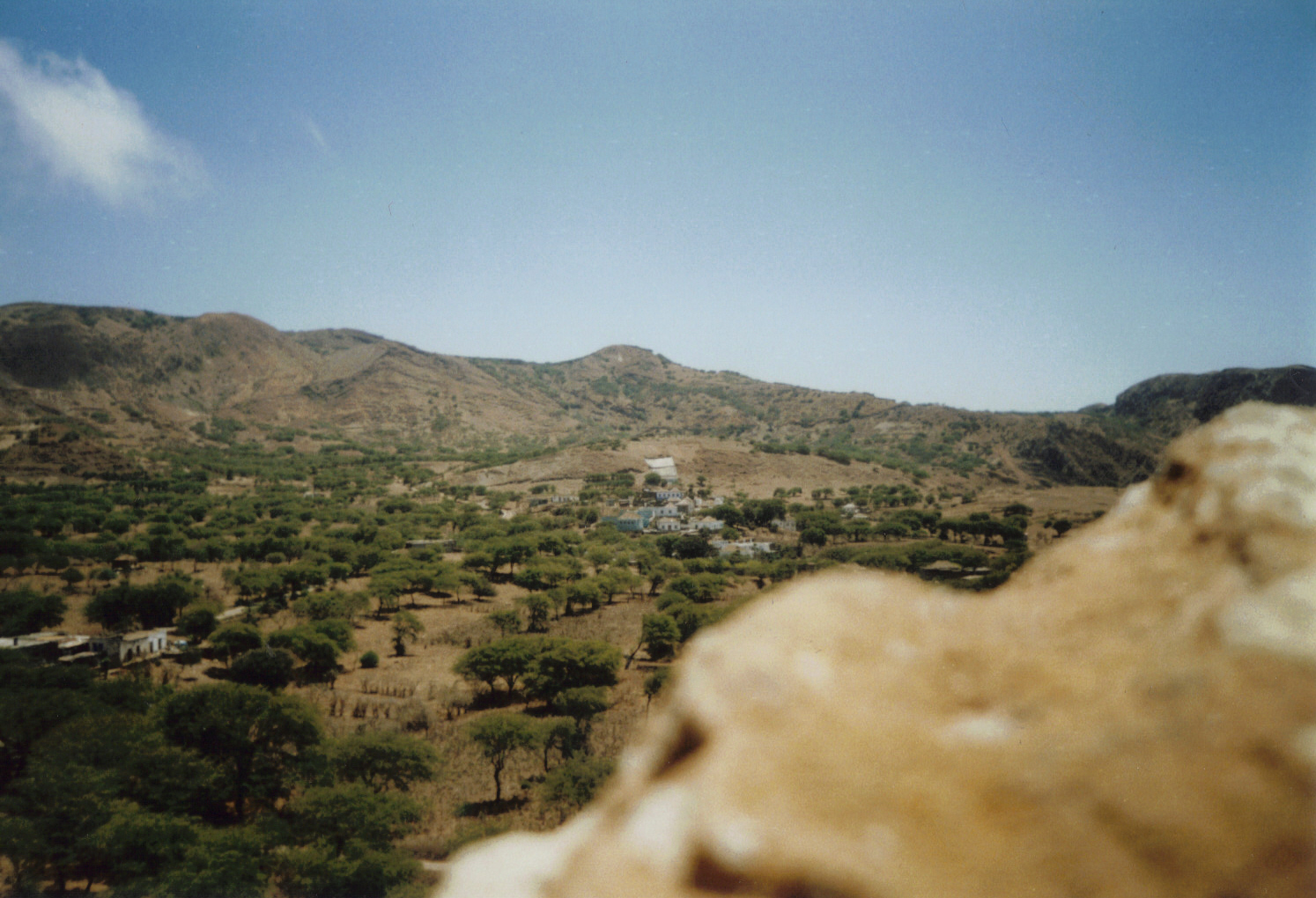

- Location within Cape Verde
- Coordinates: 14.848°N 24.722°W
- Country: Cape Verde
- Island: Brava
- Municipality: Brava
- Civil parish: Nossa Senhora do Monte
- Elevation: 650 m (2,130 ft)

Population (2010)
  - Total: 169
- ID: 91202

Campo Baixo is a small settlement located in the southwestern part of the island of Brava, Cape Verde. In English, the name of the village means 'low field'. Campo Baixo is situated in the mountains, 1.5 km (0.93 mi) southwest of Nossa Senhora do Monte and 4 km (2.5 mi) southwest of the island capital Nova Sintra. From Nossa Senhora do Monte, Campo Baixo is accessible by Aluguer buses.

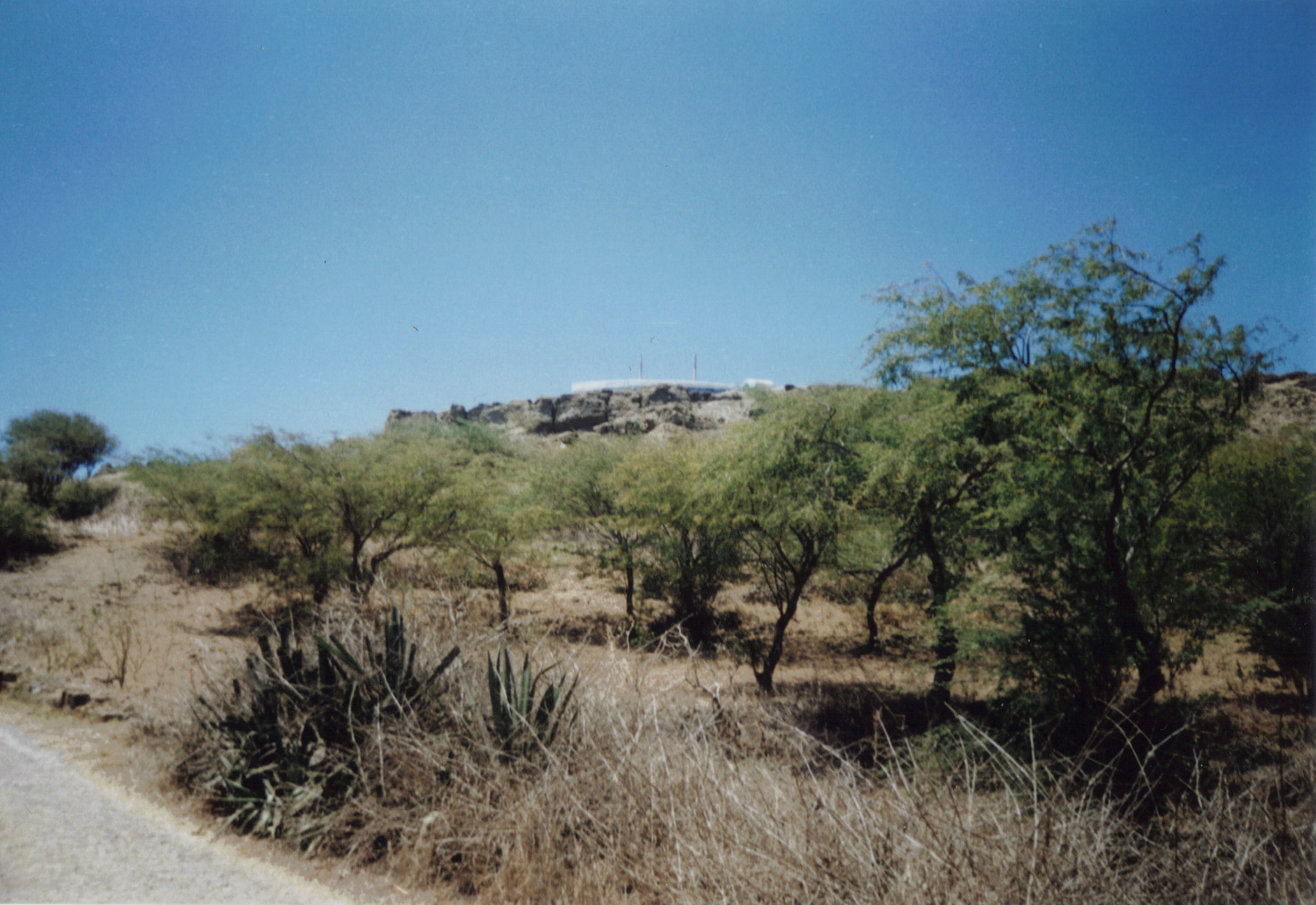
View to the chapel.

Near Campo Baixo, there is a small chapel on a hill that is shaped like a ship. The name Santa Maria, referring to Christopher Columbus' ship, is painted on the ship. There are similar monuments and chapels in other places in Cape Verde as well, such as in Nova Sintra.
