= Esperadinha Airport =

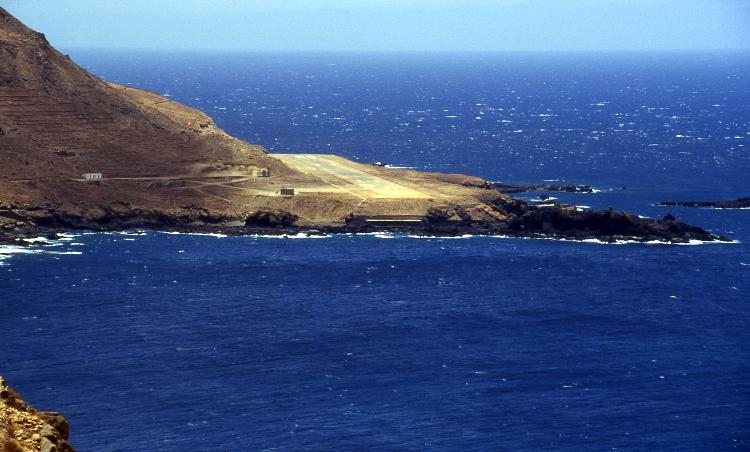
- The airport in 1994
- IATA: BVR; ICAO: GVBR

Summary
- Airport type: Public
- Serves: Brava island
- Location: Cape Verde
- Opened: 1992
- Closed: 2004
- Elevation AMSL: 64 ft / 20 m
- Coordinates: 14°51′51.6″N 24°44′45.5″W

Map
- Location of Esperadinha Airport in Cape Verde

Runways
Direction	Length		Surface
Direction	ft	m	Surface
05/23	1,890	576	Asphalt
- Source: Landings.com

Esperadinha Airport (IATA: BVR, ICAO: GVBR) was a public use airport located near the hamlet of Esperadinha, northwestern Brava, Cape Verde. It opened in 1992 and operated until 2004, when it was closed due to persistent dangerous high winds.

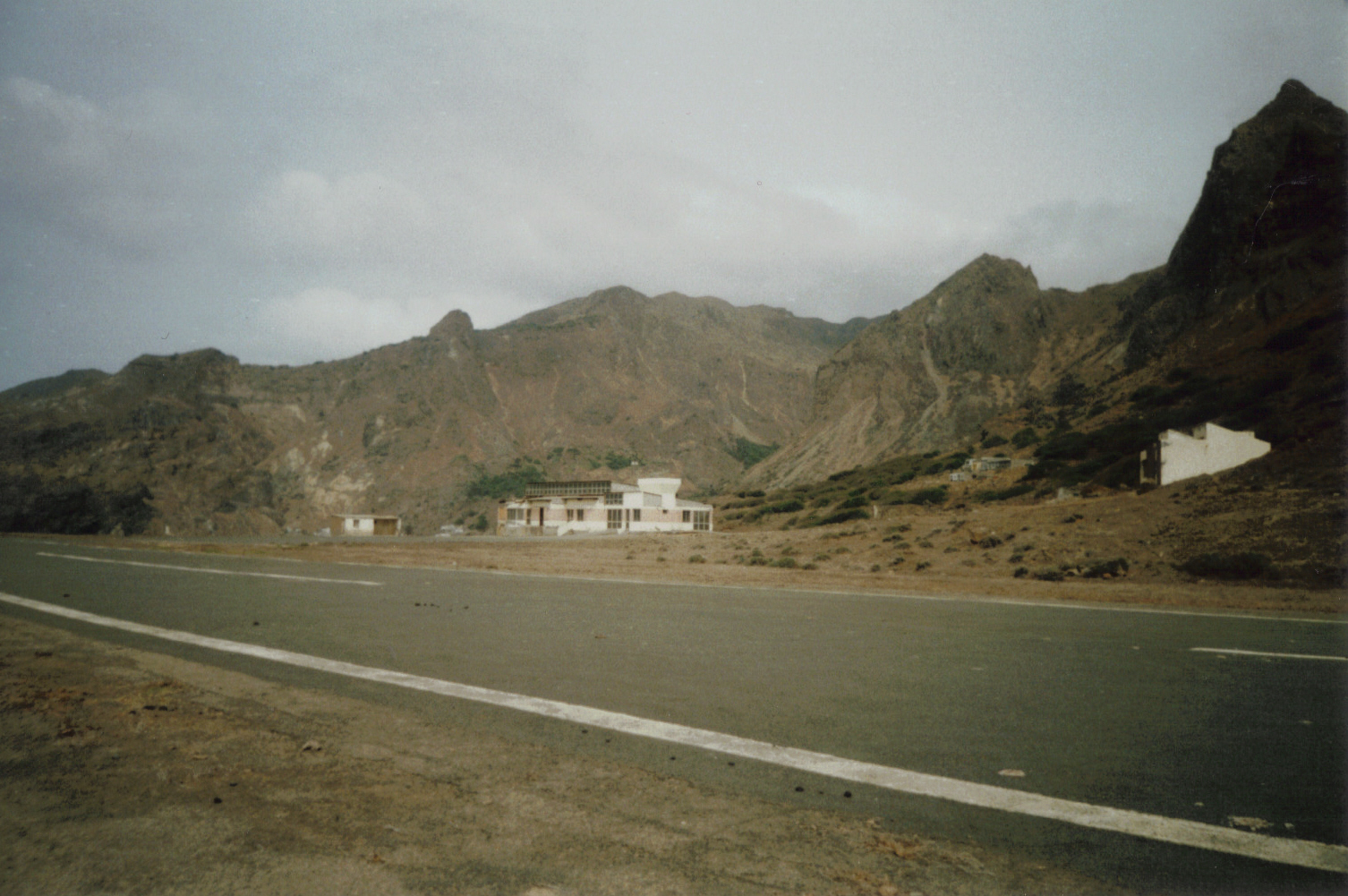
Former airport.

== See also ==
- List of airports in Cape Verde
