= Nossa Senhora do Monte, Cape Verde =

Nossa Senhora do Monte
- Settlement
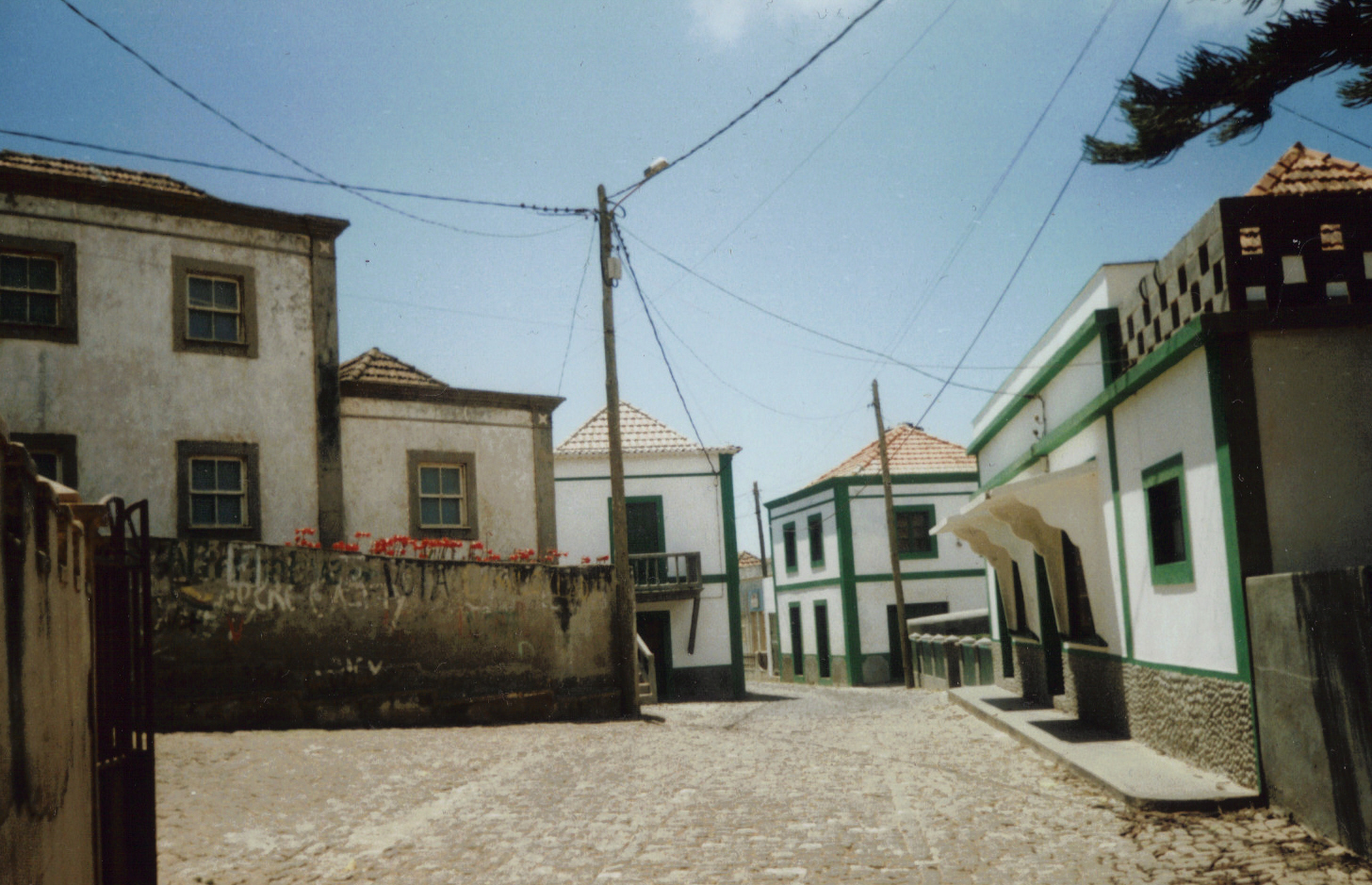
- Main Street

- Location within Cape Verde
- Coordinates: 14.858°N 24.718°W
- Country: Cape Verde
- Island: Brava
- Municipality: Brava
- Civil parish: Nossa Senhora do Monte
- Elevation: 642 m (2,106 ft)

Population (2010)
  - Total: 271
- Postal code: 9110
- ID: 91208

Nossa Senhora do Monte is a town located in the heart of the island of Brava, Cape Verde. It is the seat of the parish of Nossa Senhora do Monte. Its elevation is 650 m, and its population was 271 in 2010. Nossa Senhora do Monte is surrounded by mountains. Monte Fontainhas, Brava's tallest mountain reaching a height of 976 meters, is close to the village.

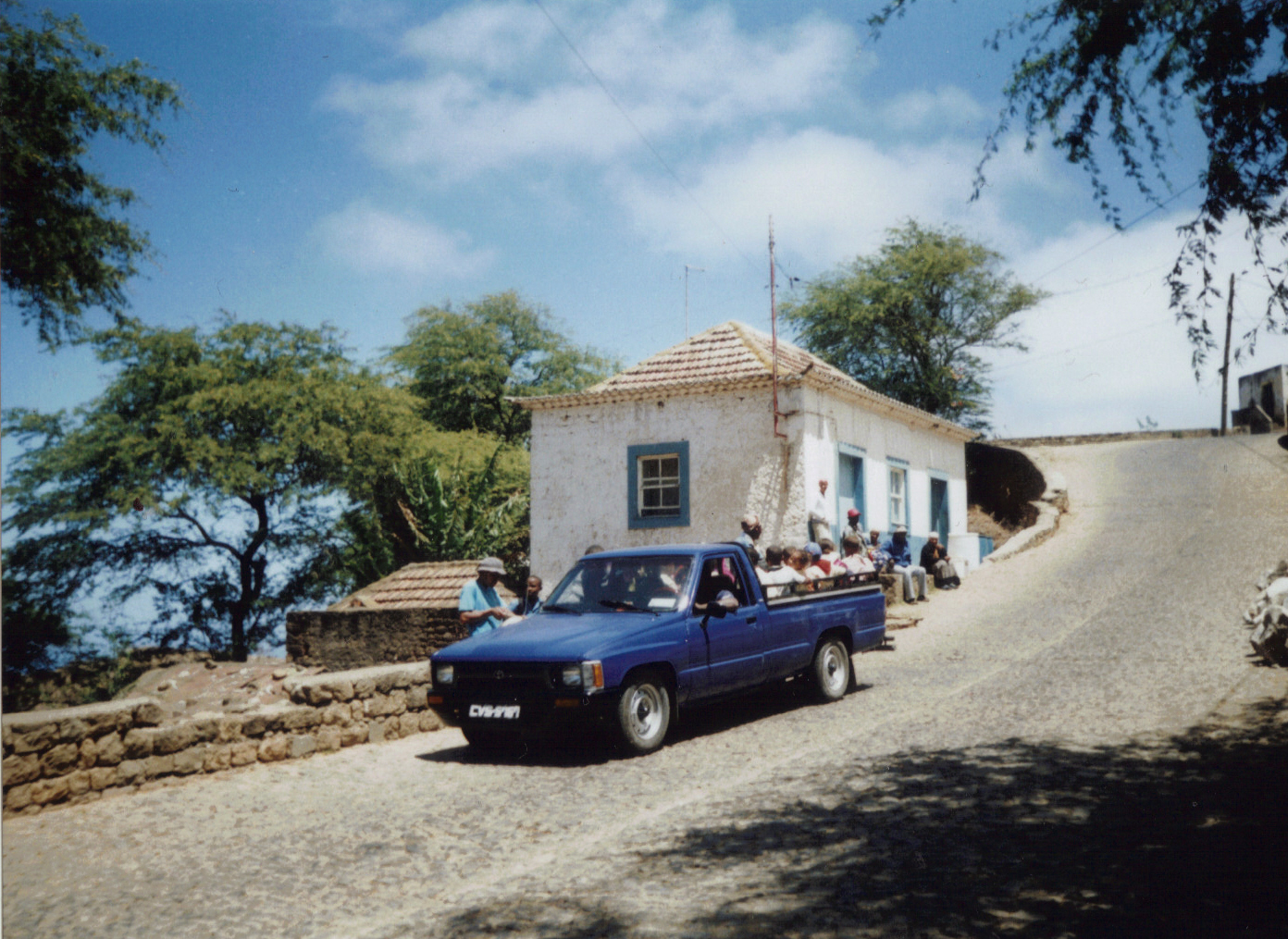
"Aluguer" bus in Nossa Senhora do Monte.

Nearby places include Cova Joana to the northeast, Mato to the southeast and Campo Baixo to the southwest.

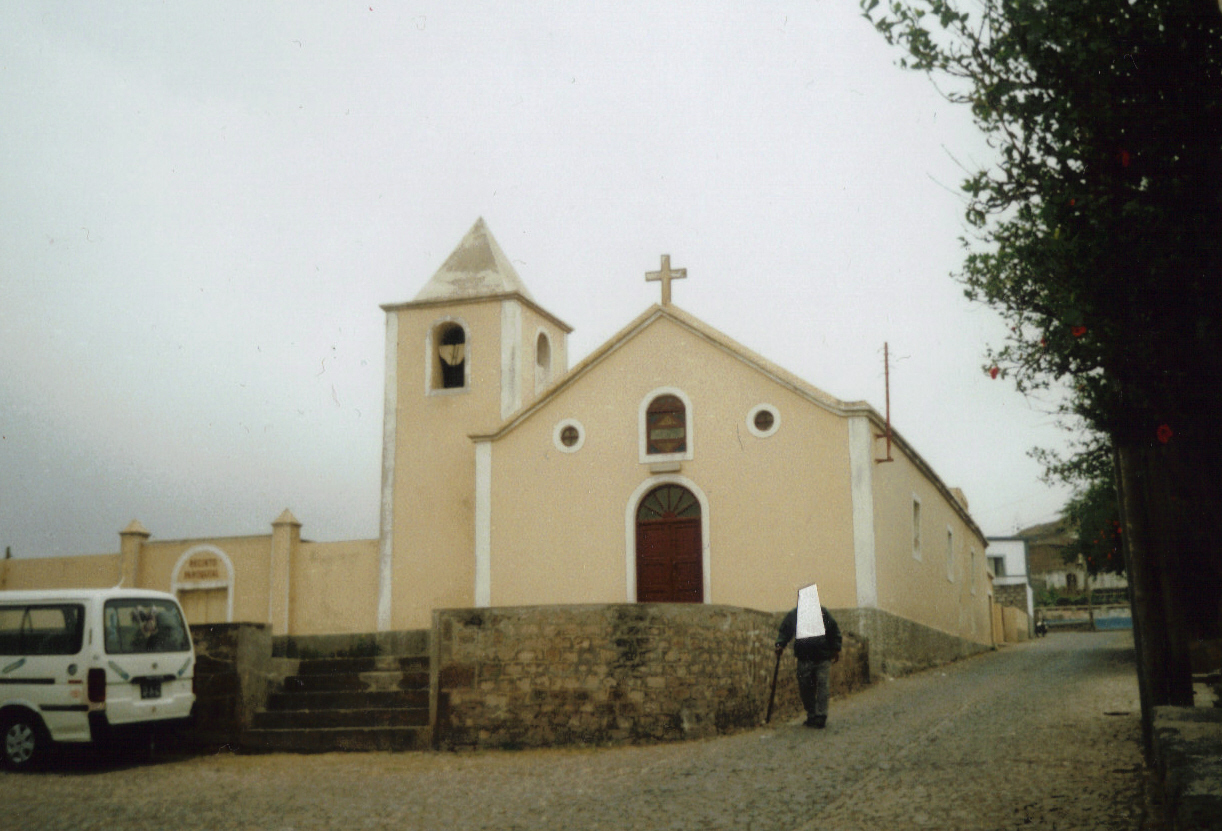
Pilgrimage Church.

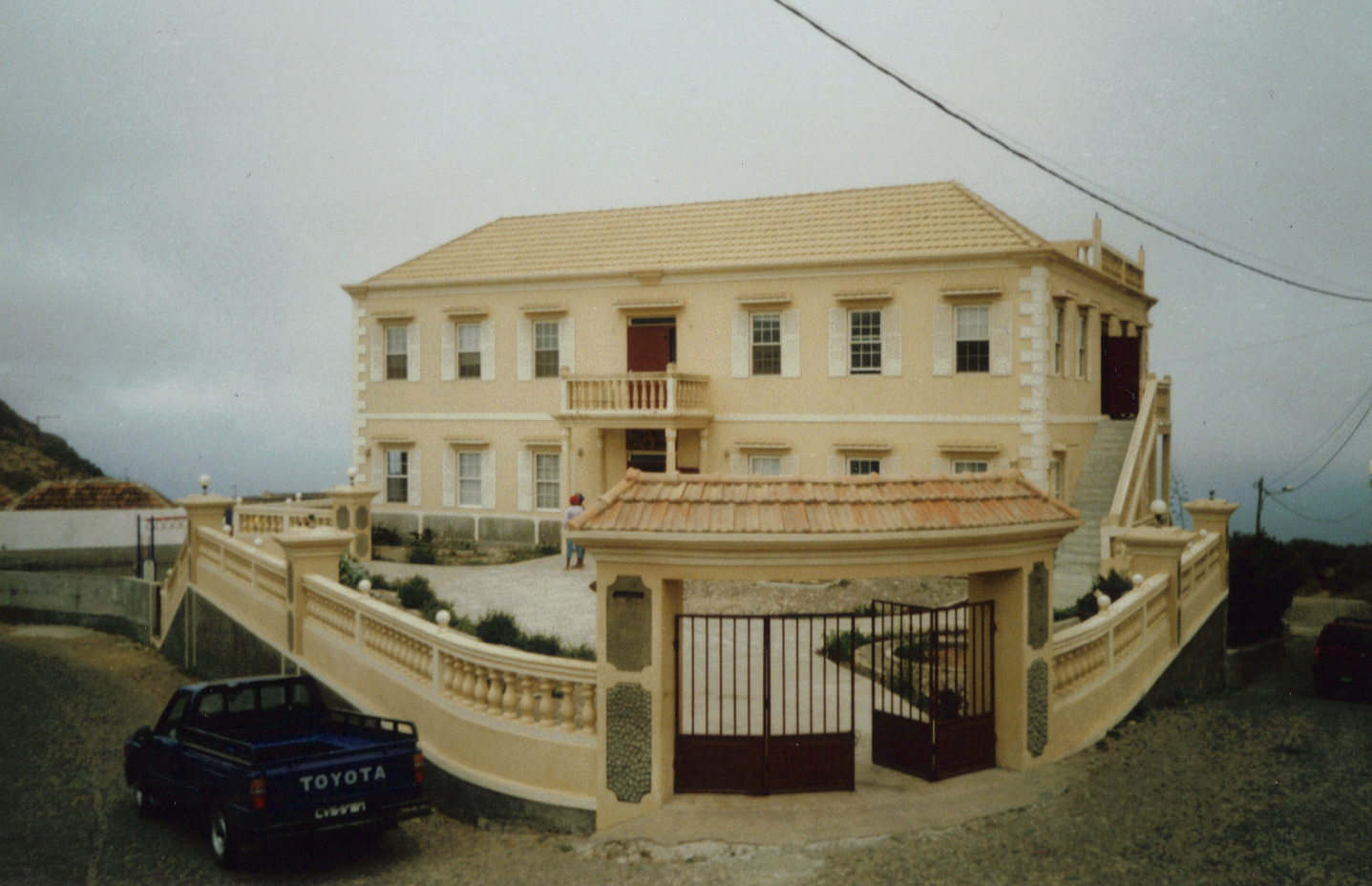
School.

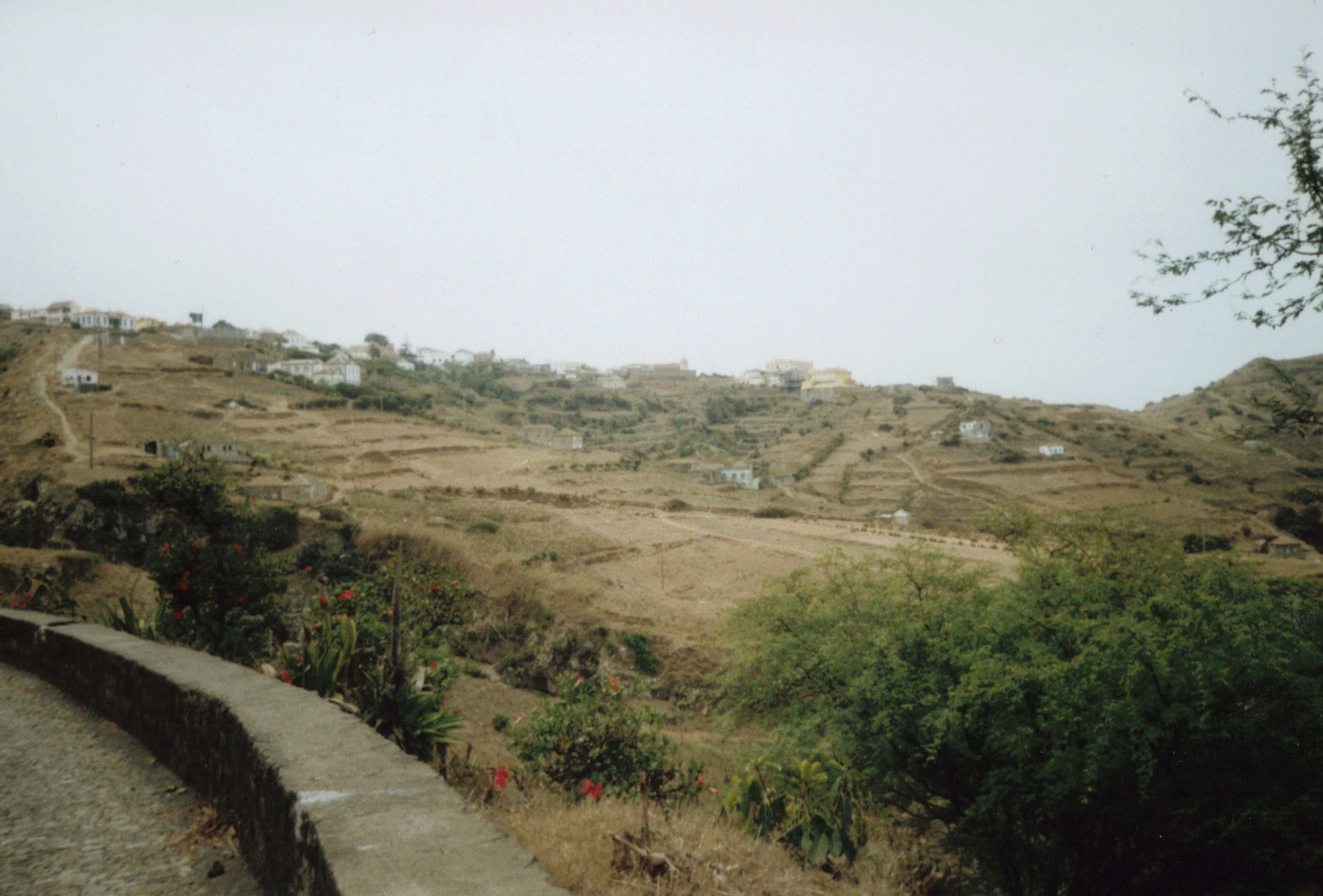
General view from the North.

It was founded in 1826, and a few years later it became the seat of a bishop. In 1862 Nossa Senhora do Monte became a place of pilgrimage. There are a sightworthy Catholic pilgrimage church and a smaller Adventist Church in the village. Several shops and small bars are to be found in Main Street. Several times a day, Nossa Senhora do Monte can be reached by "Aluguer" bus from Nova Sintra.

A small church of the Seventh-day Adventists was built in 1938.
