= São João Baptista (Brava) =

- Civil parish
- Coordinates: 14.85°N 24.69°W
- Country: Cape Verde
- Island: Brava
- Municipality: Brava

Population (2010)
  - Total: 4,054
- ID: 911

São João Baptista is a freguesia (civil parish) of Cape Verde. It covers the eastern part of the island of Brava. The parish seat is Nova Sintra. To its west is the parish of Nossa Senhora do Monte.

== Subdivisions ==
The freguesia consists of the following settlements:

- Cachaço
- Cova Rodela
- Furna
- João da Noly
- Lem
- Mato Grande
- Nova Sintra (city)
- Santa Bárbara
- Vinagre
