= Santa Bárbara, Cape Verde =

Santa Bárbara
- Settlement
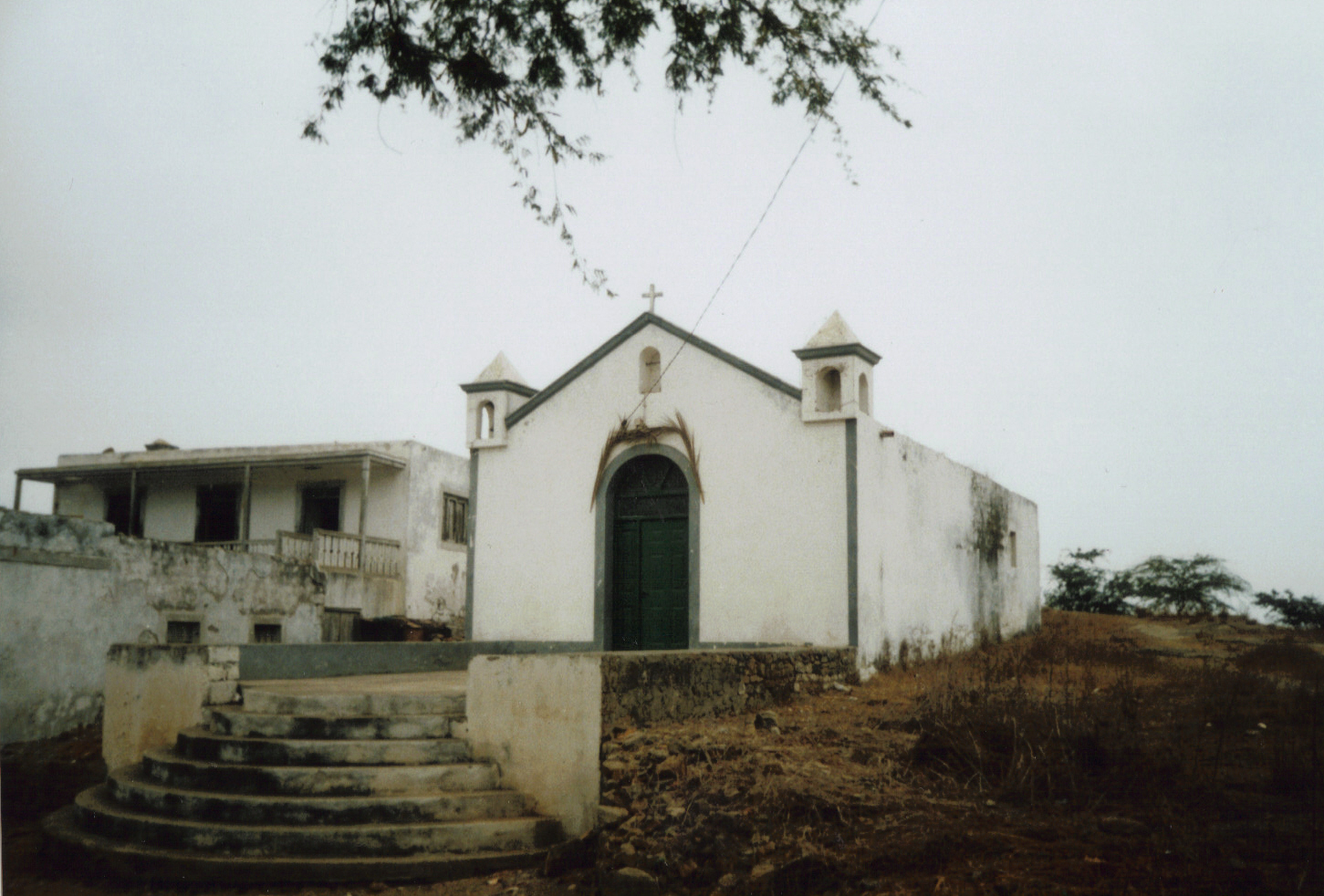
- Church

- Location within Cape Verde
- Coordinates: 14.875°N 24.685°W
- Country: Cape Verde
- Island: Brava
- Municipality: Brava
- Civil parish: São João Baptista
- Elevation: 350 m (1,150 ft)

Population (2010)
  - Total: 143
- ID: 91106

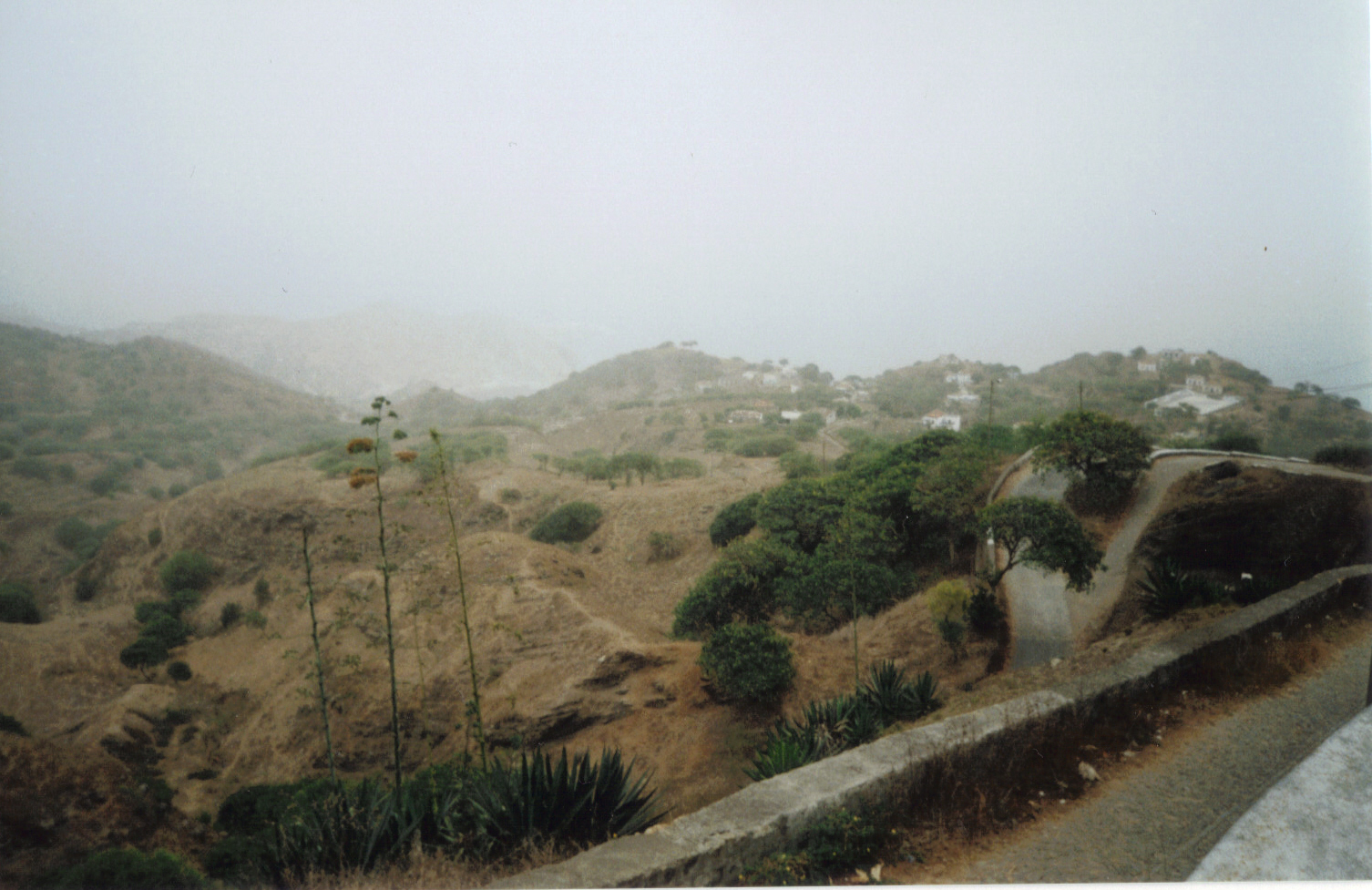
View from Nova Sintra to Santa Bárbara.

Santa Bárbara (Portuguese meaning Saint Barbara) is a village in the northeastern part of the island of Brava, Cape Verde. It is situated at 350 m elevation, close to the Atlantic coast. It is about 1 kilometer east of the island capital of Nova Sintra. To its southeast is the small village of Vinagre. Santa Bárbara can be reached by "Aluguer" buses.
