= Mato, Cape Verde =

Mato
- Settlement
- Coordinates: 14.857°N 24.706°W
- Country: Cape Verde
- Island: Brava
- Municipality: Brava
- Civil parish: Nossa Senhora do Monte
- Elevation: 770 m (2,530 ft)

Population (2010)
  - Total: 441
- ID: 91207

Mato is a settlement in the island of Brava, Cape Verde. It is situated in the mountainous interior of the island, 2 km southwest of the island capital Nova Sintra.
