= Nossa Senhora do Monte (Brava) =

- Civil parish
- Coordinates: 14.84°N 24.72°W
- Country: Cape Verde
- Island: Brava
- Municipality: Brava

Population (2010)
  - Total: 1,917
- ID: 912

Nossa Senhora do Monte is a freguesia (civil parish) of Cape Verde. It covers the western part of the island of Brava. To its east is the parish of São João Baptista.

== Subdivisions ==
The freguesia consists of the following settlements:

- Campo Baixo
- Cova Joana
- Fajã de Água
- Mato
- Nossa Senhora do Monte (town)
- Tantum
- Tomé Barraz
