= Furna (Brava) =

- Settlement
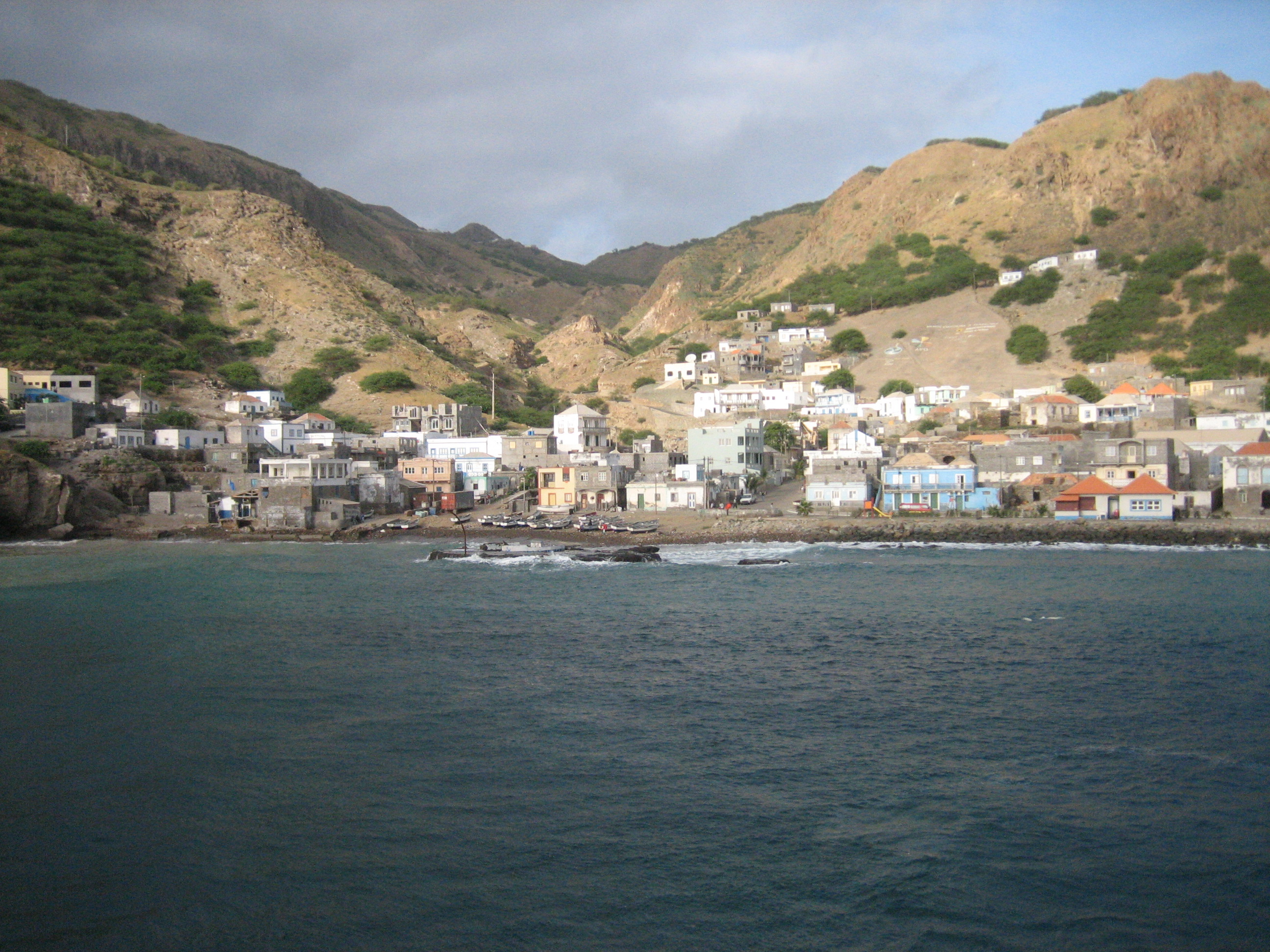
- Furna on the island of Brava, Cape Verde

- Location within Cape Verde
- Coordinates: 14.887°N 24.680°W
- Country: Cape Verde
- Island: Brava
- Municipality: Brava
- Civil parish: São João Baptista
- Elevation: 10 m (33 ft)

Population (2010)
  - Total: 612
- ID: 91102

Furna is a seaside community in the northeastern part of the island of Brava, Cape Verde. It lies 2.5 km northeast of the island capital of Nova Sintra. At the 2010 census its population was 612.

== About the village ==
The settlement was mentioned as Fuurno in the 1747 map by Jacques-Nicolas Bellin.

Furna became the most important harbour of Brava in 1843. In 1982, many boats and some houses of Furna were destroyed by waves reaching a height of up to 10 meters which were caused by the tropical storm Beryl. The harbour was improved in 2000. There are ferry connections to São Filipe in Fogo and Praia in Santiago.

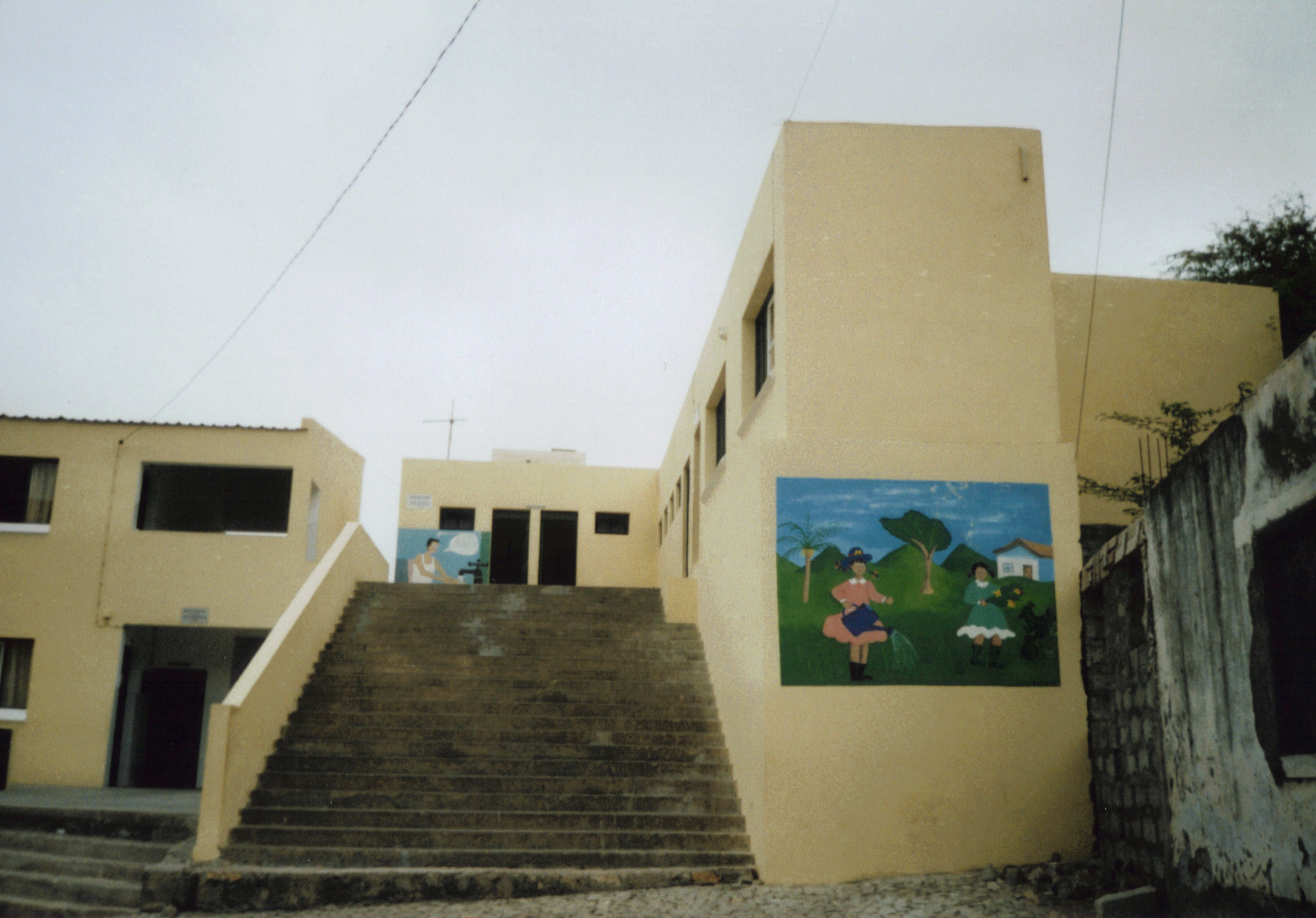
School with wall paintings

Brava has a chapel known as Nossa Senhora de Boa Viagem. The new yellow school near the small church in the South of the village, which was paid by the government of Belgium, has large wall paintings motivating the children to save as much water as possible and to help keeping the island green.

Less than a kilometer northeast of Furna is the headland Ponta Jalunga with a lighthouse.

== Gallery ==
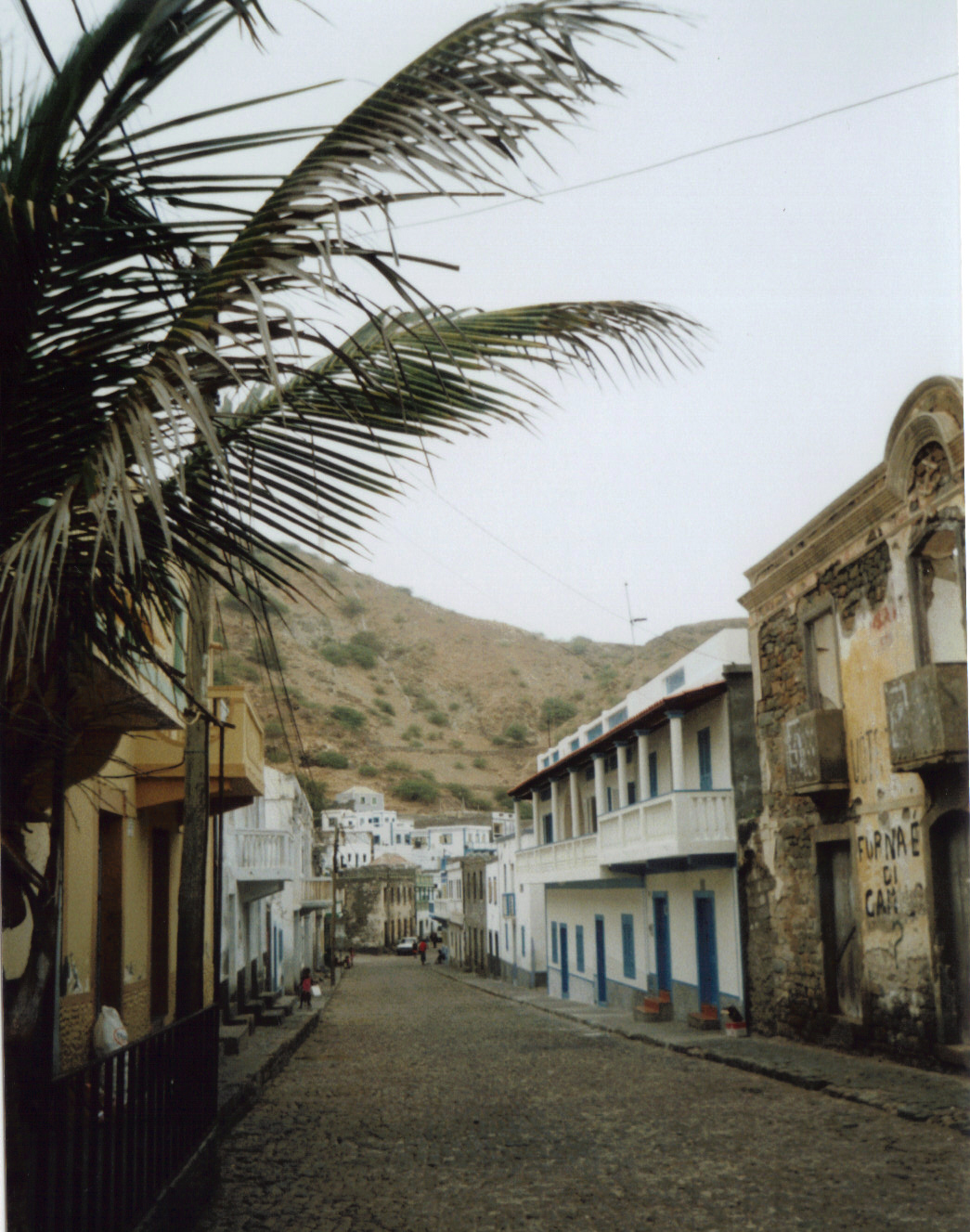
Main Street.

== See also ==
- List of villages and settlements in Cape Verde
