= Brava, Cape Verde =

Island of Cape Verde

Brava
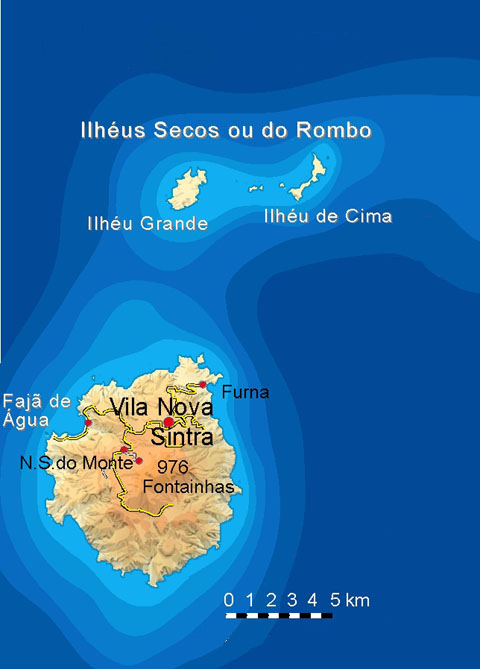

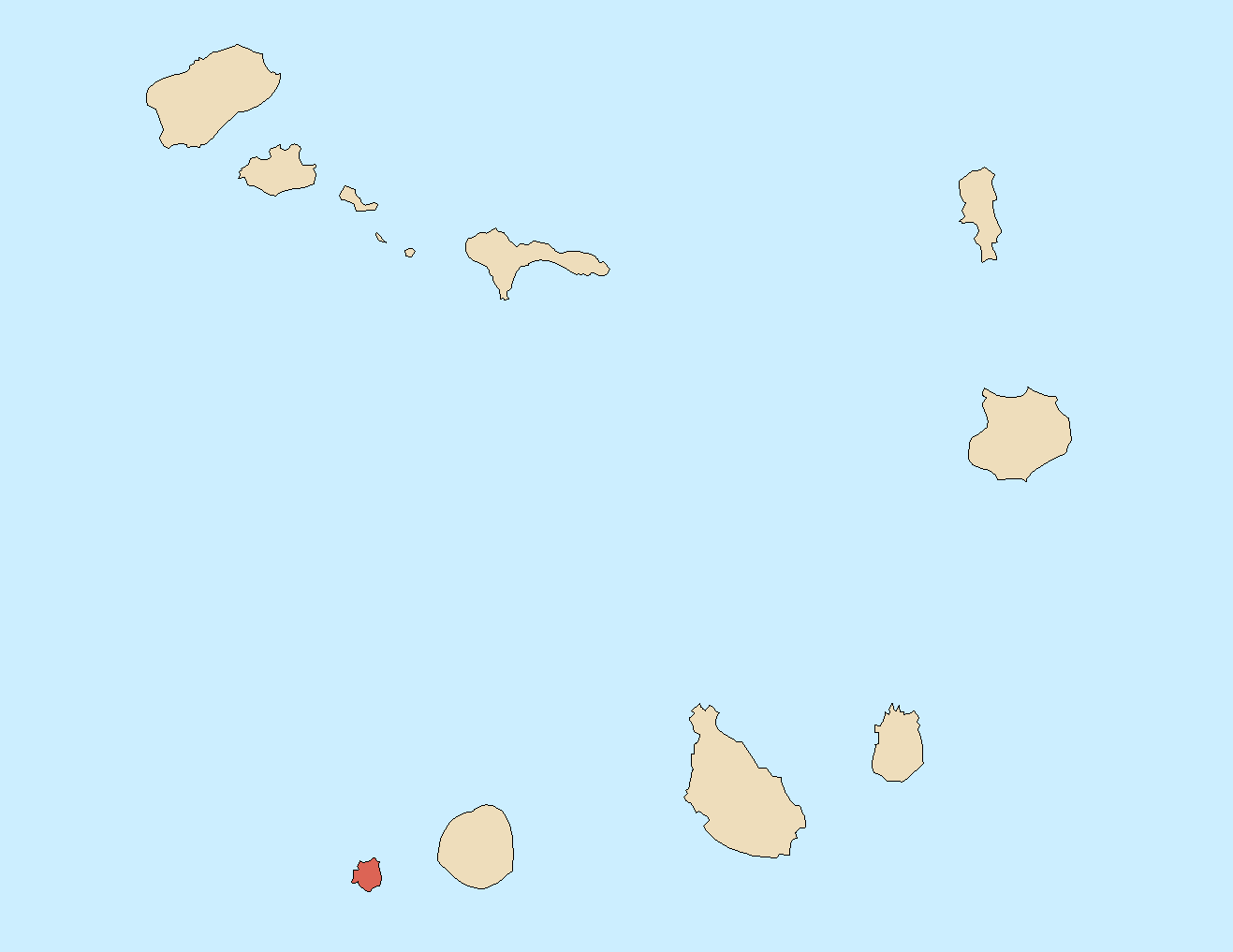

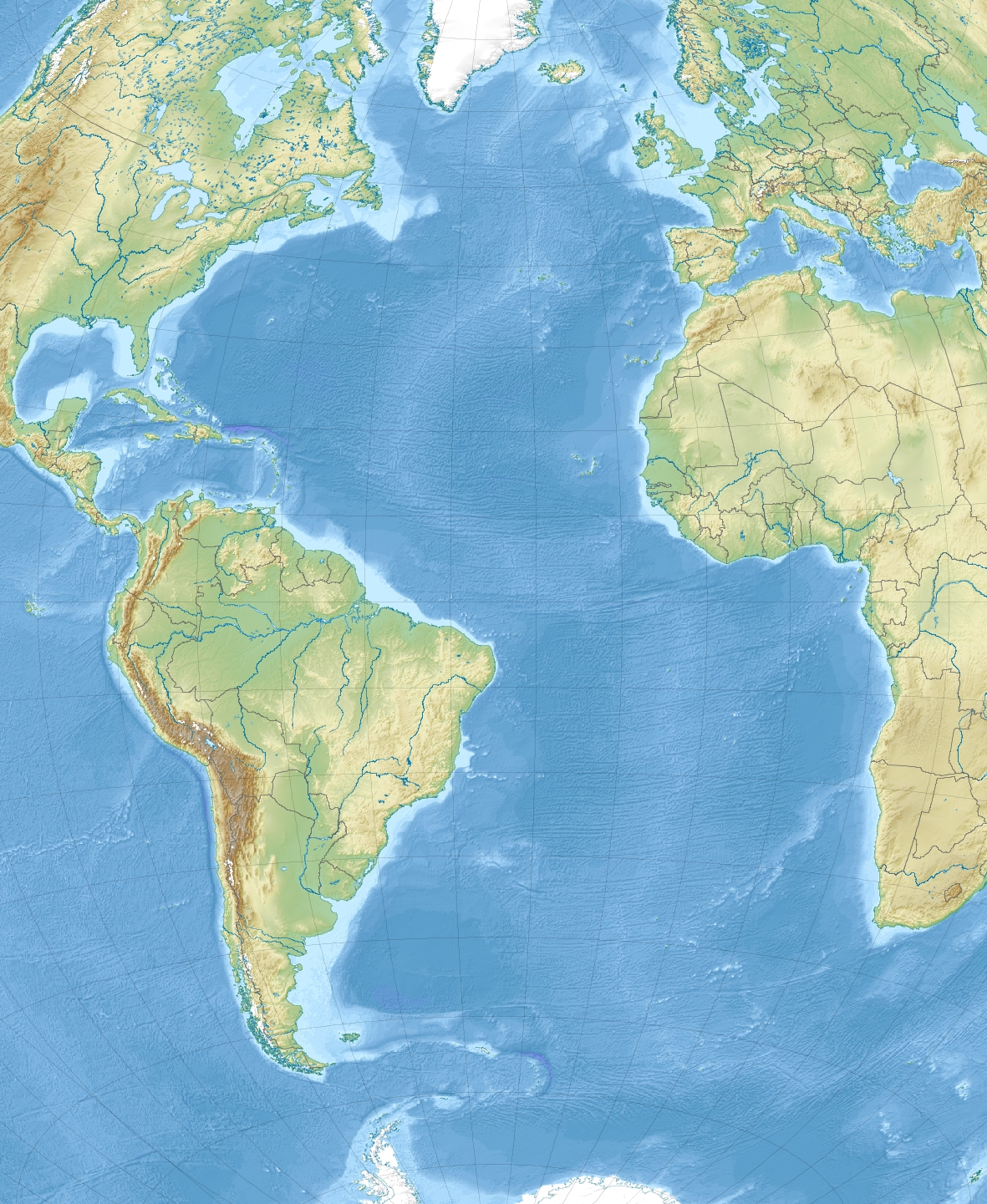
- Location within Cape Verde Location within Atlantic Ocean

Geography
- Location: Atlantic Ocean
- Coordinates: 14°52′N 24°42′W
- Area: 62.51 km^{2} (24.14 sq mi)
- Length: 10.5 km (6.52 mi)
- Width: 9.3 km (5.78 mi)
- Highest elevation: 976 m (3202 ft)
- Highest point: Monte Fontainhas

Administration
- Cape Verde
- Municipality: Brava
- Largest settlement: Nova Sintra

Demographics
- Population: 5,698 (2015)
- Pop. density: 91.2/km^{2} (236.2/sq mi)

Brava (Portuguese for 'wild') is an island in Cape Verde, and is part of the Sotavento group, in the central Atlantic Ocean. At 62.5 km^{2} (24.1 sq mi), it is the smallest inhabited island of the Cape Verde archipelago, but at the same time the greenest. First settled in the early 16th century, its population grew after Mount Fogo on neighbouring Fogo erupted in 1680. For more than a century, its main industry was whaling, but the island economy is now primarily agricultural.

== History ==
Brava was discovered in 1462 by the Portuguese explorer Diogo Afonso. There is no evidence of human presence on the Cape Verde islands before the arrival of the Portuguese. Around 1620 the population of Brava started with the arrival of settlers from Madeira and the Azores. Settlement of Brava took a rise in 1680 when it received many refugees from the nearby larger island of Fogo after its volcano erupted and covered the island with ash. Frequent pirate attacks forced the population towards the interior of the island, where the town Nova Sintra was founded around 1700.

Around 1720, the fungus Roccella tinctoria was discovered, which was traded as a textile dye. From the end of the 18th century, whaling ships from North America started hunting whales around the Azores and the Cape Verde Islands. They used the harbours of Brava (Fajã de Água and Furna) to stock up on supplies and drinking water. They hired men from Brava as sailors, and several of these men from Brava settled around the Massachusetts whaling port of New Bedford.

== Geography ==
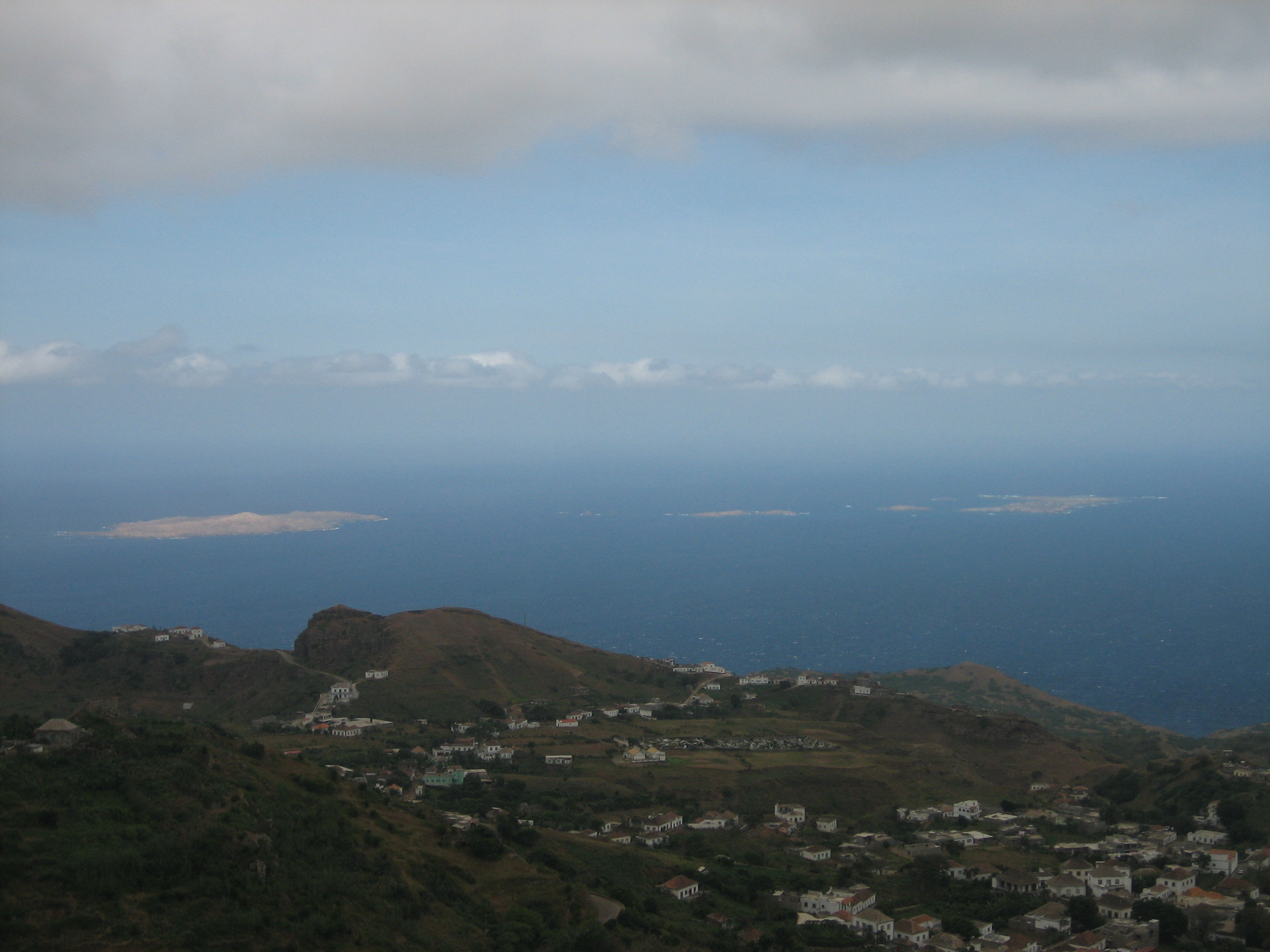
The uninhabited islets Ilhéus Secos or Ilhéus do Rombo with parts of the town of Nova Sintra.

The island of Brava is 10.5 km long (north to south) and its width is 9.3 km. Its area is 62.51 km^{2} (24.14 sq mi). Practically the whole island is a stratovolcano. It lies in the lee of the enormous Fogo volcano. Volcanic activity on the island has been mainly located along three lines, which all intersect at the crest of ground that forms the highest part of the island. Brava has no documented historical eruptions, but its youthful volcanic morphology and the fact that earthquake swarms still occur indicate the potential for future eruptions; its last eruption was during the Holocene era. 13% of the island area is forested.

North of Brava are several uninhabited islets; the largest ones are Ilhéu de Cima and Ilhéu Grande. Monte Fontainhas is the highest point on the island, reaching 976 metres elevation.

=== Climate ===
Being highly mountainous this island has a quite diverse climate. Brava island has moderate arid climate (BWh according to Köppen–Geiger climate classification system) along the coast and semi-arid mild tropical climate BSh with very balanced temperatures year round in the interior. The average annual temperature on the coast is about 23–25 °C (73–77 °F), decreasing to some 17–20 °C (63–68 °F) in the mountains. There can be remarkably cool weather with warmer wet season starting in June and ending in November with colder dry season starting in December and ending in May.

Climate data for Cachaço, south of Nova Sintra, 800 metres ASL
Month	Jan	Feb	Mar	Apr	May	Jun	Jul	Aug	Sep	Oct	Nov	Dec	Year
Mean daily maximum °C (°F)	18.7 (65.7)	18.6 (65.5)	19.4 (66.9)	19.8 (67.6)	20.4 (68.7)	21.0 (69.8)	22.2 (72.0)	23.1 (73.6)	23.3 (73.9)	22.6 (72.7)	21.7 (71.1)	19.6 (67.3)	20.9 (69.6)
Daily mean °C (°F)	16.2 (61.2)	16.1 (61.0)	16.6 (61.9)	16.9 (62.4)	17.6 (63.7)	18.4 (65.1)	19.4 (66.9)	20.5 (68.9)	20.8 (69.4)	20.4 (68.7)	19.1 (66.4)	17.4 (63.3)	18.3 (64.9)
Mean daily minimum °C (°F)	13.8 (56.8)	13.6 (56.5)	13.8 (56.8)	14.1 (57.4)	14.9 (58.8)	15.8 (60.4)	16.7 (62.1)	17.9 (64.2)	18.4 (65.1)	18.2 (64.8)	16.5 (61.7)	15.2 (59.4)	16.9 (62.4)
Average rainfall mm (inches)	11 (0.4)	5 (0.2)	1 (0.0)	0 (0)	0 (0)	0 (0)	17 (0.7)	83 (3.3)	123 (4.8)	53 (2.1)	33 (1.3)	20 (0.8)	346 (13.6)
Source: climate-data.org

== Municipality ==
Administratively, the island of Brava is covered by one municipality, Concelho da Brava. This municipality consists of two freguesias (civil parishes): São João Baptista and Nossa Senhora do Monte. The municipal seat is the city Nova Sintra.

=== Politics ===
Since 2012, the Movement for Democracy (MpD) is the ruling party of the municipality, and its president is Orlando da Luz Vieira Balla. The results of the latest elections, in 2016:

Party	Municipal Council		Municipal Assembly	
Party	Votes%	Seats	Votes%	Seats
MpD	58.99	5	57.55	8
PAICV	39.17	0	40.48	5

== Population ==
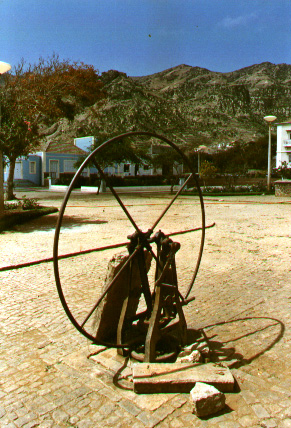
Nova Sintra

The island's main town is Nova Sintra. The island's two parishes São João Baptista and Nossa Senhora do Monte are subdivided into 16 population zones for statistical purposes:

São João Baptista

- Cachaço
- Cova Rodela
- Furna
- João da Noly
- Lem
- Mato Grande
- Nova Sintra (city)
- Santa Bárbara
- Vinagre

Nossa Senhora do Monte

- Campo Baixo
- Cova Joana
- Fajã de Água
- Mato
- Nossa Senhora do Monte (town)
- Tantum
- Tomé Barraz

=== Demographics ===
In the 1830s, the population was estimated at 8,000.

Population of Brava (1940–2015)
Year	Population
1940	8,528
1950	7,937
1960	8,625
1970	7,756
1980	6,985
1990	6,975
2000	6,820
2010	5,995
2015	5,698

== Economy ==
The economy of the island is mainly based on (irrigated) agriculture and fishing. Main agricultural goods include coffee, potatoes, sweet potatoes, corn (maize), banana and sugar cane.

== Attractions ==
- Nova Sintra, a town with a museum, traditional Portuguese architecture, several churches and shops.
- Fajã de Agua, a small harbour on the West coast with a natural swimming pool.
- Nossa Senhora do Monte, a village in the mountains with a pilgrimage church.
- Cova Rodela, a village in the mountains with a dragon tree in its main street.

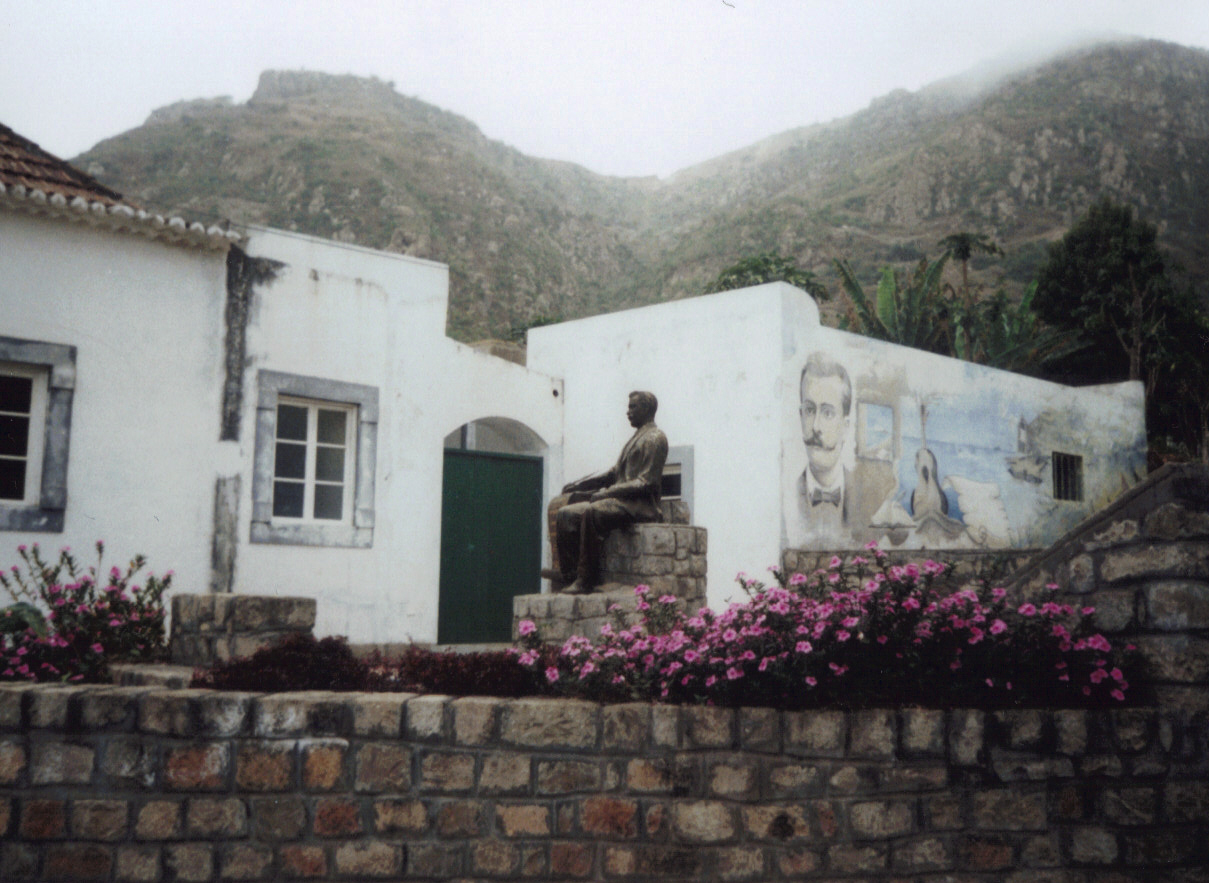
A monument to Eugênio Tavares

== Sports ==
There are several football clubs on Brava, organised by the Brava Regional Football Association.

== Infrastructure ==
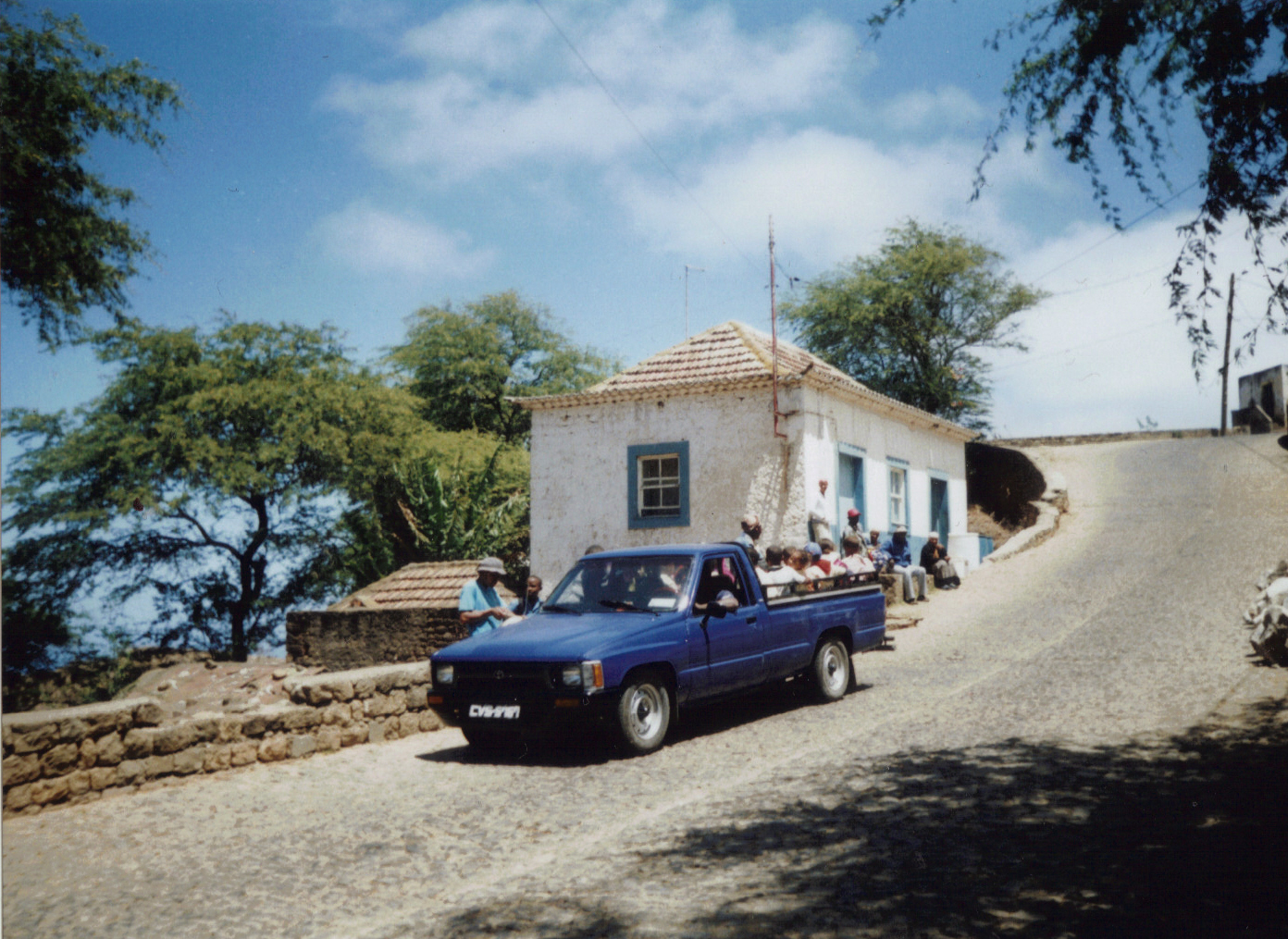
"Aluguer" bus in the village Nossa Senhora do Monte.

The Esperadinha Airport, inaugurated in 1992, was closed in 2004 because of persisting strong winds. The village of Furna has a commercial port, the other port is Fajã de Água which is only used for fishing. Ferries to the islands of Fogo and Santiago depart from Furna. On Brava the villages may be reached by "Aluguer" bus. There is no fixed schedule, as the aluguers travel only when there are sufficient passengers. Taxis are not available.

== Notable residents ==
- Eugénio Tavares, musician and poet; he used the traditional morna and wrote in Cape Verdean Creole. A statue dedicated to Eugénio Tavares is in the main square of Vila Nova Sintra, surrounded by a garden with trees, sunflowers, flowers, grass and other types of plants.
- Vinny deMacedo – Massachusetts State Representative & State Senator was born in Brava.
- David Soares – District Attorney, Albany County, New York, USA
