= Monte Fontainhas =

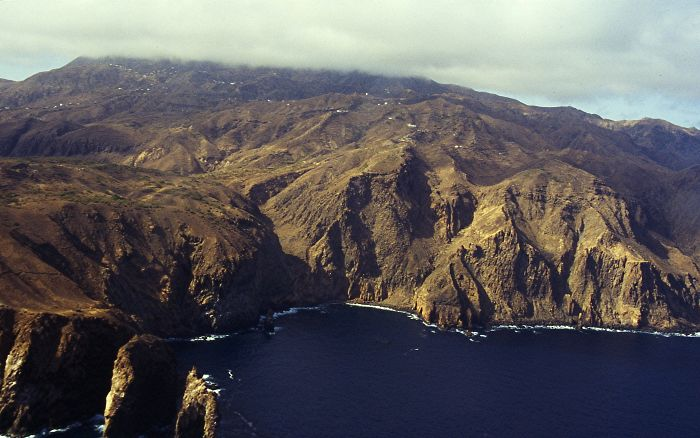
- View of the summit with clouds from the north rocky coast.

Highest point
- Elevation: 976 m (3,202 ft)
- Prominence: 976 m (3,202 ft)
- Listing: List of mountains in Cape Verde
- Coordinates: 14°51′05″N 24°42′17″W

Geography
- Location within Cape Verde
- Location: central Brava

Geology
- Mountain type: Stratovolcano

Monte Fontainhas is a volcanic mountain in the middle of Brava island in Cape Verde. At 976 m elevation, it is the highest point of the island. Rock types are made up of phonolite and ignimbrite. The mountainous centre of the island is often covered with clouds, which feed numerous springs, as was already observed by the 19th century traveller Armand d'Avezac.

== See also ==
- List of mountains in Cape Verde
