= Nova Sintra =

- Settlement
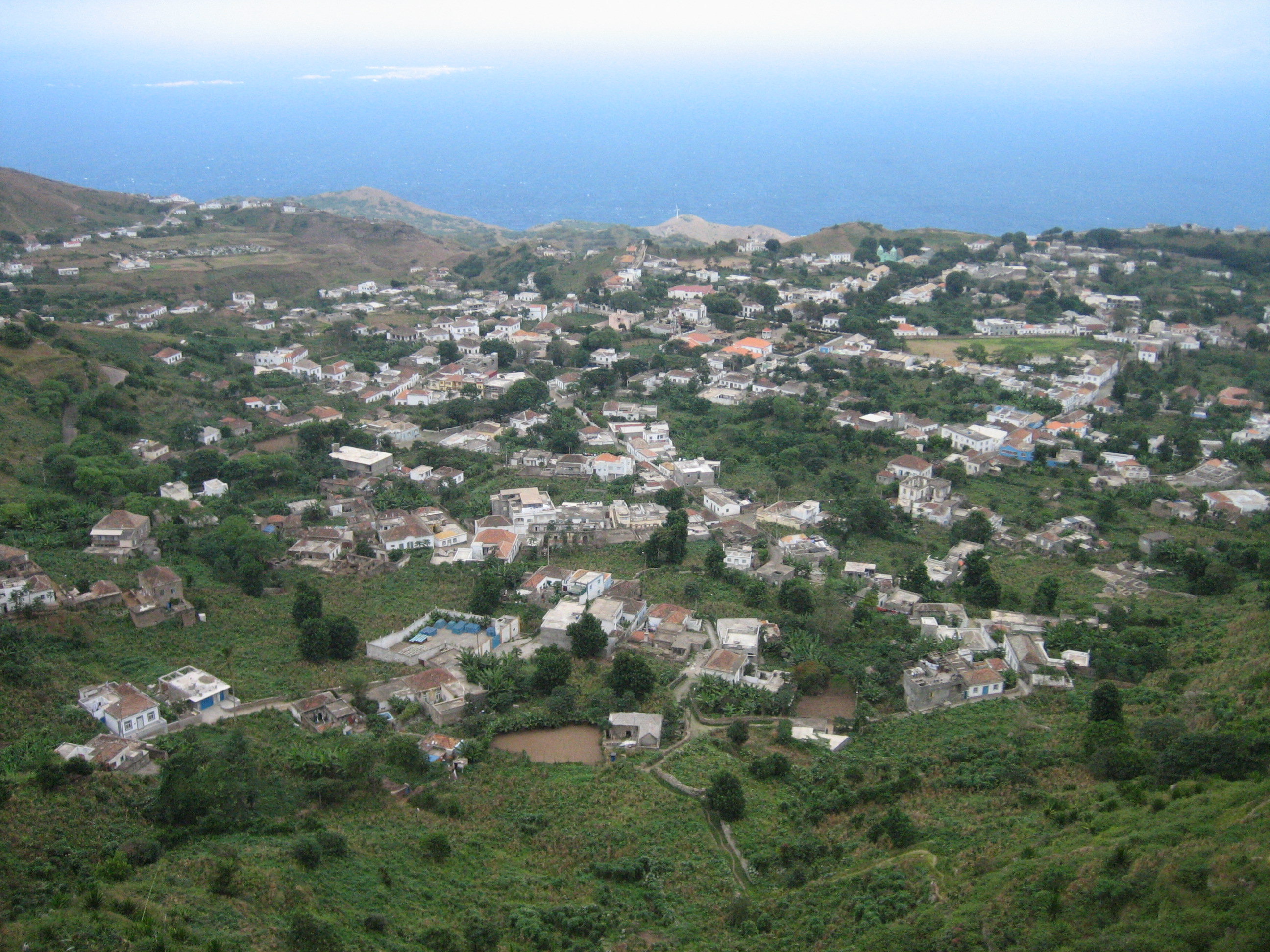
- View of Nova Sintra

- Location within Cape Verde
- Coordinates: 14.871°N 24.696°W
- Country: Cape Verde
- Island: Brava
- Municipality: Brava
- Civil parish: São João Baptista
- Elevation: 520 m (1,710 ft)

Population (2010)
  - Total: 1,536
- Postal code: 9110
- ID: 91107

Nova Sintra is a city in the central part of the island of Brava in southwestern Cape Verde. It serves as the seat of the Brava Municipality. The settlement is named after Sintra, the summer residence of the Portuguese kings. Its population is about 1,500. Its elevation is around 500 meters. Since 2010, Nova Sintra has been a city. Agriculture is the predominant source of income on Brava. Tourism is less developed, but there are a few small hotels and guest houses. The "aluguer" buses to the other villages start from Praça Eugénio Tavares.

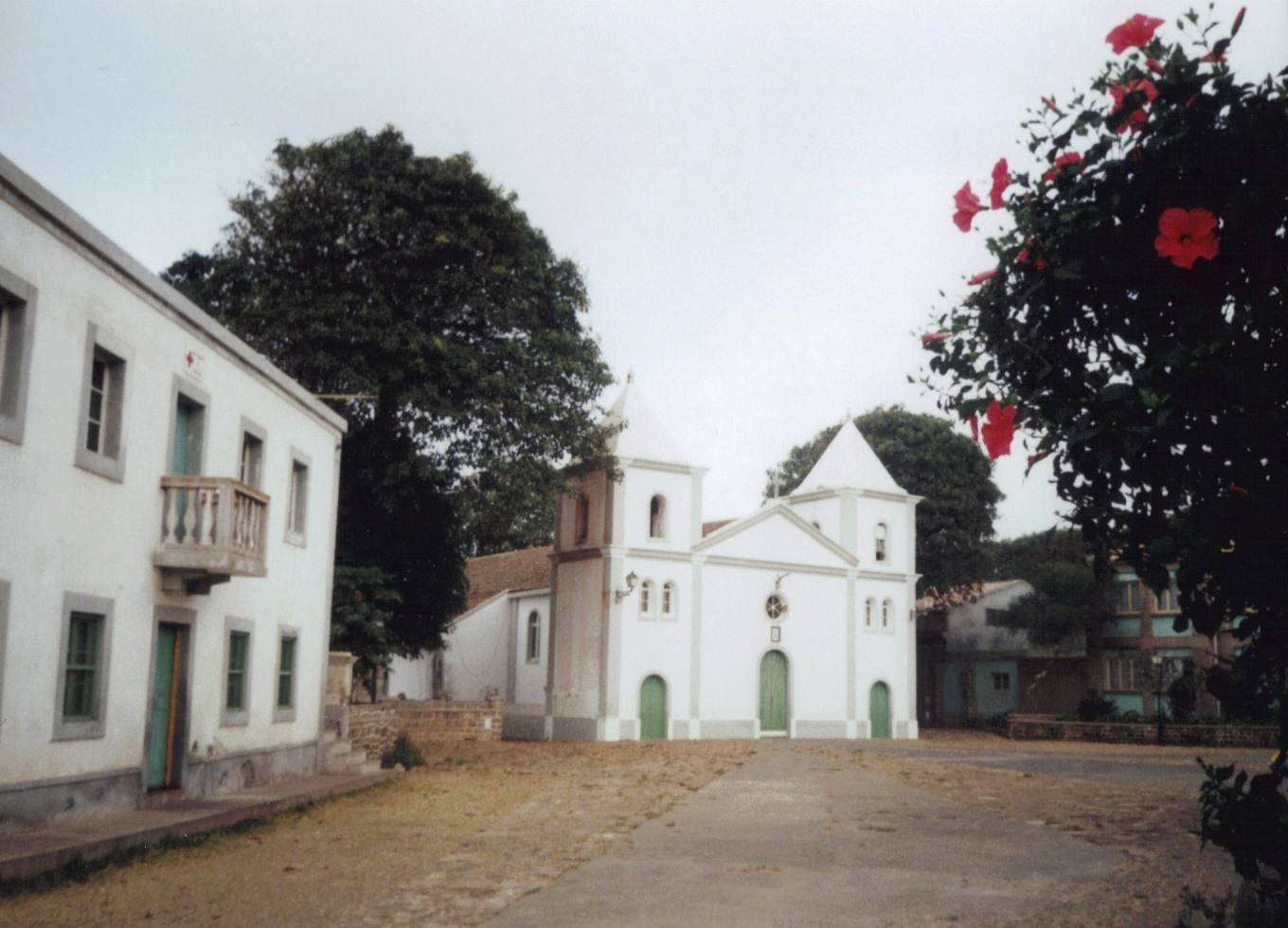
Catholic Church

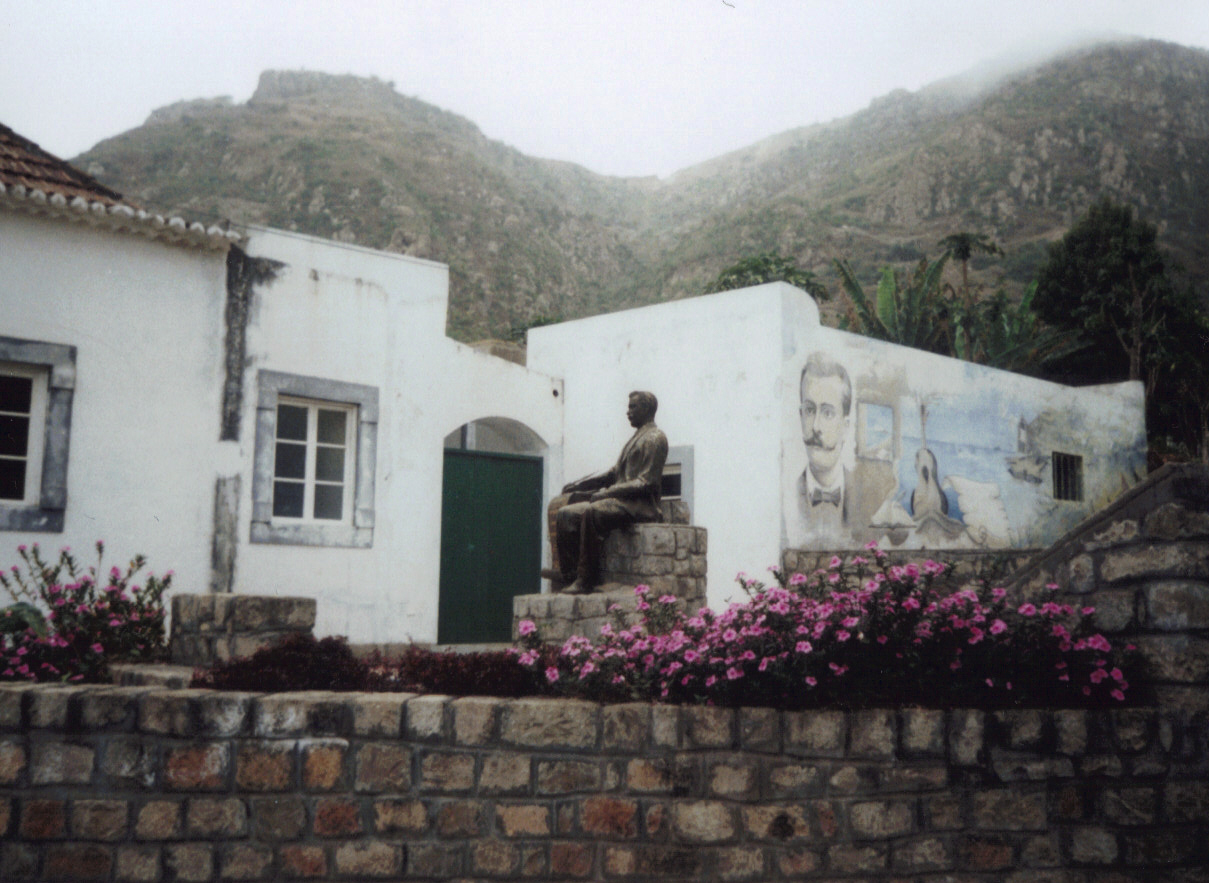
Monument of Eugénio Tavares.

The historic center has been submitted to the tentative list of UNESCO's World Heritage Sites in 2016.

== Geography ==
Nearby places include the port of Furna to the northeast, Santa Bárbara and Vinagre to the east, João da Noly to the south and Nossa Senhora do Monte to the southwest.

== Sights ==
- Nova Sintra's claim to popular fame comes from Eugénio Tavares, a famous Cape Verdean writer. There is a monument of him beside the house where he lived, which is museum today.
- The square Praça Eugénio Tavares is the center of town. There is a well-kept park, a music pavilion, a post office, a bank, a pharmacy and the City Hall. The Protestant church Igreja do Nazareno is the oldest church of the island. Opposite the bank one of the rare dragon trees (Dracaena draco) can be seen.
- The Catholic Church of Saint John the Baptist (São João Baptista) was built around 1880.
- There is also a New Apostolic Church, an Adventist Church, a Kingdom Hall of Jehovah's Witnesses and a branch of The Church of Jesus Christ of Latter-day Saints in Nova Sintra.
- Rua da Cultura is a historic street in the center of the town. Well-preserved colonial architecture can be seen here.
- In the Eastern part of the town there is a monument and viewpoint shaped like a ship. The name "Santa Maria" which is painted on the ship refers to the ship of Christopher Columbus. From here there is a beautiful view over the village of Santa Bárbara to the East coast of Brava and the harbour of Furna. There are similar monuments in other villages as well, e.g. in Campo Baixo in the South of Brava.

== Historical population ==
Year	Population
1990 (Census)	1,890
2000 (Census)	1,930
2010 (Census)	1,536

== Climate ==
Nova Sintra has a hot semi-arid climate (Köppen BSh) and is cooler than the low-lying areas of the island. Its average rainfall is 418 millimetres (16.5 in), and its average temperature is 20.3 °C (68.5 °F). The coldest month is February with an average of 18.0 °C (64.4 °F) and the warmest is September with an average of 22.4 °C (72.3 °F).

Climate data for Nova Sintra, Cape Verde (1941-1946) (Note: Calculated from monthly averages)
Month	Jan	Feb	Mar	Apr	May	Jun	Jul	Aug	Sep	Oct	Nov	Dec	Year
Record high °C (°F)	27.0 (80.6)	28.7 (83.7)	28.1 (82.6)	29.0 (84.2)	30.2 (86.4)	27.5 (81.5)	26.2 (79.2)	26.6 (79.9)	29.8 (85.6)	29.0 (84.2)	29.4 (84.9)	27.0 (80.6)	30.2 (86.4)
Mean daily maximum °C (°F)	20.4 (68.7)	19.9 (67.8)	21.2 (70.2)	21.9 (71.4)	22.0 (71.6)	22.0 (71.6)	22.9 (73.2)	23.3 (73.9)	23.9 (75.0)	23.7 (74.7)	22.3 (72.1)	21.0 (69.8)	22.0 (71.7)
Daily mean °C (°F)	18.5 (65.3)	18.0 (64.4)	18.9 (66.0)	19.8 (67.6)	20.2 (68.4)	20.5 (68.9)	21.4 (70.5)	21.9 (71.4)	22.4 (72.3)	22.2 (72.0)	20.8 (69.4)	19.4 (66.9)	20.3 (68.6)
Mean daily minimum °C (°F)	16.7 (62.1)	16.0 (60.8)	16.5 (61.7)	17.7 (63.9)	18.5 (65.3)	19.0 (66.2)	19.9 (67.8)	20.6 (69.1)	20.9 (69.6)	20.7 (69.3)	19.3 (66.7)	17.8 (64.0)	18.6 (65.5)
Record low °C (°F)	14.2 (57.6)	13.5 (56.3)	12.3 (54.1)	15.7 (60.3)	15.0 (59.0)	17.0 (62.6)	18.2 (64.8)	18.7 (65.7)	18.0 (64.4)	17.5 (63.5)	16.0 (60.8)	15.7 (60.3)	12.3 (54.1)
Average rainfall mm (inches)	1.4 (0.06)	1.0 (0.04)	0.0 (0.0)	0.0 (0.0)	0.0 (0.0)	0.7 (0.03)	15.6 (0.61)	125.1 (4.93)	152.0 (5.98)	44.5 (1.75)	67.3 (2.65)	10.5 (0.41)	418.1 (16.46)
Average rainy days	0.4	0.2	0.0	0.0	0.0	0.2	3.2	10.7	9.2	2.6	2.6	1.2	30.2
Source: NOAA

== International relations ==
Nova Sintra is twinned with:

- Sintra, Portugal
