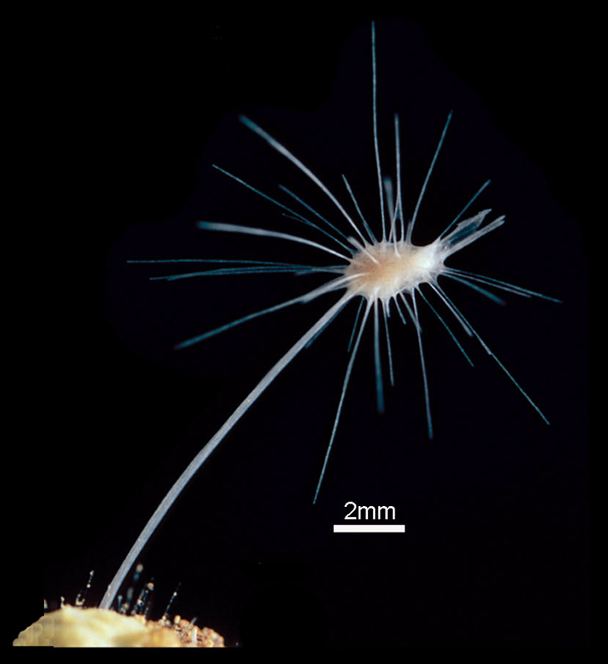

Scientific classification
- Kingdom: Animalia
- Phylum: Porifera
- Class: Demospongiae
- Order: Poecilosclerida
- Family: Cladorhizidae
- Genus: Lycopodina
- Species: L. hypogea

Binomial name
- Lycopodina hypogea (Vacelet & Boury-Esnault, 1996)

Synonyms
- Asbestopluma (Asbestopluma) hypogea Vacelet & Boury-Esnault, 1996; Asbestopluma hypogea Vacelet & Boury-Esnault, 1996

= Lycopodina hypogea =

Species of sponge

Lycopodina hypogea is a species of carnivorous sponge inhabiting the Atlantic Ocean, including the Mediterranean Sea.

== Description ==
The original description considered it closest to Asbestopluma hydra; Lycopodina was originally a species group within Asbestopluma, and was subsequently elevated to genus level.

L. hypogea is a stipitate sponge, possessing a stalk which is fixed onto the substrate by an enlarged, unbranched base; its egg-shaped (ovoid) body is distinct from the stalk. Individuals possess 30-60 lateral filaments protruding from their body which are covered in hook-like spicules. Their stalk is 3.7 to 14 mm (0.15 to 0.55 in) long and 0.1 to 0.18 mm (0.0039 to 0.0071 in) in diameter. Their tissues are composed of a matrix of megascleres and microscleres embedded in spongin; their anatomy consists of low-density tissues, collagen fibrils, symbiotic bacteria, and various cell-types, including undifferentiated cells. Choanocyte chamber and canals are absent in this species, which is also seen in other cladorhizids.

== Distribution ==
The sponge was first described from a population inhabiting a marine cave near La Ciotat, France; the holotype and paratypes are deposited in the National Museum of Natural History, France. This population grows directly on stone, being "abundant at the base of the cave walls near the mud floor", but also on "small pieces of rock partially embedded in the mud floor". These grow at depths of 17 to 22 m (56 to 72 ft) and with a temperature range of 13 to 14.7 °C (55.4 to 58.5 °F); sponge aggregations become sparser the deeper into the cave, and the densest aggregations occur in regions with sufficient ambient light to not require artificial light.

New populations were subsequently found in the Atlantic Ocean, with a depth range of 5 to 50 m (16 to 164 ft). Individuals were found to grow near mud volcanoes, but also on marine plastic debris in the Mediterranean.

== Biology ==
The filaments of sponges that have not fed for several weeks may elongate slightly. The species uses its anisochelae microscleres to capture prey, likely aided by their cytoplasmic lining. Prey items are digested outside of cells using digestive enzymes, autolysis, and bacterial action after it is covered by pinacocytes. Further digestion is done by archaeocytes and bacteriocytes. Large prey such as mysids, pycnogonids, ophiuroids, or phyllodocid worms (no larger than 8 mm (0.31 in) long) is estimated to require 8 to 10 days of digestion and recovery, though the main prey appears to consist of smaller microcrustaceans such as copepods, isopods, and ostracods. Other prey items which were experimentally offered, such as microbes, Polycladida, or young fish were not captured. Undigestible parts are excreted after 3 to 5 days. During digestion, the sponge reorganizes its body, with the degree of reorganization determinant on the size of the prey; this reorganization relies on a "highly dynamic cellular turnover", which implies a coordinated sequence of cell-death (apoptosis). Cell renewal and stem-cell proliferation seems to occur at the base of the sponge's peduncle (stalk).

Sperm cells are released from the filaments.

== Relation to humans ==
This species may be cultivated in aquaria; it is "easily" kept in captivity, though care is required to prevent excessive turbulence that may entangle the sponge's filaments. With infrequent feeding using Artemia and Hemimysis, Lycopodina hypogea may live and reproduce for several years in aquaria. L. hypogea has been suggested to be an ideal model organism for investigating cell proliferation, homeostasis, and apoptosis in adult cells. The species' genome and mitogenome has been studied.
