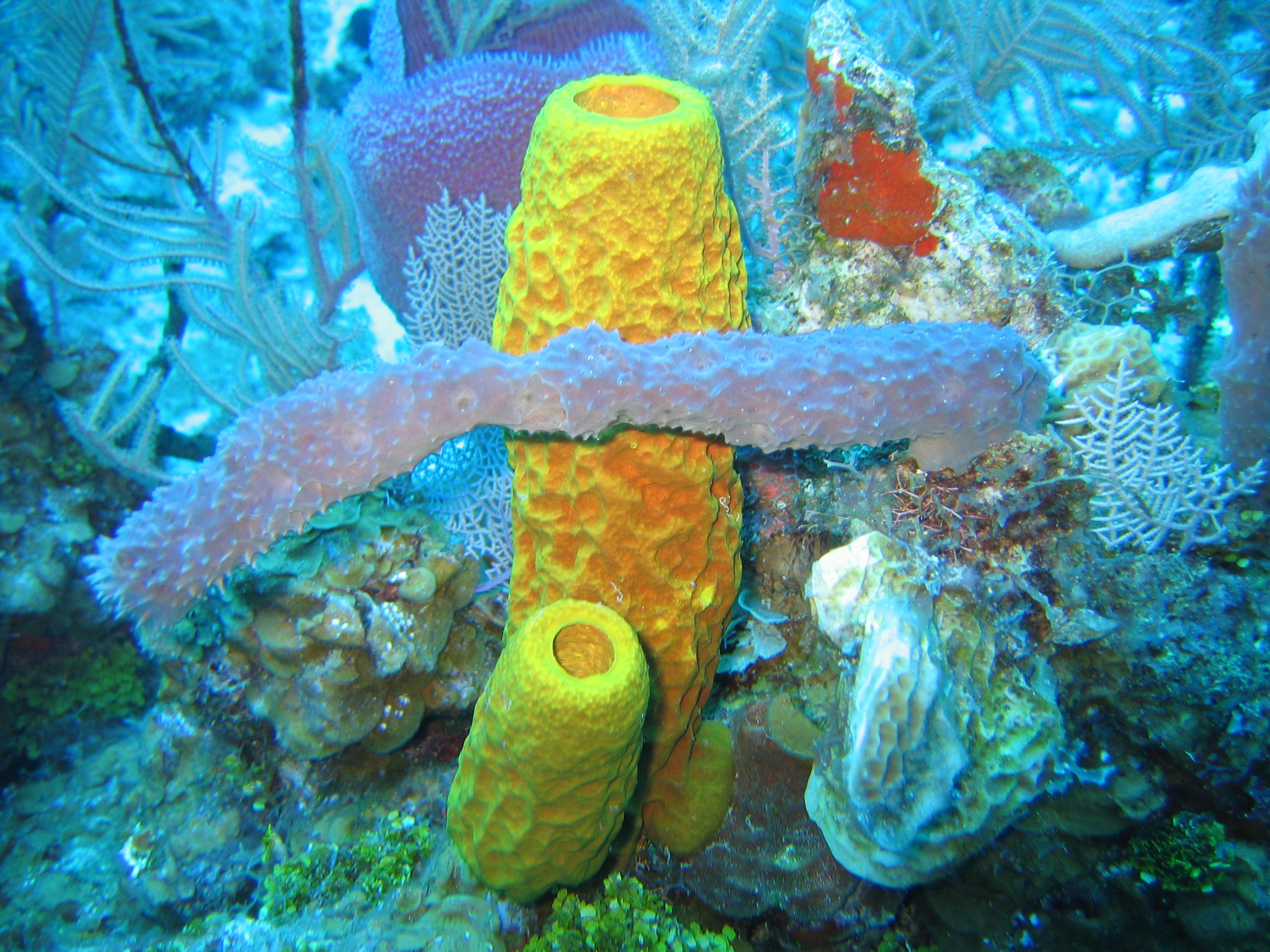
- Included are the yellow tube sponge, Aplysina fistularis, the purple vase sponge, Niphates digitalis, the red encrusting sponge, Spirastrella coccinea, and the gray rope sponge, Callyspongia sp.

Scientific classification
- Kingdom: Animalia
- Phylum: Porifera; Grant, 1836

Classes
- Calcarea; Demospongiae; Hexactinellida; Homoscleromorpha; †Archaeocyatha; †"Heteractinida" (paraphyletic); †Stromatoporoidea; †Cribricyatha; †Olgunidae (family); †Eocyathispongia; †Otavia?

Synonyms
- Parazoa/Ahistozoa (sans Placozoa)

= Sponge =

Sponges Temporal range: Ediacaran-present; probable Cryogenian record, 544 –0 Ma

Animals of the phylum Porifera

Sponges or sea sponges are primarily marine invertebrates of the animal phylum Porifera (/pəˈrɪfərəˌ pɔː-/; meaning 'pore bearer'). They are filter feeders that are typically bound to the seabed, being sessile. Sponges are one of the most ancient members of living seabed community (macrobenthos), with many species being important reef-builders. Some sponge species inhabit freshwater.

Sponges are multicellular organisms consisting of jelly-like mesohyl sandwiched between two thin layers of cells, and usually have tube-like bodies full of pores and channels that allow water to circulate through them. They have unspecialized cells that can transform into other types and that often migrate between the main cell layers and the mesohyl in the process. They do not have complex nervous, digestive or circulatory systems. Instead, most sponges rely on maintaining a constant water flow through their bodies to obtain food and oxygen and to remove waste products, usually via flagellar movements of the so-called "collar cells".

Sponges may be the sister group to all other animals, although the evidence for this relationship remains inconclusive, and different studies may recover different placements between sponges and other animal clades. Fossil evidence of primitive sponges such as Otavia dates to as early as the Tonian period (around 800 Mya). The branch of zoology that studies sponges is spongiology. Historically, the skeletons of sea sponges were used as the cleaning tool of the same name, though this is no longer a common practice.

== Etymology ==
The term sponge derives from the Ancient Greek word σπόγγος spóngos. The scientific name Porifera is a neuter plural of the Modern Latin term porifer, which comes from the roots porus meaning "pore, opening", and -fer meaning "bearing or carrying".

== Overview ==
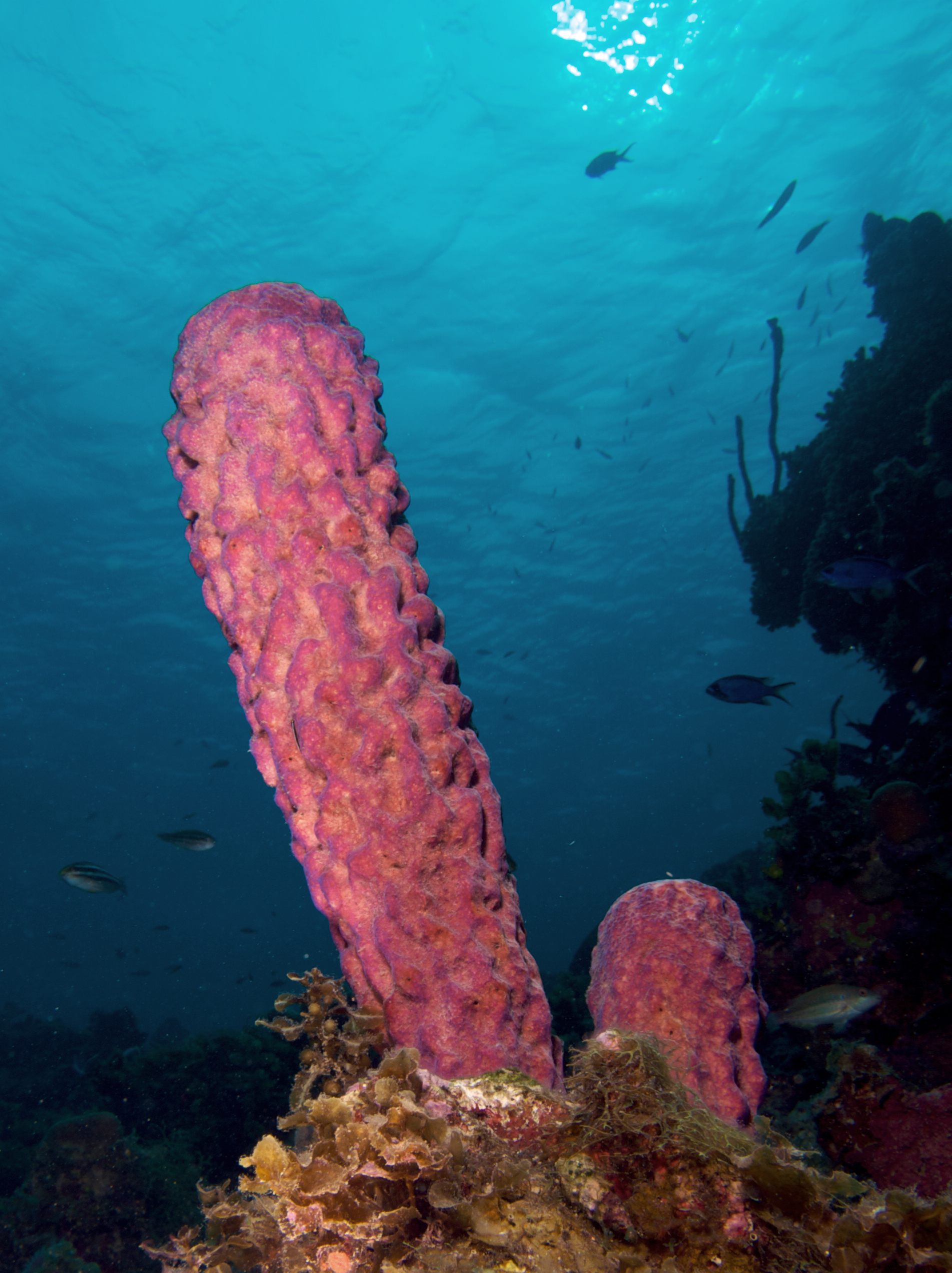
A stove-pipe sponge

Sponges are similar to other animals in that they are multicellular heterotrophs that lack cell walls and produce sperm cells. Unlike other animals, they lack true tissues and organs. Some of them are radially symmetrical, but most are asymmetrical. The shapes of their bodies are adapted for maximal efficiency of water flow through the central cavity, where the water deposits nutrients and then leaves through a hole called the osculum. Their choanocyte cells are used to drive their water flow systems and capture most of their food. This, along with phylogenetic studies of ribosomal molecules, has been used as morphological evidence to suggest sponges are the sister group to the rest of animals. A great majority are marine (salt-water) species, ranging in habitat from tidal zones to depths exceeding 8,800 m (5.5 mi), though the freshwater sponges inhabit all continents other than Antarctica. All adult sponges are sessile, meaning that they attach to an underwater surface and remain fixed in place (i.e., do not travel). While in their larval stage of life, they are motile.

Many sponges have a mesh-like endoskeleton composed of spicules made of either calcium carbonate or silicon dioxide (silica), embedded within spongin (a modified type of collagen). An internal gelatinous matrix called mesohyl functions as a binder, and it is the only skeleton in soft sponges that encrust such hard surfaces as rocks. More commonly, the mesohyl is stiffened by mineralized spicules, by spongin fibers, or both. The vast majority of extant sponges (over 90% of all known species) are demosponges, which have the widest range of habitats (including all freshwater ones); they use spongin, silica spicules, or both, and some species have calcium carbonate exoskeletons. Calcareous sponges (calcereans) have calcium carbonate spicules typically in high-magnesium forms of calcite or aragonite, and additional calcium carbonate exoskeletons in some species; they are restricted to relatively shallow marine waters where production of calcium carbonate is easiest. The fragile hexactinellids or glass sponges use "scaffolding" of silica spicules and are restricted to polar regions or ocean depths where predators are rare. Fossils of all of these types have been found in rocks dated from 580 million years ago. In addition, Archaeocyathids, whose fossils are common in rocks from 530 to 490 million years ago, are now regarded as a type of sponge. The smallest class of extant sponges are homoscleromorphs, which either have calcium carbonate spicules like the calcereans or are aspiculate, and found in shaded marine environments, like caves and overhangs.

Although most of the approximately 5,000–10,000 known species of sponges feed on planktonic bacteria and other microscopic organic particles suspended in water, some become mixotrophic by hosting symbiotic photosynthetic microorganisms such as cyanobacteria and algae (zooxanthella) within the mesohyl, and these endosymbionts often produce more food and oxygen than they can consume themselves. A few species of sponges that live in food-poor environments have evolved as predatory carnivores that use fishhook-like spicules to snag benthic animals, mainly small crustaceans.

Most sponges reproduce sexually, but they can also reproduce asexually. Sexually reproducing species release sperm cells into the water to fertilize ova released or retained by its mate or "mother"; the fertilized eggs develop into larvae which swim off in search of places to settle. Sponges are known for regenerating from fragments that are broken off, although this only works if the fragments include the right types of cells. Some species reproduce by budding. When environmental conditions become less hospitable to the sponges, for example as temperatures drop, many freshwater species and a few marine ones produce gemmules, "survival pods" of unspecialized cells that remain dormant until conditions improve; they then either form completely new sponges or recolonize the skeletons of their parents.

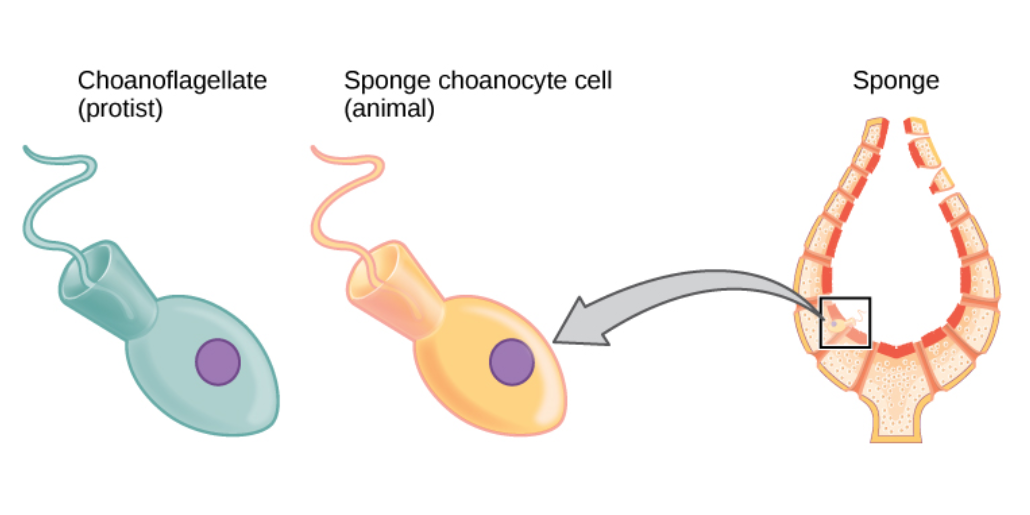
Cells of the protist choanoflagellate clade closely resemble sponge choanocyte cells. Beating of choanocyte flagella draws water through the sponge so that nutrients can be extracted and waste removed.

The few species of demosponge that have entirely soft fibrous skeletons with no hard elements have been used by humans over thousands of years for several purposes, including as padding and as cleaning tools. By the 1950s, though, these had been overfished so heavily that the industry almost collapsed, and most sponge-like materials are now synthetic. Sponges and their microscopic endosymbionts are now being researched as possible sources of medicines for treating a wide range of diseases. Dolphins have been observed using sponges as tools while foraging.

== Distinguishing features ==
Sponges constitute the phylum Porifera, and have been defined as sessile metazoans (multicelled immobile animals) that have water intake and outlet openings connected by chambers lined with choanocytes, cells with whip-like flagella. However, a few carnivorous sponges have lost these water flow systems and the choanocytes. All known living sponges can remold their bodies, as most types of their cells can move within their bodies and a few can change from one type to another.

Even if a few sponges are able to produce mucus – which acts as a microbial barrier in all other animals – no sponge with the ability to secrete a functional mucus layer has been recorded. Without such a mucus layer, their living tissue is covered by a layer of microbial symbionts, which can contribute up to 40–50% of the sponge wet mass. This inability to prevent microbes from penetrating their porous tissue could be a major reason why they have never evolved a more complex anatomy.

Like cnidarians (jellyfish, etc.) and ctenophores (comb jellies), and unlike all other known metazoans, sponges' bodies consist of a non-living jelly-like mass (mesohyl) sandwiched between two main layers of cells. Cnidarians and ctenophores have simple nervous systems, and their cell layers are bound by internal connections and by being mounted on a basement membrane, a thin fibrous mat, also known as a basal lamina. Sponges do not have a nervous system similar to that of vertebrates but may have one that is quite different. Their middle jelly-like layers have large and varied populations of cells, and some types of cells in their outer layers may move into the middle layer and change their functions.

	Sponges	Cnidarians and ctenophores
Nervous system	No/Yes	Yes, simple
Cells in each layer bound together	No, except that Homoscleromorpha have basement membranes.	Yes: inter-cell connections; basement membranes
Number of cells in middle "jelly" layer	Many	Few
Cells in outer layers can move inwards and change functions	Yes	No

== Basic structure ==
=== Cell types ===
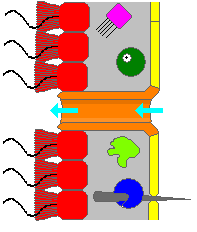
Main cell types of Porifera

A sponge's body is hollow and is held in shape by the mesohyl, a jelly-like substance made mainly of collagen and reinforced by a dense network of fibers also made of collagen. 18 distinct cell types have been identified. The inner surface is covered with choanocytes, cells with cylindrical or conical collars surrounding one flagellum per choanocyte. The wave-like motion of the whip-like flagella drives water through the sponge's body. All sponges have ostia, channels leading to the interior through the mesohyl. In most sponges, these are controlled by tube-like porocytes that form closable inlet valves. Pinacocytes, plate-like cells, form a single-layered external skin over all other parts of the mesohyl that are not covered by choanocytes, and the pinacocytes also digest food particles that are too large to enter the ostia, while those at the base of the animal are responsible for anchoring it.

Other types of cells live and move within the mesohyl:

- Lophocytes are amoeba-like cells that move slowly through the mesohyl and secrete collagen fibres.
- Collencytes are another type of collagen-producing cell.
- Rhabdiferous cells secrete polysaccharides that also form part of the mesohyl.
- Oocytes and spermatocytes are reproductive cells.
- Sclerocytes secrete the mineralized spicules ("little spines") that form the skeletons of many sponges and in some species provide some defense against predators.
- In addition to or instead of sclerocytes, demosponges have spongocytes that secrete a form of collagen that polymerizes into spongin, a thick fibrous material that stiffens the mesohyl.
- Myocytes ("muscle cells") conduct signals and cause parts of the animal to contract.
- "Grey cells" act as sponges' equivalent of an immune system.
- Archaeocytes (or amoebocytes) are amoeba-like cells that are totipotent, in other words, each is capable of transformation into any other type of cell. They also have important roles in feeding and in clearing debris that block the ostia.

Many larval sponges possess neuron-less eyes that are based on cryptochromes. They mediate phototaxic behavior.

Glass sponges present a distinctive variation on this basic plan. Their spicules, which are made of silica, form a scaffolding-like framework between whose rods the living tissue is suspended like a cobweb that contains most of the cell types. This tissue is a syncytium that in some ways behaves like many cells that share a single external membrane, and in others like a single cell with multiple nuclei.

=== Water flow and body structures ===
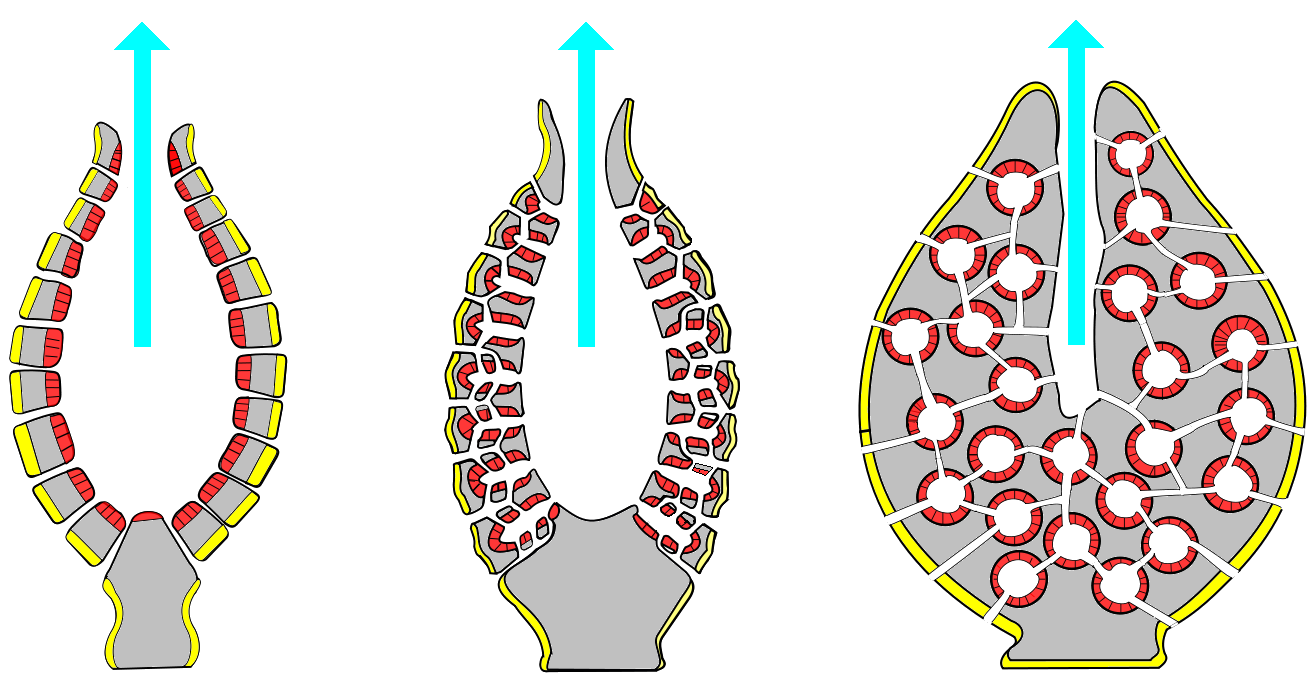
Porifera body structures

Most sponges work rather like chimneys: they take in water at the bottom and eject it from the osculum at the top. Since ambient currents are faster at the top, the suction effect that they produce by Bernoulli's principle does some of the work for free. Sponges can control the water flow by various combinations of wholly or partially closing the osculum and ostia (the intake pores) and varying the beat of the flagella, and may shut it down if there is a lot of sand or silt in the water.

Although the layers of pinacocytes and choanocytes resemble the epithelia of more complex animals, they are not bound tightly by cell-to-cell connections or a basal lamina (thin fibrous sheet underneath). The flexibility of these layers and re-modeling of the mesohyl by lophocytes allow the animals to adjust their shapes throughout their lives to take maximum advantage of local water currents.

The simplest body structure in sponges is a tube or vase shape known as "asconoid", but this severely limits the size of the animal. The body structure is characterized by a stalk-like spongocoel surrounded by a single layer of choanocytes. If it is simply scaled up, the ratio of its volume to surface area increases, because surface increases as the square of length or width while volume increases proportionally to the cube. The amount of tissue that needs food and oxygen is determined by the volume, but the pumping capacity that supplies food and oxygen depends on the area covered by choanocytes. Asconoid sponges seldom exceed 1 mm (0.039 in) in diameter.

Diagram of a syconoid sponge

Some sponges overcome this limitation by adopting the "syconoid" structure, in which the body wall is pleated. The inner pockets of the pleats are lined with choanocytes, which connect to the outer pockets of the pleats by ostia. This increase in the number of choanocytes and hence in pumping capacity enables syconoid sponges to grow up to a few centimeters in diameter.

The "leuconoid" pattern boosts pumping capacity further by filling the interior almost completely with mesohyl that contains a network of chambers lined with choanocytes and connected to each other and to the water intakes and outlet by tubes. Leuconid sponges grow to over 1 m (3.3 ft) in diameter, and the fact that growth in any direction increases the number of choanocyte chambers enables them to take a wider range of forms, for example, "encrusting" sponges whose shapes follow those of the surfaces to which they attach. All freshwater and most shallow-water marine sponges have leuconid bodies. The networks of water passages in glass sponges are similar to the leuconid structure.

In all three types of structure, the cross-section area of the choanocyte-lined regions is much greater than that of the intake and outlet channels. This makes the flow slower near the choanocytes and thus makes it easier for them to trap food particles. For example, in Leuconia, a small leuconoid sponge about 10 centimetres (3.9 in) tall and 1 centimetre (0.39 in) in diameter, water enters each of more than 80,000 intake canals at 6 cm per minute. However, because Leuconia has more than 2 million flagellated chambers whose combined diameter is much greater than that of the canals, water flow through chambers slows to 3.6 cm per hour, making it easy for choanocytes to capture food. All the water is expelled through a single osculum at about 8.5 cm per second, fast enough to carry waste products some distance away.

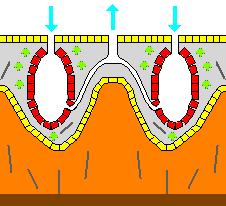
Sponge with calcium carbonate skeleton.: Pinacocyte; Choanocyte; Archeocytes and other cells in mesohyl; Mesohyl; Spicules; Calcium carbonate; Seabed / rock; Water flow

=== Skeleton ===
In zoology, a skeleton is any fairly rigid structure of an animal, irrespective of whether it has joints and irrespective of whether it is biomineralized. The mesohyl functions as an endoskeleton in most sponges, and is the only skeleton in soft sponges that encrust hard surfaces such as rocks. More commonly, the mesohyl is stiffened by mineral spicules, by spongin fibers or both. Spicules, which are present in most but not all species, may be made of silica or calcium carbonate, and vary in shape from simple rods to three-dimensional "stars" with up to six rays. Spicules are produced by sclerocyte cells, and may be separate, connected by joints, or fused.

Some sponges also secrete exoskeletons that lie completely outside their organic components. For example, sclerosponges ("hard sponges") have massive calcium carbonate exoskeletons over which the organic matter forms a thin layer with choanocyte chambers in pits in the mineral. These exoskeletons are secreted by the pinacocytes that form the animals' skins.

== Vital functions ==
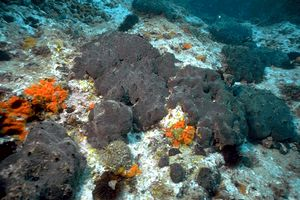
Spongia officinalis, "the kitchen sponge", is dark grey when alive.

=== Movement ===
Although adult sponges are fundamentally sessile animals, some marine and freshwater species can move across the sea bed at speeds of 1–4 mm (0.039–0.157 in) per day, as a result of amoeba-like movements of pinacocytes and other cells. A few species can contract their whole bodies, and many can close their oscula and ostia. Juveniles drift or swim freely, while adults are stationary.

=== Respiration, feeding and excretion ===
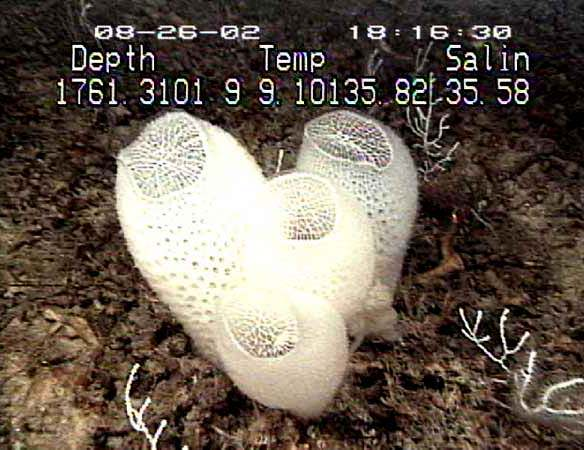
Euplectella aspergillum, a glass sponge known as "Venus's flower basket"

Sponges do not have distinct circulatory, respiratory, digestive, and excretory systems – instead, the water flow system supports all these functions. They filter food particles out of the water flowing through them. Particles larger than 50 micrometers cannot enter the ostia and pinacocytes consume them by phagocytosis (engulfing and intracellular digestion). Particles from 0.5 μm to 50 μm are trapped in the ostia, which taper from the outer to inner ends. These particles are consumed by pinacocytes or by archaeocytes that partially extrude themselves through the walls of the ostia. Bacteria-sized particles, below 0.5 micrometers, pass through the ostia and are caught and consumed by choanocytes. Since the smallest particles are by far the most common, choanocytes typically capture 80% of a sponge's food supply. Archaeocytes transport food packaged in vesicles from cells that directly digest food to those that do not. At least one species of sponge has internal fibers that function as tracks for use by nutrient-carrying archaeocytes, and these tracks also move inert objects.

It used to be claimed that glass sponges could live on nutrients dissolved in sea water and were very averse to silt. However, a study in 2007 found no evidence of this and concluded that they extract bacteria and other micro-organisms from water very efficiently (about 79%) and process suspended sediment grains to extract such prey. Collar bodies digest food and distribute it wrapped in vesicles that are transported by dynein "motor" molecules along bundles of microtubules that run throughout the syncytium.

Sponges' cells absorb oxygen by diffusion from water into cells as water flows through body, into which carbon dioxide and other soluble waste products such as ammonia also diffuse. Archeocytes remove mineral particles that threaten to block the ostia, transport them through the mesohyl and generally dump them into the outgoing water current, although some species incorporate them into their skeletons.

=== Carnivorous sponges ===
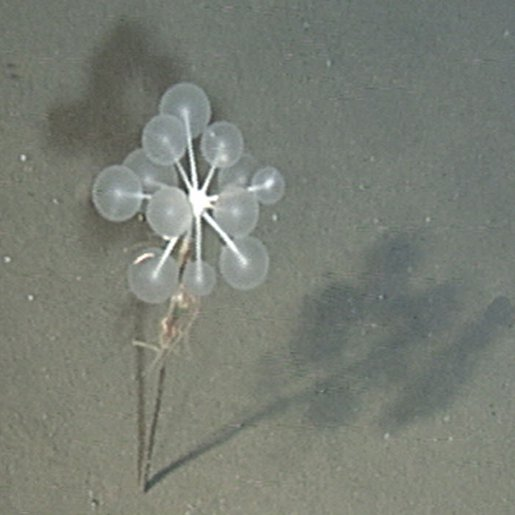
The carnivorous ping-pong tree sponge, Chondrocladia lampadiglobus

In waters where the supply of food particles is very poor, some species prey on crustaceans and other small animals. As of 2014, a total of 137 species had been discovered. Most belong to the family Cladorhizidae, but a few members of the Guitarridae and Esperiopsidae are also carnivores. In most cases, little is known about how they actually capture prey, although some species are thought to use either sticky threads or hooked spicules. Most carnivorous sponges live in deep waters, up to 8,840 m (5.49 mi), and the development of deep-ocean exploration techniques is expected to lead to the discovery of several more. However, Lycopodina hypogea has been found in relatively shallow depths of 17–23 m (56–75 ft) in Mediterranean sea caves. These cave-dwelling predators capture prey using filaments equipped with hooked spicules, and digest them by enveloping them with more threads over the course of a few days.

Most known carnivorous sponges have completely lost the water flow system and choanocytes. However, the genus Chondrocladia uses a highly modified water flow system to inflate balloon-like structures that are used for capturing prey.

=== Endosymbionts ===
Freshwater sponges often host green algae as endosymbionts within archaeocytes and other cells and benefit from nutrients produced by the algae. Many marine species host other photosynthesizing organisms, most commonly cyanobacteria but in some cases dinoflagellates. Symbiotic cyanobacteria may form a third of the total mass of living tissue in some sponges, and some sponges gain 48% to 80% of their energy supply from these micro-organisms. In 2008, a University of Stuttgart team reported that spicules made of silica conduct light into the mesohyl, where the photosynthesizing endosymbionts live. Sponges that host photosynthesizing organisms are most common in waters with relatively poor supplies of food particles and often have leafy shapes that maximize the amount of sunlight they collect.

A carnivorous sponge that lives near hydrothermal vents hosts methane-eating bacteria and digests some of them.

=== "Immune" system ===
Sponges do not have the complex immune systems of most other animals. However, they reject grafts from other species but accept them from other members of their own species. In a few marine species, gray cells play the leading role in rejection of foreign material. When invaded, they produce a chemical that stops movement of other cells in the affected area, thus preventing the intruder from using the sponge's internal transport systems. If the intrusion persists, the grey cells concentrate in the area and release toxins that kill all cells in the area. The "immune" system can stay in this activated state for up to three weeks.

=== Regeneration ===
The regenerative ability of sponges is well studied, especially in the demosponges.

The different sponge classes regenerate using distinct methods. Typically, regeneration occurs after an injury wounds or fragments the sponge, but they are able to regenerate even from dissociated cells; after being subjected to chemical or mechanical tissue destruction, these dissociated cells reaggregate to begin the process of regeneration, and after reforming the epithelium, gradually reconstruct their anatomy, such as the water circulation system. This "whole-body regeneration" has been observed in demosponges, calcareous sponges, and homoscleromorphs. Cell death appears to have a limited role in whole-body regeneration, mainly occurring while the epithelium reforms.

Glass sponges are also able to regenerate; Rhabdocalyptus dawsoni is able to regenerate at a rate of 0.02–0.08 cm^{2} (0.0031–0.0124 sq in) per day, filling in from the atrial, then dermal side, and closing up to form a scar. This rate is up to 40 times faster than growth of new tissue in the species, which may be due to the cytoplasmic method glass sponges use, as opposed to the slower cellular method in other sponges.

Regeneration is noted to be faster than normal growth, as seen in Aplysilla rosea. Additionally, regeneration at the base appears to occur faster than that occurring at the apex (top) of the sponge, at least in Cinachyrella cf. cavernosa.

=== Reproduction ===
==== Asexual ====
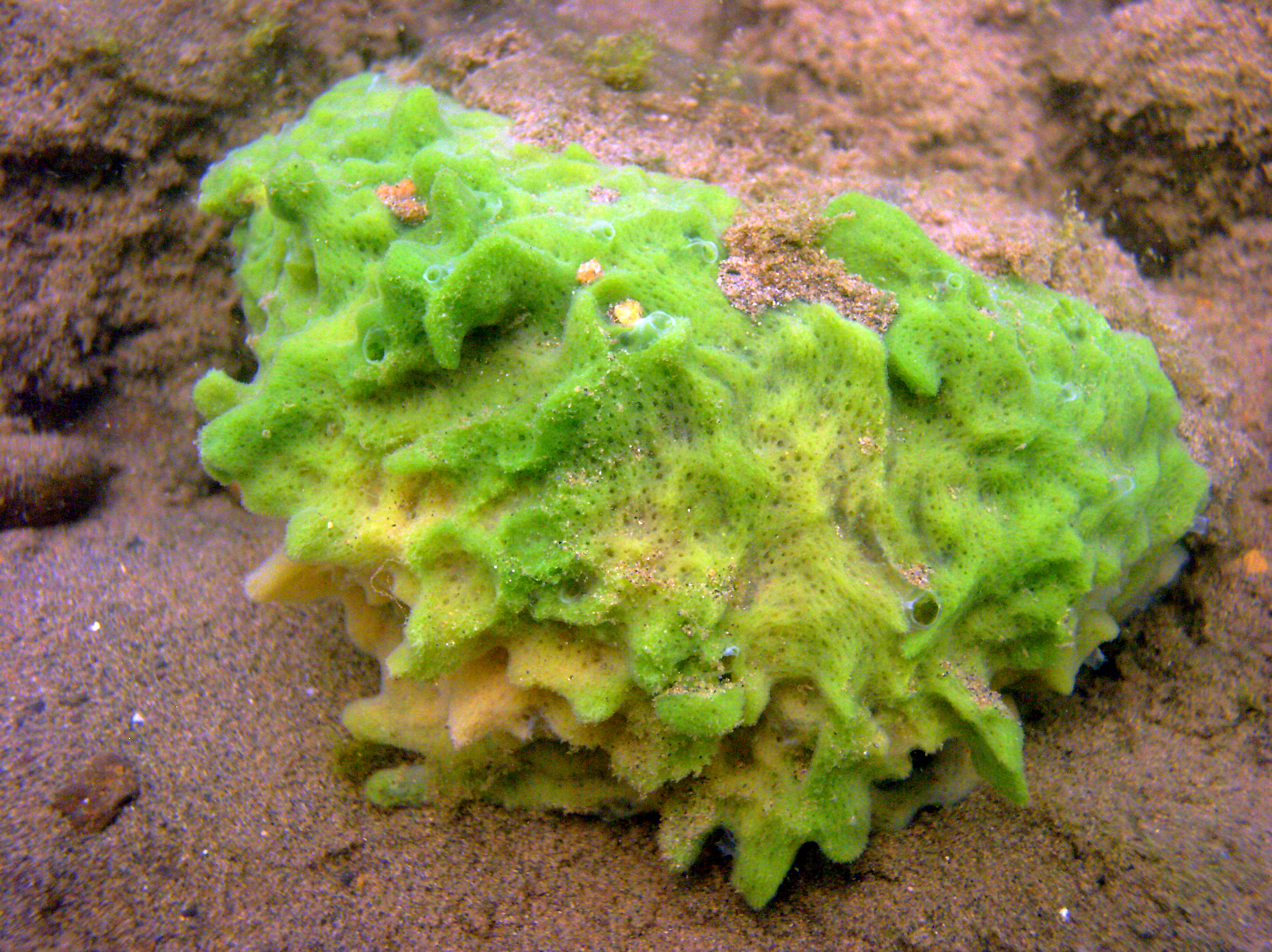
The freshwater sponge Spongilla lacustris

Sponges have three asexual methods of reproduction: after fragmentation, by budding, and by producing gemmules. Fragments of sponges may be detached by currents or waves. They use the mobility of their pinacocytes and choanocytes and reshaping of the mesohyl to re-attach themselves to a suitable surface and then rebuild themselves as small but functional sponges over the course of several days. The same capabilities enable sponges that have been squeezed through a fine cloth to regenerate. A sponge fragment can only regenerate if it contains both collencytes to produce mesohyl and archeocytes to produce all the other cell types. A very few species reproduce by budding.

Gemmules are "survival pods" that a few marine sponges and many freshwater species produce by the thousands when dying and which some, mainly freshwater species, regularly produce in autumn. Spongocytes make gemmules by wrapping shells of spongin, often reinforced with spicules, round clusters of archeocytes that are full of nutrients. Freshwater gemmules may also include photosynthesizing symbionts. The gemmules then become dormant, and in this state can survive cold, drying out, lack of oxygen and extreme variations in salinity. Freshwater gemmules often do not revive until the temperature drops, stays cold for a few months and then reaches a near-"normal" level. When a gemmule germinates, the archeocytes round the outside of the cluster transform into pinacocytes, a membrane over a pore in the shell bursts, the cluster of cells slowly emerges, and most of the remaining archeocytes transform into other cell types needed to make a functioning sponge. Gemmules from the same species but different individuals can join forces to form one sponge. Some gemmules are retained within the parent sponge, and in spring it can be difficult to tell whether an old sponge has revived or been "recolonized" by its own gemmules.

==== Sexual ====
Most sponges are hermaphrodites (function as both sexes simultaneously), although sponges have no gonads (reproductive organs). Sperm are produced by choanocytes or entire choanocyte chambers that sink into the mesohyl and form spermatic cysts, while eggs are formed by transformation of archeocytes, or of choanocytes in some species. Each egg generally acquires a yolk by consuming "nurse cells". During spawning, sperm burst out of their cysts and are expelled via the osculum. If they contact another sponge of the same species, the water flow carries them to choanocytes that engulf them but, instead of digesting them, metamorphose to an ameboid form and carry the sperm through the mesohyl to eggs, which in most cases engulf the carrier and its cargo.

A few species release fertilized eggs into the water, but most retain the eggs until they hatch. By retaining the eggs, the parents can transfer symbiotic microorganisms directly to their offspring through vertical transmission, while the species who release their eggs into the water has to acquire symbionts horizontally (a combination of both is probably most common, where larvae with vertically transmitted symbionts also acquire others horizontally). There are four types of larvae, but all are lecithotrophic (non-feeding) balls of cells with an outer layer of cells whose flagella or cilia enable the larvae to move. After swimming for a few days, the larvae sink and crawl until they find a place to settle. Most of the cells transform into archeocytes and then into the types appropriate for their locations in a miniature adult sponge.

Glass sponge embryos start by dividing into separate cells; however, once 32 cells have formed, they rapidly transform into larvae that externally are ovoid with a band of cilia round the middle that they use for movement, but internally have the typical glass sponge structure of spicules with a cobweb-like main syncitium draped around and between them and choanosyncytia with multiple collar bodies in the center. The larvae then leave their parents' bodies.

=== Meiosis ===
The cytological progression of porifera oogenesis and spermatogenesis (gametogenesis) is very similar to that of other metazoa. Most of the genes from the classic set of meiotic genes, including genes for DNA recombination and double-strand break repair, that are conserved in eukaryotes are expressed in the sponges (e.g. Geodia hentscheli and Geodia phlegraei). Since porifera are considered to be the earliest divergent animals, these findings indicate that the basic toolkit of meiosis including capabilities for recombination and DNA repair were present early in eukaryote evolution.

==== Life cycle ====
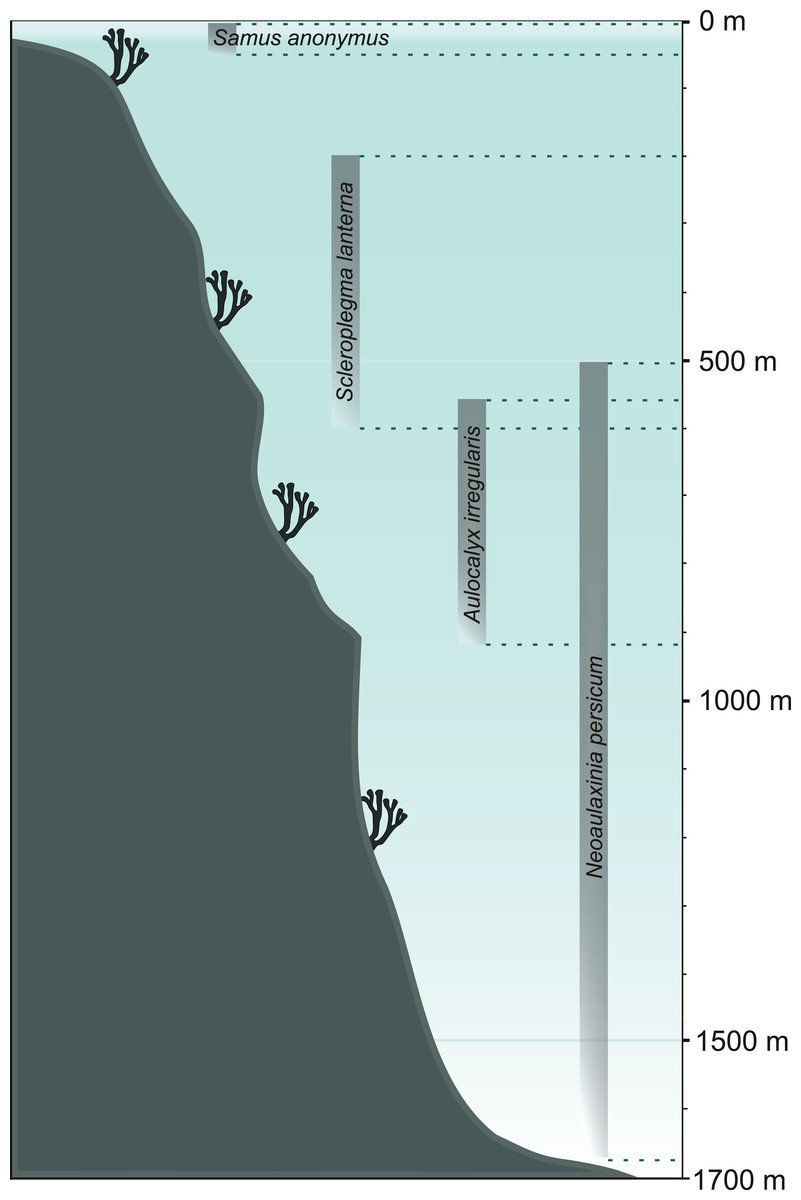
Bathymetrical range of some sponge species. Demosponge Samus anonymus (up to 50 m), hexactinellid Scleroplegma lanterna (~100–600 m), hexactinellid Aulocalyx irregularis (~550–915 m), lithistid demosponge Neoaulaxinia persicum (~500–1700 m)

Sponges in temperate regions live for at most a few years, but some tropical species and perhaps some deep-ocean ones may live for 200 years or more. Some calcified demosponges grow by only 0.2 mm (0.0079 in) per year and, if that rate is constant, specimens 1 m (3.3 ft) wide must be about 5,000 years old. Some sponges start sexual reproduction when only a few weeks old, while others wait until they are several years old.

=== Coordination of activities ===
Adult sponges lack neurons or any other kind of nervous tissue. However, most species have the ability to perform movements that are coordinated all over their bodies, mainly contractions of the pinacocytes, squeezing the water channels and thus expelling excess sediment and other substances that may cause blockages. Some species can contract the osculum independently of the rest of the body. Sponges may also contract in order to reduce the area that is vulnerable to attack by predators. In cases where two sponges are fused, for example if there is a large but still unseparated bud, these contraction waves slowly become coordinated in both of the "Siamese twins". The coordinating mechanism is unknown, but may involve chemicals similar to neurotransmitters. However, glass sponges rapidly transmit electrical impulses through all parts of the syncytium, and use this to halt the motion of their flagella if the incoming water contains toxins or excessive sediment. Myocytes are thought to be responsible for closing the osculum and for transmitting signals between different parts of the body.

Sponges contain genes very similar to those that contain the "recipe" for the post-synaptic density, an important signal-receiving structure in the neurons of all other animals. However, in sponges these genes are only activated in "flask cells" that appear only in larvae and may provide some sensory capability while the larvae are swimming. This raises questions about whether flask cells represent the predecessors of true neurons or are evidence that sponges' ancestors had true neurons but lost them as they adapted to a sessile lifestyle.

== Ecology ==
=== Habitats ===
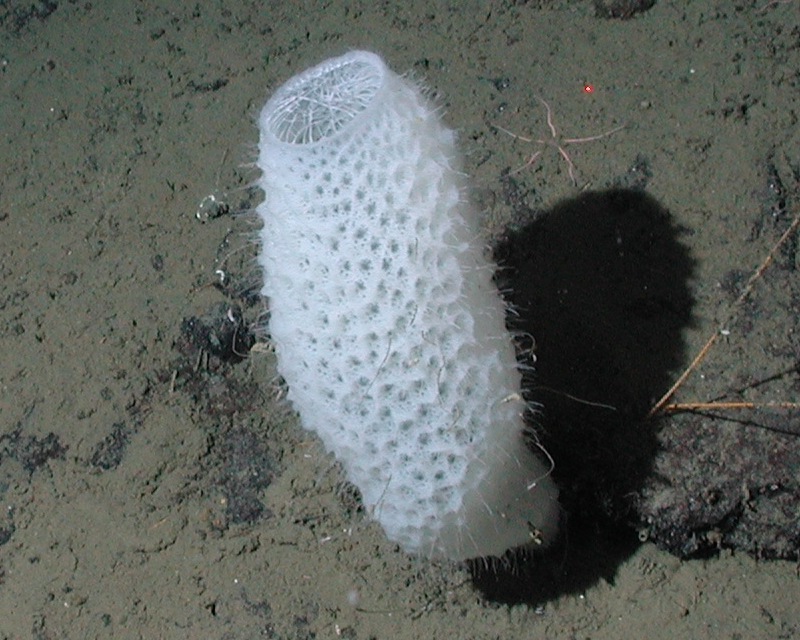
Euplectella aspergillum is a deep ocean glass sponge, seen here at a depth of 2,572 metres (8,438 ft) off the coast of California

Sponges are worldwide in their distribution, living in a wide range of ocean habitats, from the polar regions to the tropics. Most live in quiet, clear waters, because sediment stirred up by waves or currents would block their pores, making it difficult for them to feed and breathe. The greatest numbers of sponges are usually found on firm surfaces such as rocks, but some sponges can attach themselves to soft sediment by means of a root-like base.

Sponges are more abundant but less diverse in temperate waters than in tropical waters, possibly because organisms that prey on sponges are more abundant in tropical waters. Glass sponges are the most common in polar waters and in the depths of temperate and tropical seas, as their very porous construction enables them to extract food from these resource-poor waters with the minimum of effort. Demosponges and calcareous sponges are abundant and diverse in shallower non-polar waters.

The different classes of sponge live in different ranges of habitat:

Class	Water type	Depth	Type of surface
Calcarea	Marine	less than 100 m (330 ft)	Hard
Glass sponges	Marine	Deep	Soft or firm sediment
Demosponges	Marine, brackish; and about 150 freshwater species	Inter-tidal to abyssal; a carnivorous demosponge has been found at 8,840 m (5.49 mi)	Any

=== As primary producers ===
Sponges with photosynthesizing endosymbionts produce up to three times more oxygen than they consume, as well as more organic matter than they consume. Such contributions to their habitats' resources are significant along Australia's Great Barrier Reef but relatively minor in the Caribbean.

=== Defenses ===
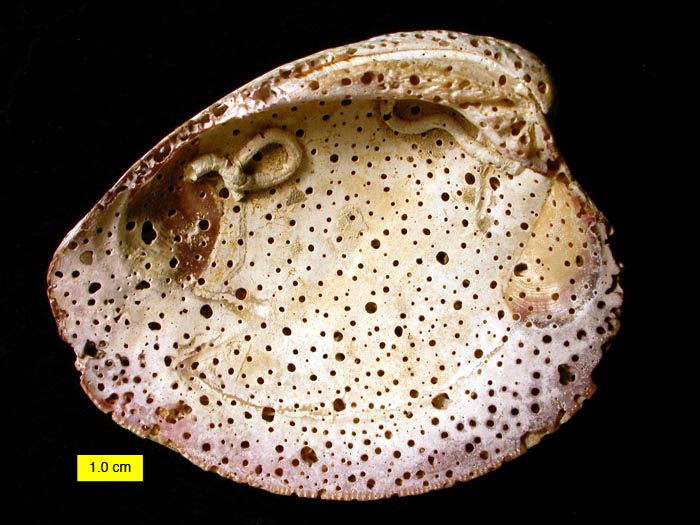
Holes made by clionaid sponge (producing the trace Entobia) after the death of a modern bivalve shell of species Mercenaria mercenaria, from North Carolina

Many sponges shed spicules, forming a dense carpet several meters deep that keeps away echinoderms which would otherwise prey on the sponges. They also produce toxins that prevent other sessile organisms such as bryozoans or sea squirts from growing on or near them, making sponges very effective competitors for living space. One of many examples includes ageliferin, which has antibacterial action and causes biofilms to dissolve.

A few species, including the Caribbean fire sponge Tedania ignis, cause a severe rash in humans who handle them. Turtles and some fish feed mainly on sponges. It is often said that sponges produce chemical defenses against such predators. However, experiments have been unable to establish a relationship between the toxicity of chemicals produced by sponges and how they taste to fish, which would diminish the usefulness of chemical defenses as deterrents. Predation by fish may even help to spread sponges by detaching fragments. However, some studies have shown fish showing a preference for non-chemically-defended sponges, and another study found that high levels of coral predation did predict the presence of chemically defended species.

Glass sponges produce no toxic chemicals, and live in very deep water where predators are rare.

=== Predation ===
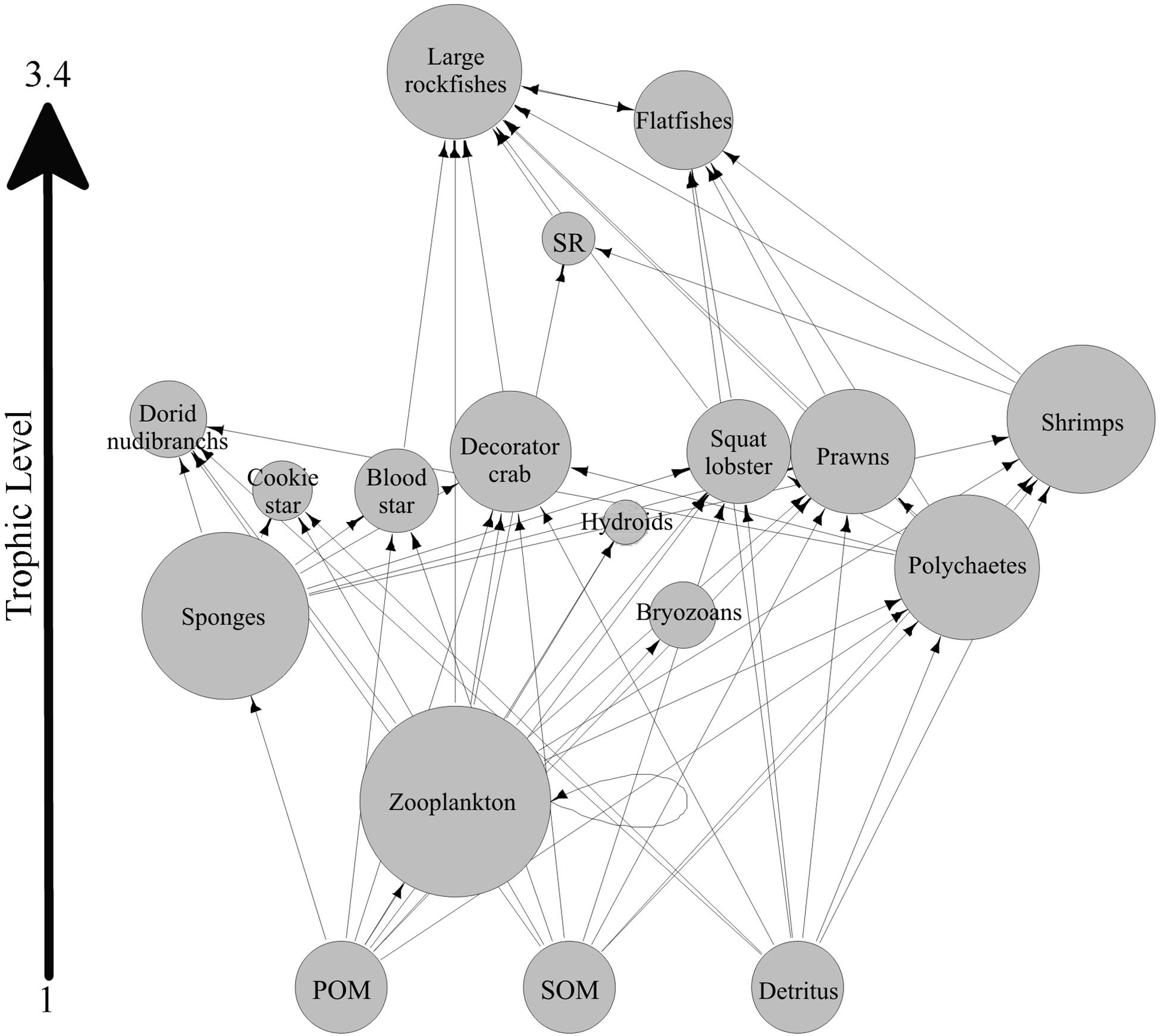
Generalised food web for sponge reefs

Spongeflies, also known as spongillaflies (Neuroptera, Sisyridae), are specialist predators of freshwater sponges. The female lays her eggs on vegetation overhanging water. The larvae hatch and drop into the water where they seek out sponges to feed on. They use their elongated mouthparts to pierce the sponge and suck the fluids within. The larvae of some species cling to the surface of the sponge, while others take refuge in the sponge's internal cavities. The fully grown larvae leave the water and spin a cocoon in which to pupate.

=== Bioerosion ===
The Caribbean chicken-liver sponge Chondrilla nucula secretes toxins that kill coral polyps, allowing the sponges to grow over the coral skeletons. Others, especially in the family Clionaidae, use corrosive substances secreted by their archeocytes to tunnel into rocks, corals and the shells of dead mollusks. Sponges may remove up to 1 m (3.3 ft) per year from reefs, creating visible notches just below low-tide level.

=== Diseases ===
Caribbean sponges of the genus Aplysina suffer from Aplysina red band syndrome. This causes Aplysina to develop one or more rust-colored bands, sometimes with adjacent bands of necrotic tissue. These lesions may completely encircle branches of the sponge. The disease appears to be contagious and impacts approximately ten percent of A. cauliformis on Bahamian reefs. The rust-colored bands are caused by a cyanobacterium, but it is unknown whether this organism actually causes the disease.

=== Collaboration with other organisms ===
In addition to hosting photosynthesizing endosymbionts, sponges are noted for their wide range of collaborations with other organisms. The relatively large encrusting sponge Lissodendoryx colombiensis is most common on rocky surfaces, but has extended its range into seagrass meadows by letting itself be surrounded or overgrown by seagrass sponges, which are distasteful to the local starfish and therefore protect Lissodendoryx against them; in return, the seagrass sponges get higher positions away from the sea-floor sediment.

Shrimps of the genus Synalpheus form colonies in sponges, and each shrimp species inhabits a different sponge species, making Synalpheus one of the most diverse crustacean genera. Specifically, Synalpheus regalis utilizes the sponge not only as a food source, but also as a defense against other shrimp and predators. As many as 16,000 individuals inhabit a single loggerhead sponge, feeding off the larger particles that collect on the sponge as it filters the ocean to feed itself. Other crustaceans such as hermit crabs commonly have a specific species of sponge, Pseudospongosorites, grow on them as both the sponge and crab occupy gastropod shells until the crab and sponge outgrow the shell, eventually resulting in the crab using the sponge's body as protection instead of the shell until the crab finds a suitable replacement shell.

=== Sponge loop ===
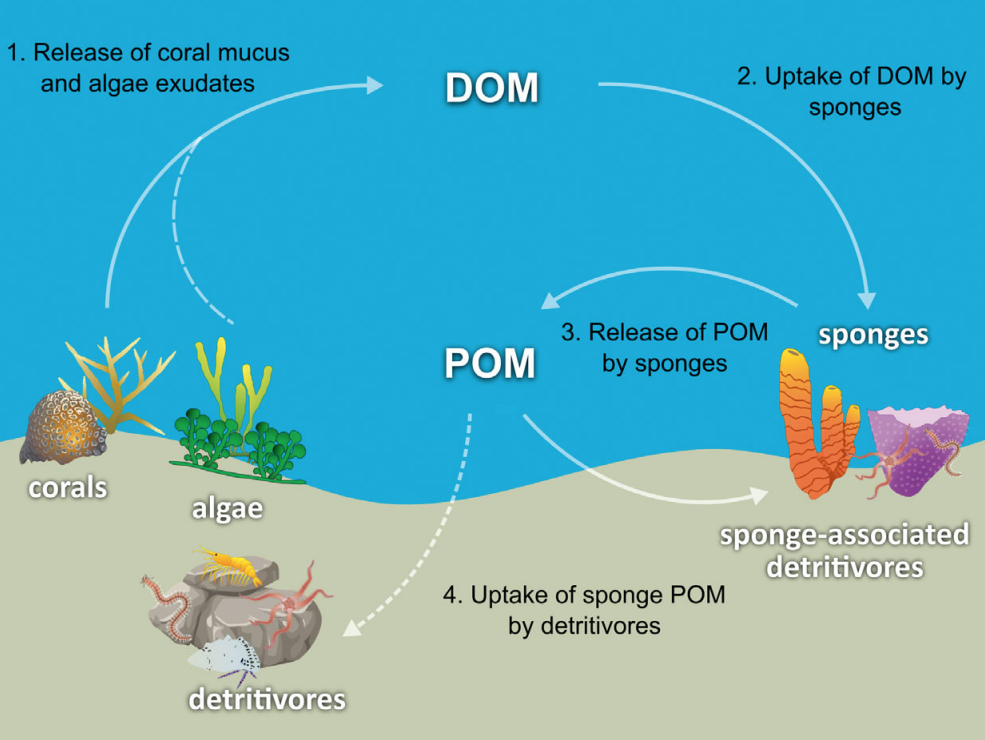
Sponge loop hypothesis. Steps of the sponge loop pathway: (1) corals and algae release exudates as dissolved organic matter (DOM), (2) sponges take up DOM, (3) sponges release detrital particulate organic matter (POM), (4) sponge detritus (POM) is taken up by sponge-associated and free-living detritivores.

Most sponges are detritivores that filter organic debris particles and microscopic life forms from ocean water. In particular, sponges occupy an important role as detritivores in coral reef food webs by recycling detritus to higher trophic levels.

The hypothesis has been made that coral reef sponges facilitate the transfer of coral-derived organic matter to their associated detritivores via the production of sponge detritus, as shown in the diagram. Several sponge species are able to convert coral-derived DOM into sponge detritus, and transfer organic matter produced by corals further up the reef food web. Corals release organic matter as both dissolved and particulate mucus, as well as cellular material such as expelled Symbiodinium.

Organic matter could be transferred from corals to sponges by all these pathways, but DOM likely makes up the largest fraction, as the majority (56 to 80%) of coral mucus dissolves in the water column, and coral loss of fixed carbon due to expulsion of Symbiodinium is typically negligible (0.01%) compared with mucus release (up to ~40%). Coral-derived organic matter could also be indirectly transferred to sponges via bacteria, which can also consume coral mucus.

=== Sponge microbiome ===
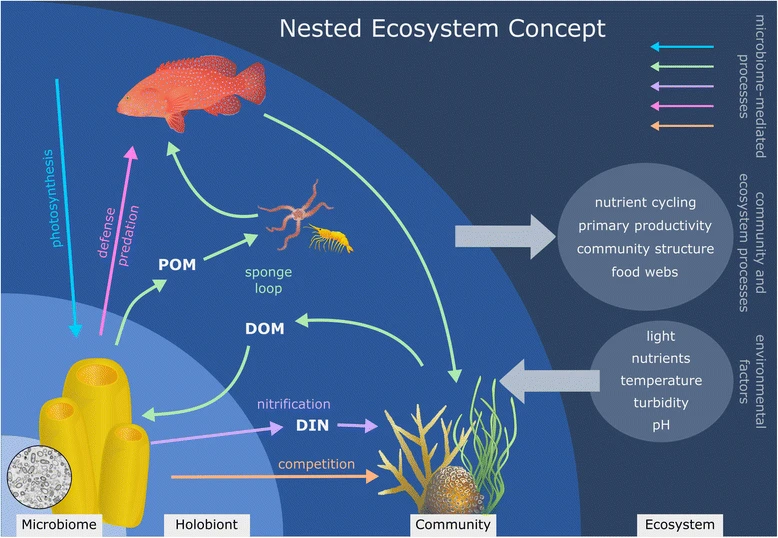
The sponge holobiont as a nested ecosystem. Key functions carried out by the sponge microbiome (colored arrows) influence holobiont functioning and, through cascading effects, subsequently influence community structure and ecosystem functioning.

Besides a one to one symbiotic relationship, it is possible for a host to become symbiotic with a microbial consortium, resulting in a diverse sponge microbiome. Sponges are able to host a wide range of microbial communities that can also be very specific. The microbial communities that form a symbiotic relationship with the sponge can amount to as much as 35% of the biomass of its host.

The term for this specific symbiotic relationship, where a microbial consortia pairs with a host is called a holobiotic relationship. The sponge as well as the microbial community associated with it will produce a large range of secondary metabolites that help protect it against predators through mechanisms such as chemical defense. The sponge holobiont is an example of the concept of nested ecosystems. Environmental factors act at multiple scales to alter microbiome, holobiont, community, and ecosystem scale processes. Thus, factors that alter microbiome functioning can lead to changes at the holobiont, community, or even ecosystem level and vice versa, illustrating the necessity of considering multiple scales when evaluating functioning in nested ecosystems.

Some of these relationships include endosymbionts within bacteriocyte cells, and cyanobacteria or microalgae found below the pinacoderm cell layer where they are able to receive the highest amount of light, used for phototrophy. They can host over 50 different microbial phyla and candidate phyla, including Alphaprotoebacteria, Actinomycetota, Chloroflexota, Nitrospirota, "Cyanobacteria", the taxa Gamma-, the candidate phylum Poribacteria, and Thaumarchaea.

== Systematics ==
=== Taxonomy ===
Carl Linnaeus, who classified most kinds of sessile animals as belonging to the order Zoophyta in the class Vermes, mistakenly identified the genus Spongia as plants in the order Algae. For a long time thereafter, sponges were assigned to subkingdom Parazoa ("beside the animals") separated from the Eumetazoa which formed the rest of the kingdom Animalia.

The phylum Porifera is further divided into classes mainly according to the composition of their skeletons:

- Hexactinellida (glass sponges) have silicate spicules, the largest of which have six rays and may be individual or fused. The main components of their bodies are syncytia in which large numbers of cell share a single external membrane.
- Calcarea have skeletons made of calcite, a form of calcium carbonate, which may form separate spicules or large masses. All the cells have a single nucleus and membrane.
- Most Demospongiae have silicate spicules or spongin fibers or both within their soft tissues. However, a few also have massive external skeletons made of aragonite, another form of calcium carbonate. All the cells have a single nucleus and membrane.
- Archeocyatha are known only as fossils from the Cambrian period.

In the 1970s, sponges with massive calcium carbonate skeletons were assigned to a separate class, Sclerospongiae, otherwise known as "coralline sponges". However, in the 1980s, it was found that these were all members of either the Calcarea or the Demospongiae.

So far scientific publications have identified about 9,000 poriferan species, of which about 400 are glass sponges, about 500 are calcareous species, and the rest are demosponges. However, some types of habitat, such as vertical rock and cave walls and galleries in rock and coral boulders, have been investigated very little, even in shallow seas, and may harbor many more species.

=== Classes ===
Sponges were traditionally distributed in three classes: calcareous sponges (Calcarea), glass sponges (Hexactinellida) and demosponges (Demospongiae). However, studies have now shown that the Homoscleromorpha, a group thought to belong to the Demospongiae, has a genetic relationship well separated from other sponge classes. Therefore, they have recently been recognized as the fourth class of sponges.

Sponges are divided into classes mainly according to the composition of their skeletons: These are arranged in evolutionary order as shown below in ascending order of their evolution from top to bottom:

Class	Type of cells	Spicules	Spongin fibers	Massive exoskeleton	Body form
Hexactinellida	Always mostly syncytia	Silica; Individual or fused	Never	Never	Leuconoid
Demospongiae	Single nucleus, single external membrane	Silica	In many species	In some species Made of aragonite, if present	Leuconoid
Calcarea	Single nucleus, single external membrane	Calcite individual or large masses	Never	Common; Made of calcite, if present	Asconoid, syconoid, leuconoid or solenoid
Homoscleromorpha	Single nucleus, single external membrane	Silica	In many species	Never	Sylleibid or leuconoid

=== Phylogeny ===

The phylogeny of sponges has been debated heavily since the advent of phylogenetics. Originally thought to be the sister group to all other animal phyla, there is now considerable evidence that Ctenophora may hold that title instead. Additionally, the monophyly of the phylum is now under question. Several studies have concluded that all other animals emerged from within the sponges, and usually recover that the calcareous sponges and Homoscleromorpha are closer to other animals than to demosponges. The internal relationships of Porifera have proven to be less uncertain. A close relationship of Homoscleromorpha and Calcarea has been recovered in nearly all studies, whether or not they support sponge or eumetazoan monophyly. The position of glass sponges is also fairly certain, with a majority of studies recovering them as the sister of the demosponges. Thus, the uncertainty at the base of the animal family tree is probably best represented by the below cladogram.

- Animalia
  - - Hexactinellida
    - Demospongiae
  - - Calcarea
    - Homoscleromorpha
  - Ctenophora
  - ParaHoxozoa

== Evolutionary history ==
=== Fossil record ===
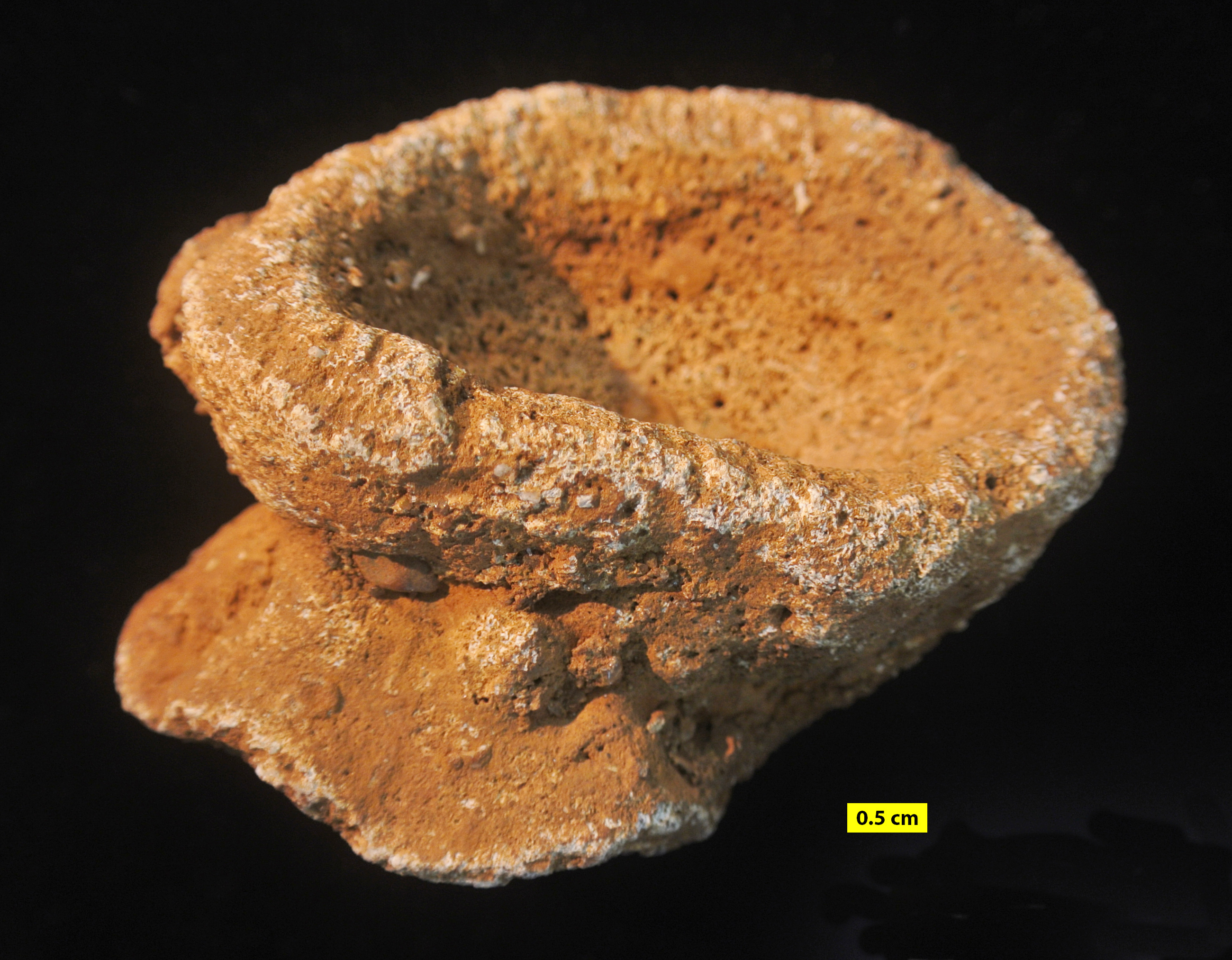
Raphidonema faringdonense, a fossil sponge from the Cretaceous of England

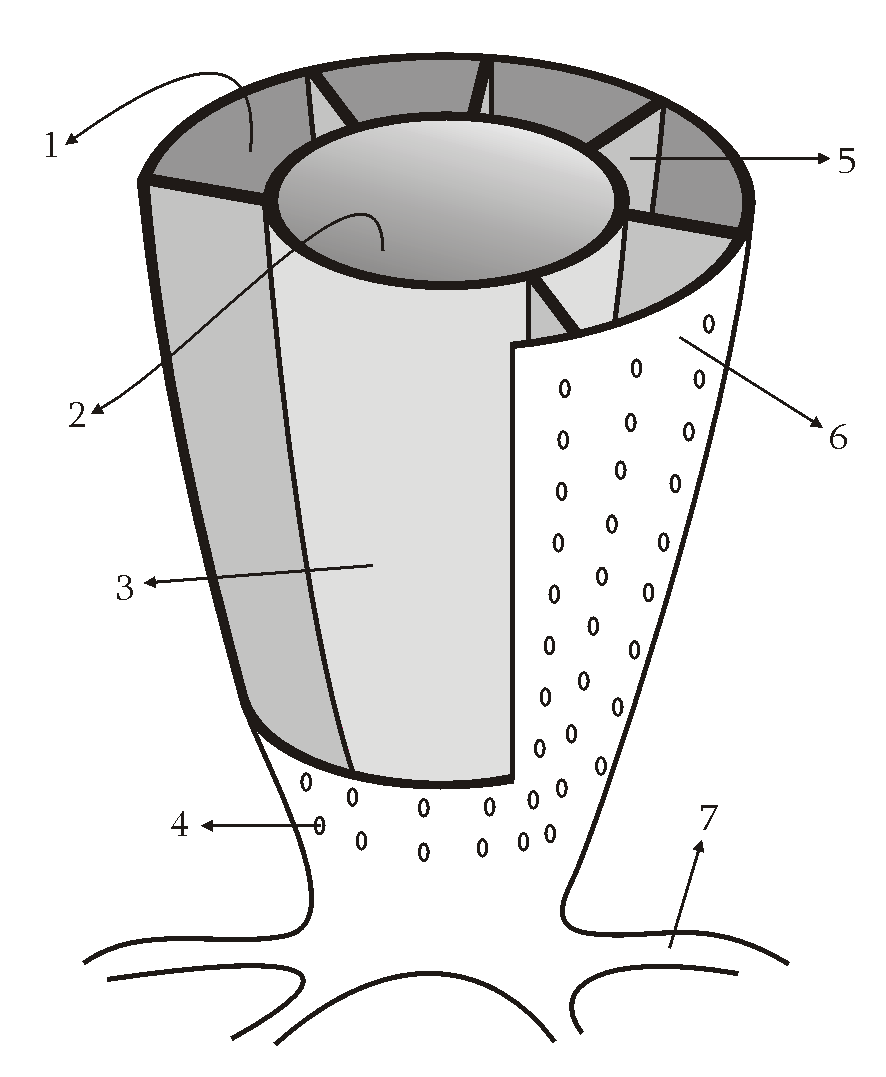
Archaeocyathid structure

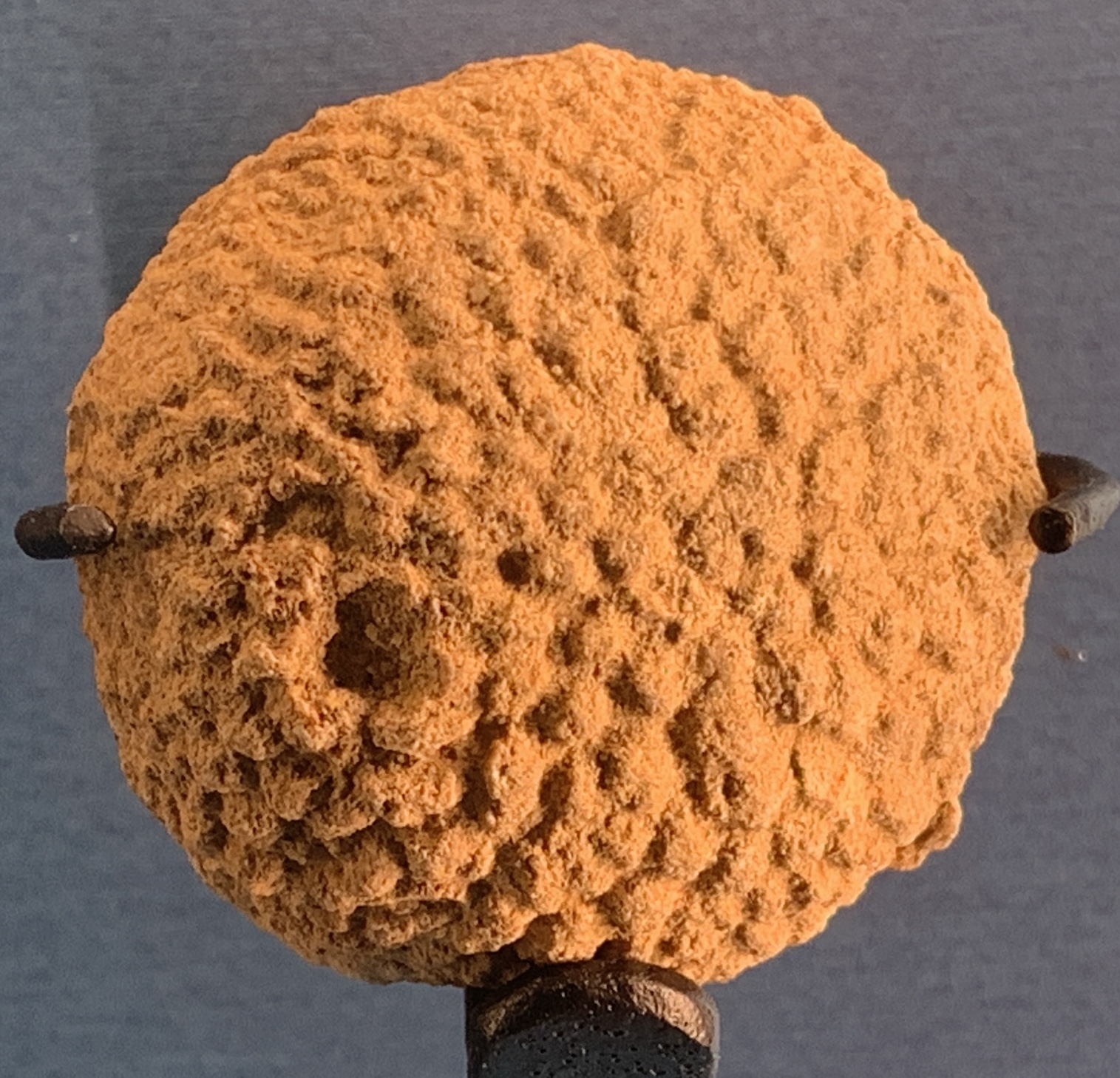
Nevadacoelia wistae, a fossil anthaspidellid demosponge from the early Ordovician of Nevada

Although molecular clocks and biomarkers suggest sponges existed well before the Cambrian explosion of life, silica spicules like those of demosponges are absent from the fossil record until the Cambrian. An unsubstantiated 2002 report exists of spicules in rocks dated around 750 million years ago. Since 2009, some researchers have argued that during the Cryogenian Period, potentially the oldest known fossils of sponges were formed. However, it is unclear whether these fossils actually belong to sponges, though the authors do not rule out the possibility of such fossils to represent proto-sponges or complex microbial precursors to sponge-grade organisms.

Several fossils have been interpreted as Precambrian sponge spicules or body fossils from as far as 1.02 billion years ago, but these fossils are doubtful and may instead represent abiogenic structures or remains of microorganisms. The earliest plausible sponges are two genera from the late Ediacaran Nama assemblage, the stem-hexactinellid Helicolocellus from the Dengying Formation and the possible stem-archaeocyathan Arimasia from the Nama Group. Early Cambrian sponges from Mexico belonging to the genus Kiwetinokia show evidence of fusion of several smaller spicules to form a single large spicule. Calcium carbonate spicules of calcareous sponges have been found in Early Cambrian rocks from about 530 to 523 million years ago in Australia. Other probable demosponges have been found in the Early Cambrian Chengjiang fauna, from 525 to 520 million years ago. Fossils found in the Canadian Northwest Territories dating to 890 million years ago may be sponges; if this finding is confirmed, it suggests the first animals appeared before the Neoproterozoic oxygenation event.

Oxygen content of the atmosphere over the last billion years. If confirmed, the discovery of fossilized sponges dating to 890 million years ago would predate the Neoproterozoic Oxygenation Event.

Freshwater sponges appear to be much younger, as the earliest known fossils date from the Mid-Eocene period about 48 to 40 million years ago. Although about 90% of modern sponges are demosponges, fossilized remains of this type are less common than those of other types because their skeletons are composed of relatively soft spongin that does not fossilize well. The earliest sponge symbionts are known from the early Silurian.

A chemical tracer is 24-isopropyl cholestane, which is a stable derivative of 24-isopropyl cholesterol, which is said to be produced by demosponges but not by eumetazoans ("true animals", i.e. cnidarians and bilaterians). Since choanoflagellates are thought to be animals' closest single-celled relatives, a team of scientists examined the biochemistry and genes of one choanoflagellate species. They concluded that this species could not produce 24-isopropyl cholesterol but that investigation of a wider range of choanoflagellates would be necessary in order to prove that the fossil 24-isopropyl cholestane could only have been produced by demosponges. Although a previous publication reported traces of the chemical 24-isopropyl cholestane in ancient rocks dating to 1,800 million years ago, recent research using a much more accurately dated rock series has revealed that these biomarkers only appear before the end of the Marinoan glaciation approximately 635 million years ago. However, the 30-carbon (C_{30}) steranes purported to be 'sponge biomarkers' can also be produced by algae and by single-celled rhizarians, and while it was argued that algae only evolved to produce those steranes in the Carboniferous, it has also been shown that C_{30} steranes can be formed through diagenetic alteration of algal C_{29} sterols, which suggests that Neoproterozoic 'sponge biomarkers' are more likely to represent diagenetically altered algal sterols.

Archaeocyathids, which some classify as a type of coralline sponge, are very common fossils in rocks from the Early Cambrian about 530 to 520 million years ago, but apparently died out by the end of the Cambrian 490 million years ago. It has been suggested that they were produced by: sponges; cnidarians; algae; foraminiferans; a completely separate phylum of animals, Archaeocyatha; or even a completely separate kingdom of life, labeled Archaeata or Inferibionta. Since the 1990s, archaeocyathids have been regarded as a distinctive group of sponges.

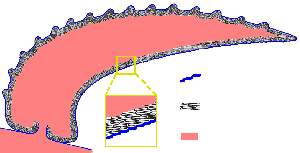
Halkieriid sclerite structure

It is difficult to fit chancelloriids into classifications of sponges or more complex animals. An analysis in 1996 concluded that they were closely related to sponges on the grounds that the detailed structure of chancellorid sclerites ("armor plates") is similar to that of fibers of spongin, a collagen protein, in modern keratose (horny) demosponges such as Darwinella. However, another analysis in 2002 concluded that chancelloriids are not sponges and may be intermediate between sponges and more complex animals, among other reasons because their skins were thicker and more tightly connected than those of sponges. In 2008, a detailed analysis of chancelloriids' sclerites concluded that they were very similar to those of halkieriids, mobile bilaterian animals that looked like slugs in chain mail and whose fossils are found in rocks from the very Early Cambrian to the Mid Cambrian. If this is correct, it would create a dilemma, as it is extremely unlikely that distantly related organisms could have developed such similar sclerites independently, but the huge difference in the structures of their bodies makes it hard to see how they could be closely related.

=== Relationships to other animal group ===
Simplified family tree showing calcareous sponges as closest to more complex animals

- Opisthokonta
  - Fungi
  - - Choanoflagellates
    - Metazoa
      - Glass sponges
      - - Demosponges
        - - Calcareous sponges
          - Eumetazoa
            - Comb jellies
            - - Homoscleromorpha
              - Placozoa
              - - Cnidaria
                  (jellyfish, etc.)
                - other metazoans

In the 1990s, sponges were widely regarded as a monophyletic group, all of them having descended from a common ancestor that was itself a sponge, and as the "sister-group" to all other metazoans (multi-celled animals), which themselves form a monophyletic group. On the other hand, some 1990s analyses also revived the idea that animals' nearest evolutionary relatives are choanoflagellates, single-celled organisms very similar to sponges' choanocytes – which would imply that most Metazoa evolved from very sponge-like ancestors and therefore that sponges may not be monophyletic, as the same sponge-like ancestors may have given rise both to modern sponges and to non-sponge members of Metazoa.

Analyses since 2001 have concluded that Eumetazoa (more complex than sponges) are more closely related to particular groups of sponges than to other sponge groups. Such conclusions imply that sponges are not monophyletic, because the last common ancestor of all sponges would also be a direct ancestor of the Eumetazoa, which are not sponges. A study in 2001 based on comparisons of ribosome DNA concluded that the most fundamental division within sponges was between glass sponges and the rest, and that Eumetazoa are more closely related to calcareous sponges (those with calcium carbonate spicules) than to other types of sponge. In 2007, one analysis based on comparisons of RNA and another based mainly on comparison of spicules concluded that demosponges and glass sponges are more closely related to each other than either is to the calcareous sponges, which in turn are more closely related to Eumetazoa.

Other anatomical and biochemical evidence links the Eumetazoa with Homoscleromorpha, a sub-group of demosponges. A comparison in 2007 of nuclear DNA, excluding glass sponges and comb jellies, concluded that:

- Homoscleromorpha are most closely related to Eumetazoa;
- calcareous sponges are the next closest;
- the other demosponges are evolutionary "aunts" of these groups; and
- the chancelloriids, bag-like animals whose fossils are found in Cambrian rocks, may be sponges.

The sperm of Homoscleromorpha share features with the sperm of Eumetazoa, that sperm of other sponges lack. In both Homoscleromorpha and Eumetazoa layers of cells are bound together by attachment to a carpet-like basal membrane composed mainly of "typ IV" collagen, a form of collagen not found in other sponges – although the spongin fibers that reinforce the mesohyl of all demosponges is similar to "type IV" collagen.

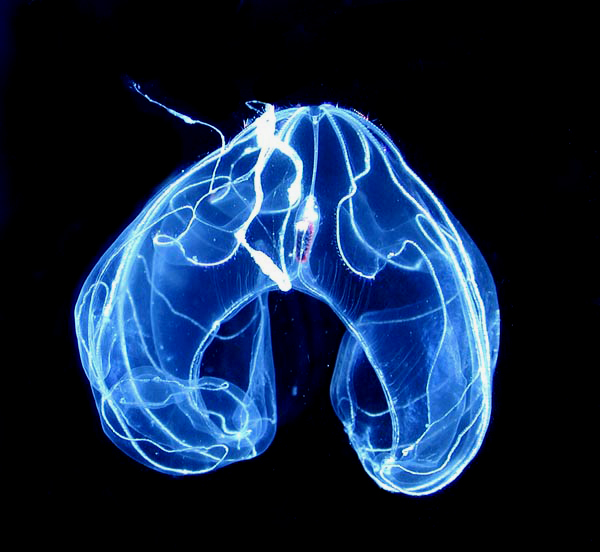
A comb jelly

The analyses described above concluded that sponges are closest to the ancestors of all Metazoa, of all multi-celled animals including both sponges and more complex groups. However, another comparison in 2008 of 150 genes in each of 21 genera, ranging from fungi to humans but including only two species of sponge, suggested that comb jellies (ctenophora) are the sister group to all other lineages of Metazoa included in the sample. If this is correct, either modern comb jellies developed their complex structures independently of other Metazoa, or sponges' ancestors were more complex and all known sponges are drastically simplified forms. The study recommended further analyses using a wider range of sponges and other simple Metazoa such as Placozoa.

However, reanalysis of the data showed that the computer algorithms used for analysis were misled by the presence of specific ctenophore genes that were markedly different from those of other species, leaving sponges as either the sister group to all other animals, or an ancestral paraphyletic grade. 'Family trees' constructed using a combination of all available data – morphological, developmental and molecular – concluded that the sponges are in fact a monophyletic group, and with the cnidarians form the sister group to the bilaterians.

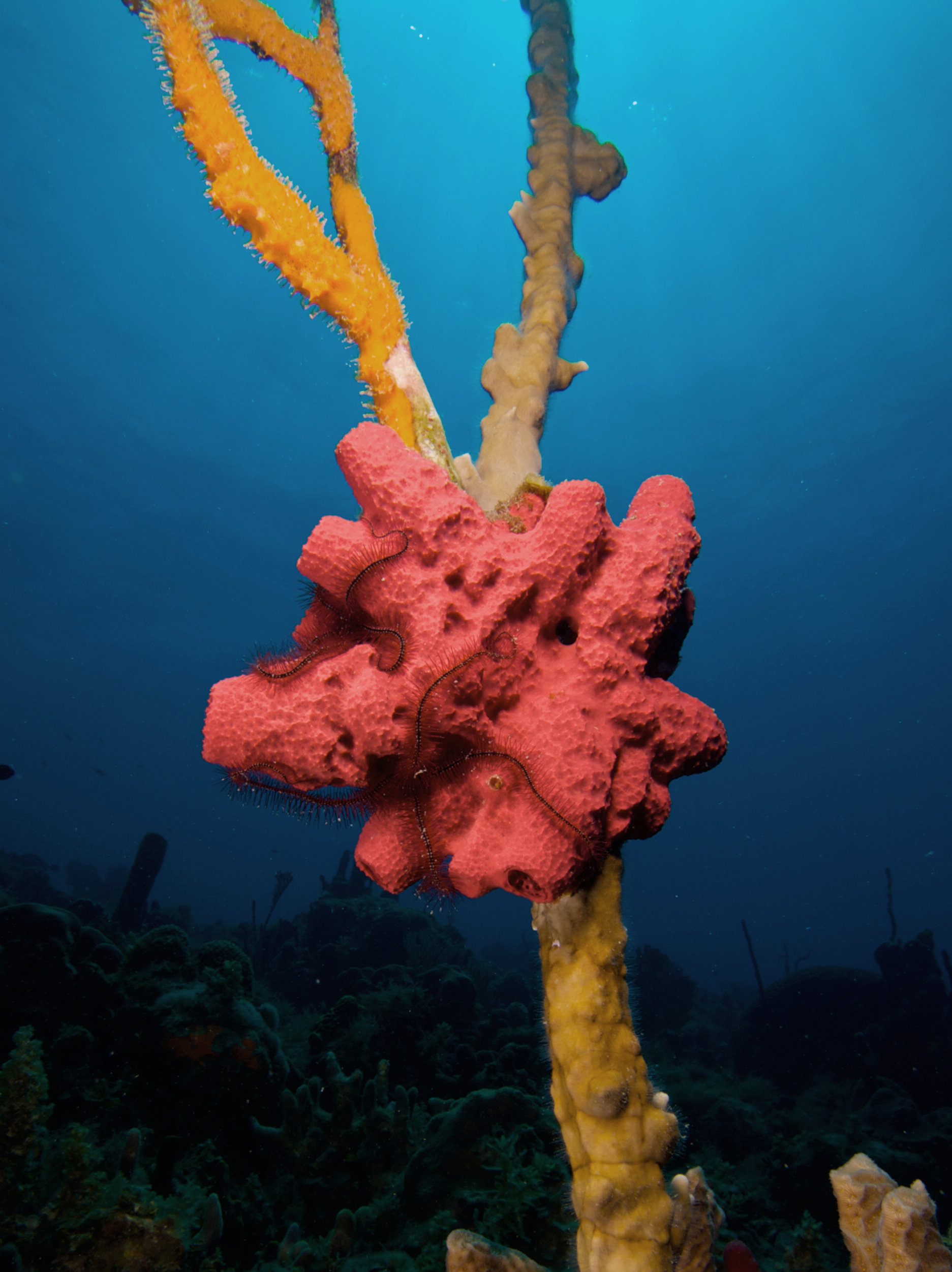
A sponge

A very large and internally consistent alignment of 1,719 proteins at the metazoan scale, published in 2017, showed that (i) sponges – represented by Homoscleromorpha, Calcarea, Hexactinellida, and Demospongiae – are monophyletic, (ii) sponges are sister-group to all other multicellular animals, (iii) ctenophores emerge as the second-earliest branching animal lineage, and (iv) placozoans emerge as the third animal lineage, followed by cnidarians sister-group to bilaterians.

In March 2021, scientists from Dublin found additional evidence that sponges are the sister group to all other animals, while in May 2023, Schultz et al. found patterns of irreversible change in genome synteny that provide strong evidence that ctenophores are the sister group to all other animals instead.

== Notable spongiologists ==
- Céline Allewaert
- Patricia Bergquist
- James Scott Bowerbank
- Maurice Burton
- Henry John Carter
- Max Walker de Laubenfels
- Arthur Dendy
- Édouard Placide Duchassaing de Fontbressin
- Randolph Kirkpatrick
- Robert J. Lendlmayer von Lendenfeld
- Edward Alfred Minchin
- Giovanni Domenico Nardo
- Eduard Oscar Schmidt
- Émile Topsent

== Use ==
=== By dolphins ===
A report in 1997 described use of sponges as a tool by bottlenose dolphins in Shark Bay in Western Australia. A dolphin will attach a marine sponge to its rostrum, which is presumably then used to protect it when searching for food in the sandy sea bottom. The behavior, known as sponging, has only been observed in this bay and is almost exclusively shown by females. A study in 2005 concluded that mothers teach the behavior to their daughters and that all the sponge users are closely related, suggesting that it is a fairly recent innovation.

=== By humans ===
==== Skeleton ====
The calcium carbonate or silica spicules of most sponge genera make them too rough for most uses, but two genera, Hippospongia and Spongia, have soft, entirely fibrous skeletons. Early Europeans used soft sponges for many purposes, including padding for helmets, portable drinking utensils and municipal water filters. Until the invention of synthetic sponges, they were used as cleaning tools, applicators for paints and ceramic glazes and discreet contraceptives. However, by the mid-20th century, overfishing brought both the animals and the industry close to extinction.

Many objects with sponge-like textures are now made of substances not derived from poriferans. Synthetic sponges include personal and household cleaning tools, breast implants, and contraceptive sponges. Typical materials used are cellulose foam, polyurethane foam, and less frequently, silicone foam.

The luffa "sponge", also spelled loofah, which is commonly sold for use in the kitchen or the shower, is not derived from an animal but mainly from the fibrous "skeleton" of the sponge gourd (Luffa aegyptiaca, Cucurbitaceae).

Sea sponges have also been used as an insertable menstrual product, and are sometimes marketed as reusable. Current assessments of their safety differ; early studies found them contaminated with mould, bacteria and sand, and the US Food and Drug Administration has not approved any sea sponges for sale as menstrual products in the US. Synthetic single-use alternatives are available in Australia and European Union countries, often called "soft tampons".

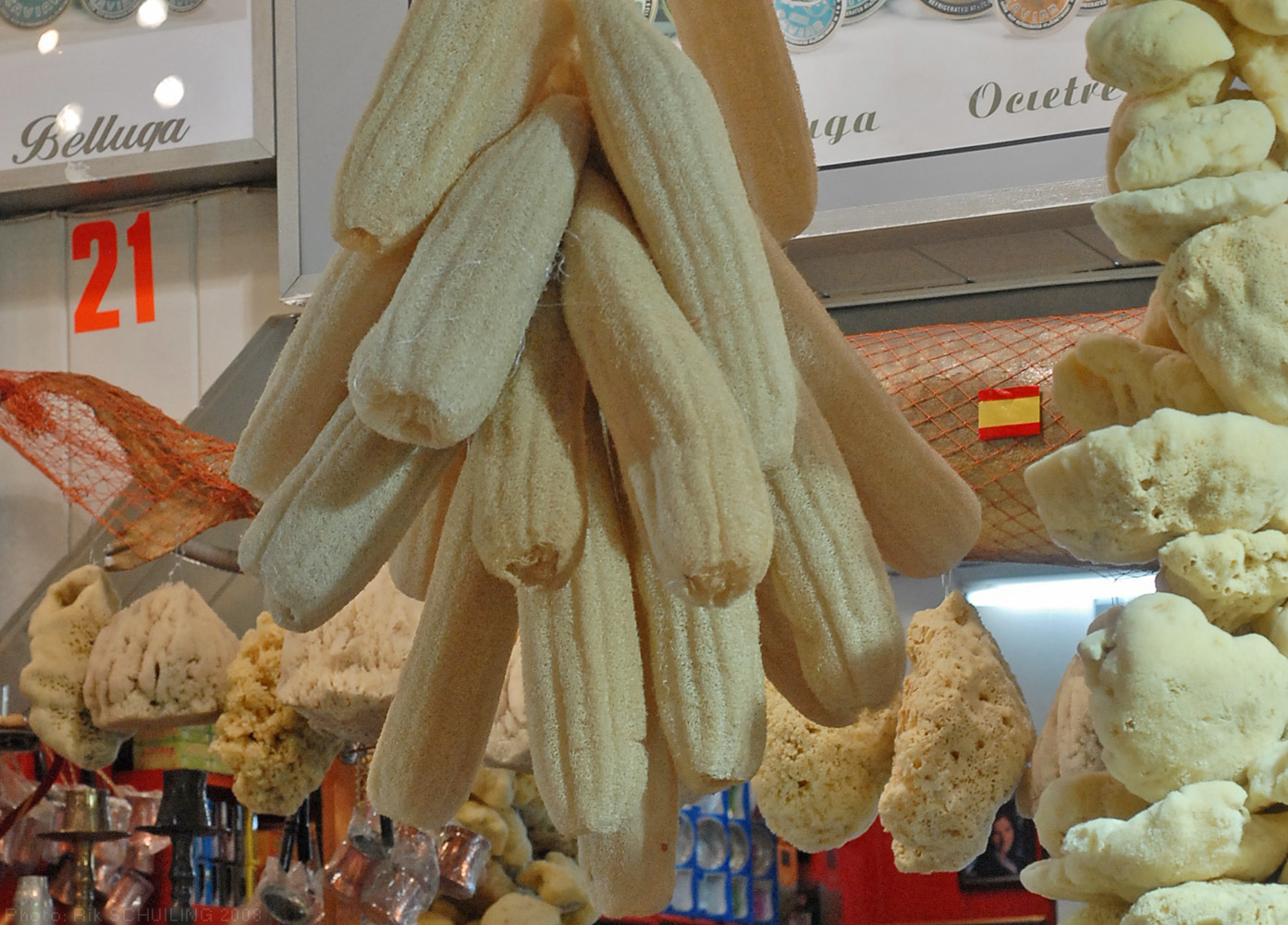
Sponges made of sponge gourd for sale alongside sponges of animal origin, Spice Bazaar, Istanbul

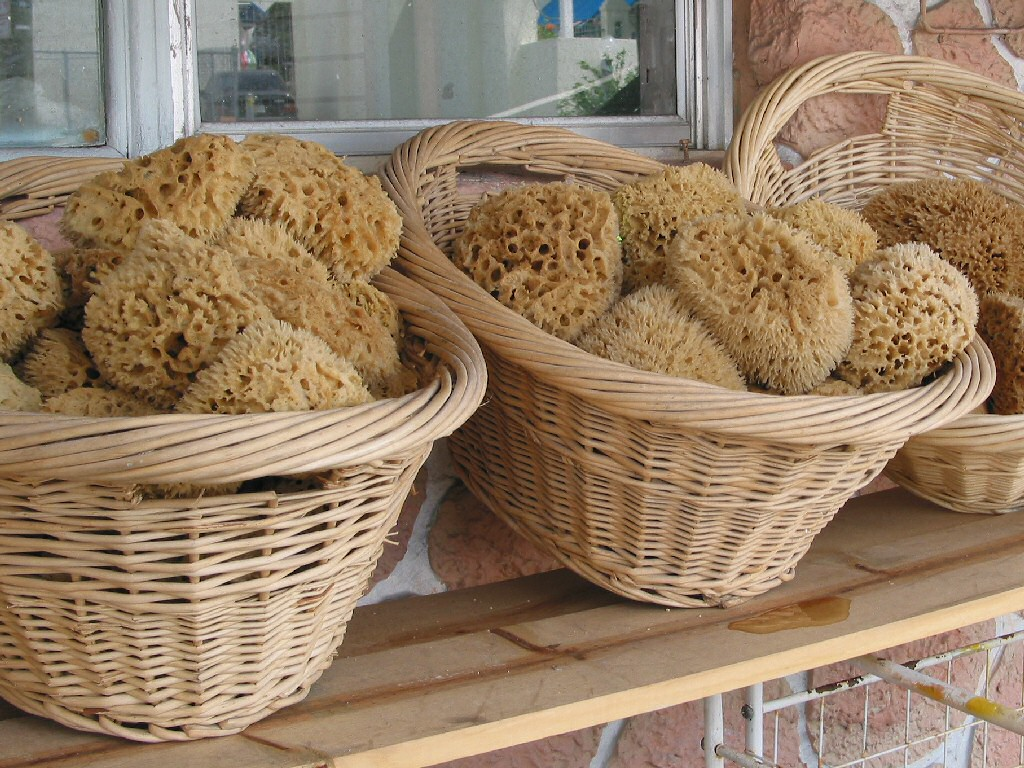
Natural sponges in Tarpon Springs, Florida

==== Medicinal compounds ====
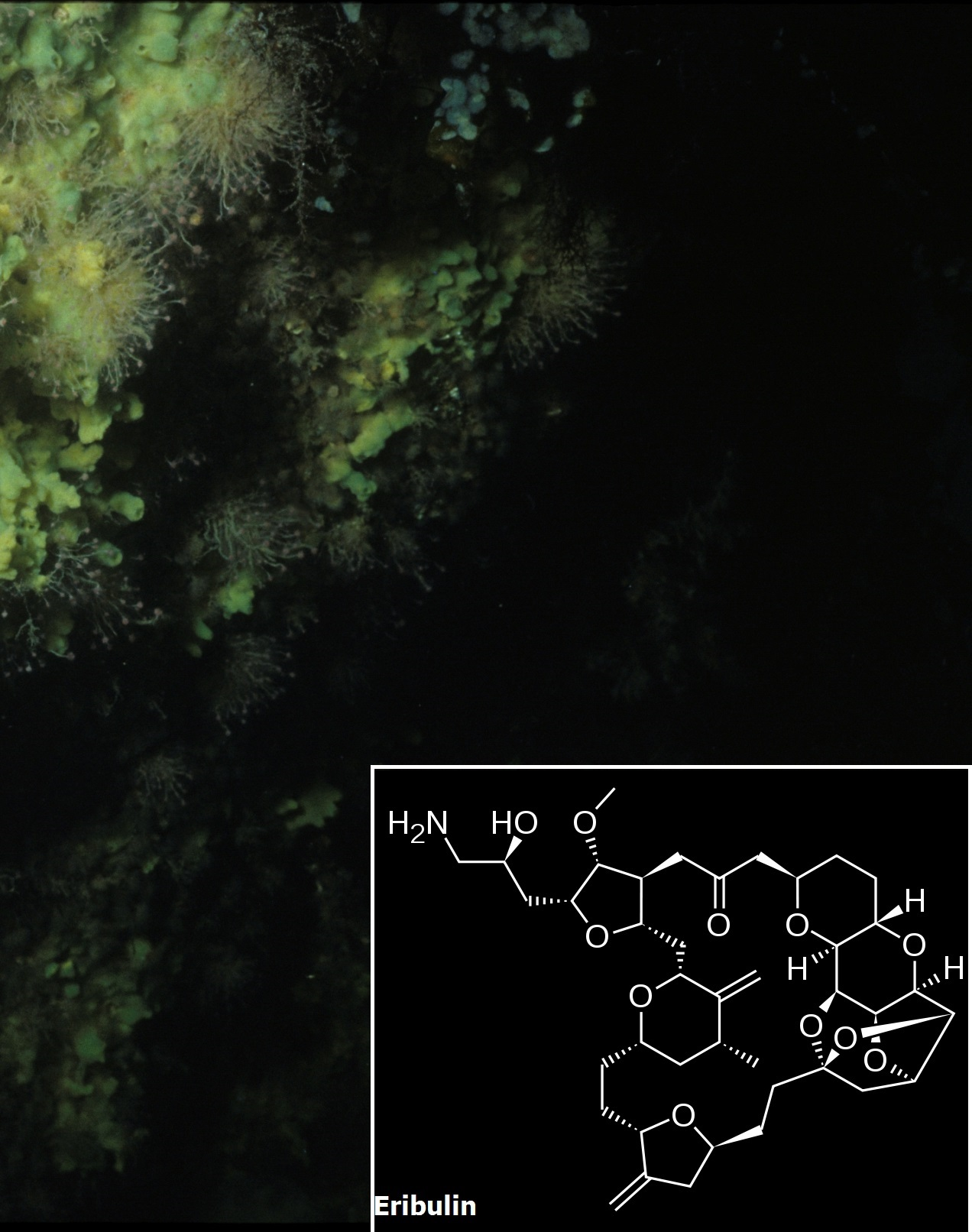
Halichondria produces the eribulin precursor halichondrin B

Sponges have medicinal potential due to the presence in sponges themselves or their microbial symbionts of chemicals that may be used to control viruses, bacteria, tumors and fungi.

Lacking any protective shell or means of escape, sponges have evolved to synthesize a variety of unusual compounds. One such class is the oxidized fatty acid derivatives called oxylipins. Members of this family have been found to have anti-cancer, anti-bacterial and anti-fungal properties. One example isolated from the Okinawan Plakortis sponges, plakoridine A, has shown potential as a cytotoxin to murine lymphoma cells.

== See also ==
- Lists of sponges
- Sponge Reef Project
- 3-alkylpyridinium, compounds found in marine Haplosclerida sponges
