= Gemmule =

Reproductive bud of sponges

Gemmules are internal buds found in sponges and are involved in asexual reproduction. It is an asexually reproduced mass of cells, that is capable of developing into a new organism i.e., an adult sponge.

== Role in asexual reproduction ==
Asexual reproduction in sponges occurs via budding, either by external or internal buds. The internal buds are called gemmules. Only endogenous types of buds develop into new sponges.

== Gemmule Development ==
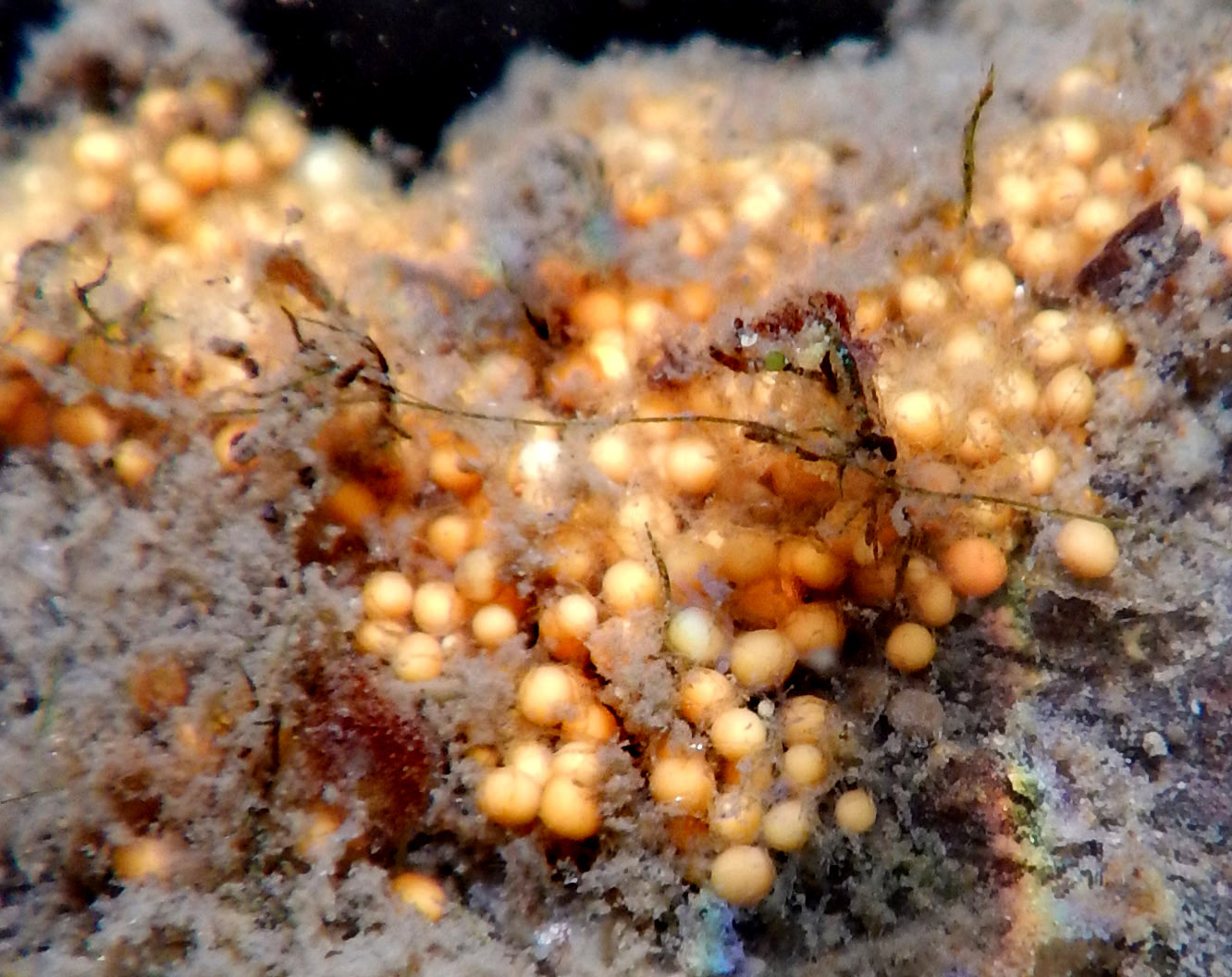

Amoebocytes, trophocytes, and spongocytes produced by the parent sponge assemble to form a new gemmule. These Amoebocytes differentiate into cells that produce different parts of the gemmule. Spongocytes produce spongin that begins forming the gemmule coat. Embedded in the spongin are exoskeletal fragments called spicules, which are made by sclerocytes. The gemmule coat contains a structure called the micropyle that allows the gemmule to open during germination. Inside the gemmule coat is a mass of amoebocytes and trophocytes. Amoebocytes absorb nutrients provided by trophocytes, triggering their differentiation into thesocytes. Thesocytes in marine sponges hold nutrients in storage granules, whereas freshwater sponges hold nutrients in vitelline platelets. The storage nutrients by thesocytes allow the gemmule to survive after the parent sponge has disintegrated. Gemmules enter a state of dormancy that persists until their environment is suitable for germination. Due to sponges’ temperature sensitivity, gemmules are often produced in the fall before the death of their parent sponge and germinate once temperatures rise again during spring.

== Germination ==
The Amoebocytes are released through the gemmule’s micropyle and differentiate into cells that produce various aspects of the new sponge body.

== Characteristics ==
Gemmules are resistant to desiccation, freezing, and anoxia, and can maintain dormancy for long periods of time. Gemmules are analogous to a bacterium's endospore and are made up of amoebocytes surrounded by a layer of spicules and can survive conditions that would kill adult sponges. When the environment becomes less hostile, the gemmule resumes growing.
