= Sponge microbiomes =

Community of microorganisms found in or around sponges

Sponge microbiomes are diverse communities of microorganisms in symbiotic association with marine sponges as their hosts. These microorganisms include bacteria, archaea, fungi, viruses, among others. The sponges have the ability to filter seawater and recycle nutrients while providing a safe habitat to many microorganisms, which provide the sponge host with fixed nitrogen and carbon, and stimulates the immune system.

Besides one to one symbiotic relationships, it is possible for a host to become symbiotic with a microbial consortium, resulting in a diverse sponge microbiome. Sponges are able to host a wide range of microbial communities that can also be very specific. The microbial communities that form a symbiotic relationship with the sponge can amount to as much as 35% of the biomass of its host. The sponge as well as the microbial community associated with it will produce a large range of secondary metabolites that help protect it against predators through mechanisms such as chemical defense.

The term for this specific symbiotic relationship, where a microbial consortia pairs with a host is called a holobiotic relationship. So together, a sponge and its microbiome form a holobiont, with a single sponge often containing more than 40 bacterial phyla, making sponge microbial environments a diverse and dense community. Furthermore, individual holobionts work hand in hand with other near holobionts becoming a nested ecosystem, affecting the environment at multiple scales.

Some of these relationships include endosymbionts within bacteriocyte cells, and cyanobacteria or microalgae found below the pinacoderm cell layer where they are able to receive the highest amount of light, used for phototrophy. They can host over 50 different microbial phyla and candidate phyla, including Alphaprotoebacteria, Actinomycetota, Chloroflexota, Nitrospirota, "Cyanobacteria", the taxa Gamma-, the candidate phylum Poribacteria, and Thaumarchaea.

== Composition ==
=== Microbiome species diversity ===
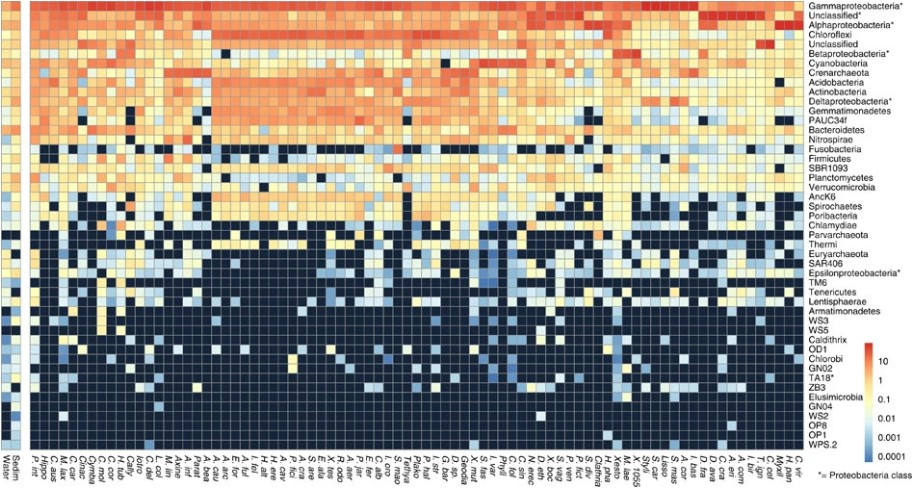
A heatmap of the taxonnomic profiles of microbial communities in different sponge species.

Microbial composition in sponges can differ based on the amount of light the microbes have access to. The outer layer of sponge, which is exposed to light, is usually inhabited by photosynthetically active microorganisms, such as Cyanobacteria, whereas the inner portion of the sponge is dominated by heterotrophic microbes. Shallow-water sponges in particular form complex host-microbe relationships within the marine ecosystem, with over 40 bacterial phyla identifiable on a sponge individual. Deep-sea sponge microbes are less diverse overall, but have more varied compositions between individual sponge organisms. Although there are common microorganism species shared by both shallow-water sponges and deep-sea sponges, many microbial species differ between the two sponges. For example, Chloroflexota was found in higher abundance in deep-sea sponges compared to shallow ones.

Sponges can be classified as High Microbial Abundance (HMA) sponges and Low Microbial Abundance (LMA) sponges based on the density of microorganisms they host. HMA sponges are specifically characterized by their capacity to support a 10^{10} cells per gram of sponge tissue, whereas LMA sponges are defined by a much lower density of 10^{6} cells per gram of sponge tissue. In HMA sponges, up to one third of the overall sponge biomass can be microbial biomass. Chloroflexota, Gammaproteobacteria, and Alphaproteobacteria are phyla and subphyla that have been reported to characterize HMA species. The HMA sponge communities were found to be complex, and are dominated by Proteobacteria, Cyanobacteria, Bacteroidetes, Acidobacteria, and Planctomycetes in the samples from Montgri Coast (northwest Mediterranean Sea). In contrast, LMA sponge communities have restricted the number of microbe species, including Proteobacteria and Cyanobacteria.

=== The sponge holobiont ===
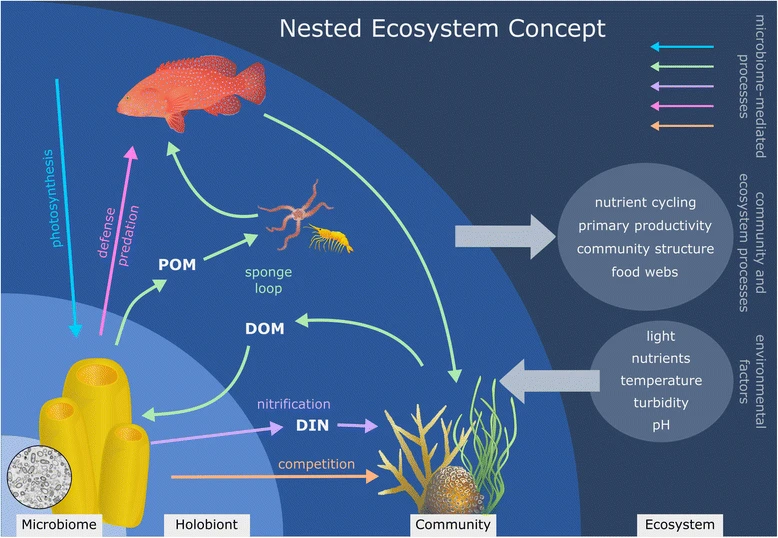
The sponge holobiont. Key functions carried out by the sponge microbiome (colored arrows) influence holobiont functioning and, through cascading effects, subsequently influence community structure and ecosystem functioning. (DOM: dissolved organic matter, POM: particulate organic matter, DIN: dissolved inorganic nitrogen)

A 'holobiont is an assemblage of a host and the other species which live in or around it, together forming a discrete ecological unit through symbiosis. Sponges and their associated microbiomes can be viewed as sponge holobionts. Holobionts form nested ecosystems. Environmental factors act at multiple scales to alter microbiome, holobiont, community, and ecosystem scale processes. Thus, factors that alter microbiome functioning can lead to changes at the holobiont, community, or even ecosystem level and vice versa, illustrating the necessity of considering multiple scales when evaluating functioning in nested ecosystems.

=== Symbiont acquisition ===
Sponge-specific symbionts are hypothesized to have begun their association with sponges as long as 600 million years ago, but there are several hypotheses as to how the microbes colonized and continued to inhabit sponges. The most evidenced hypothesis of sponge-specific symbionts says that sponges were colonized prior to sponge speciation, during the Precambrian period. This colonization is thought to have been maintained throughout the years by vertical transmission, which resulted in microbial species diverging alongside sponge species. Support for this hypothesis comes from the presence of fatty acids within sponges that are not present within the surrounding environment. These fatty acids are of microbial origin and appear within many different sponge species that share neither location nor ancestry, indicating that the microbial producers of these fatty acids colonized sponges before the sponge species differentiated. However, this hypothesis is still only a hypothesis, and it requires more evidence before it (or other hypotheses of microbe acquisition) can be confirmed.

== Ecological functions ==
=== Carbon metabolism ===
Marine sponges are commonly heterotrophic, getting their carbon from dissolved organic material or consumption of microorganisms. However, transfer of organic carbon from the microbiome to the sponge host has been demonstrated in several sponge species. This is most often observed in tropical sponges that carry dense communities of photosynthetic cyanobacteria, which use sunlight and oxygen to produce organic carbon. Some of that organic carbon is then provided to the sponge, largely in the form of glycerol. Sponges that live in high-light, low-nutrient locations such as tropical reefs rely heavily on organic carbon produced by their symbiotic cyanobacteria, and in some cases have been observed to gain more than 50% of their required energy from this carbon transfer. Alternately, sponges living in areas with less available light and higher nutrients (such as areas with higher water turbidity) demonstrate less association with cyanobacteria and less reliance on photosynthesis-derived organic carbon.

A more unusual form of carbon exchange utilizing methane has been observed in carnivorous deep-sea sponges (family Cladorhizidae) living near hydrothermal vents. The level of methanol dehydrogenase present within the sponge tissues indicates that these sponges are host to methanotrophic bacteria, which thrive off of methane gas from nearby hydrothermal vents. Instead of extracellular nutrient transfer (such as with photosynthetic cyanobacteria), most sponge cells are able to phagocytose old or dying bacterial cells, which are then used by the sponge as a source of organic carbon. Cladorhiza species are thought to benefit quite significantly from this symbiosis, as large sponge size and high sponge abundance is correlated with the methane flow of the most active hydrothermal vents, and Cladorhiza species are much less abundant away from the vents.

=== Nitrogen metabolism ===
Symbiotic microbes may assist sponges in the acquisition of organic nitrogen in two ways: nitrogen fixation and ammonia oxidation.

Symbiosis with nitrogen-fixing bacteria has been identified in several families of marine sponges through measurement of nitrogenase activity and is particularly beneficial for sponges in low-nitrogen waters, where fixed nitrogen is in very high demand. The symbiotic bacteria pull molecular nitrogen from the atmosphere and convert it into ammonia, nitrate, and other organic nitrogen-containing compounds that can then be utilized by the sponges.

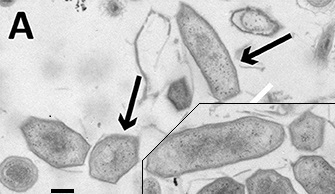
Methylomirabilis oxyfera

Many sponge species are inhabited by ammonia-oxidizing bacteria or archaea, making ammonia oxidation one of the best-studied symbiotic functions of the sponge microbiome. Symbiotic microbes use ammonium released by the sponges as a byproduct of digestion to fuel ammonia and nitrate oxidation, thus providing more fixed nitrogen for the sponges to use. Sponges' mechanism of pumping water through their tissues can result in deoxygenated zones, which could allow for microbial denitrification and anaerobic ammonia oxidation to occur. This is supported by the greater presence of genes related to denitrification and ammonia oxidation in sponge microbial communities than in surrounding free-living microbes. However, these communities do not have as many genes for nitric oxide reduction, which may lead to harmful buildup of nitric oxide in sponge tissues. At least one bacterial species (Candidatus Methylomirabilis oxyfera) has been identified in the sponge microbiome as being able to convert nitric oxide directly to oxygen and nitrogen gas, which could alleviate the buildup of nitric oxide and assist with oxygenating inner sponge tissues.

=== Sulfur metabolism ===
Unlike carbon and nitrogen metabolism, wherein organic carbon and nitrogen are transferred between sponges and resident microbes, sulfur metabolism within the sponge microbiome only involves the microbiota. The sponge acts as the environment in which sulfur-reducing and sulfur-oxidizing microbes carry out a sulfur cycle. This cycling likely takes place within the anaerobic zones of the sponge, as sulfur reduction is an anaerobic process. Accumulation of hydrogen sulfide – which is produced as a byproduct by sulfur-reducing bacteria and is toxic to sponges – is likely prevented by the presence of sulfur-oxidizing bacteria within the sponge microbiota. Current research suggests that sulfur-oxidizing bacteria may also allow sponges to root in sulfur-rich sediments that would otherwise be uninhabitable.

=== Synthesis of B Vitamins ===
B vitamins are an important resource for sponge cell metabolism. Sponges cannot synthesize their own B vitamins and so have no way to acquire these vitamins except through filter-feeding. Therefore, association with a B vitamin synthesizing microbe is favorable for the sponge host and may increase the stability of that microbe's presence in the sponge's microbiome. Through the analysis of transporters from symbionts and microbial phyla, six B vitamins have been detected to have come from sponge microbiomes: thiamine (vitamin B1), riboflavin (vitamin B2), pyridoxine (vitamin B6), biotin (vitamin B7), and cobalamin (B12).
