= 3-Alkylpyridinium =

Class of chemical compounds

Example of a cyclic 3-alkylpyridinium alkaloid

Example of a linear 3-alkylpyridine alkaloid, niphatyne A

3-Alkylpyridinium (3-AP) compounds are natural chemical compounds that are found in marine sponges belonging to the order Haplosclerida. Some polymers derived from 3-APs are anticholinesterase agents and show hemolytic and cytotoxic activities. More than 70 structurally different 3-APs have been isolated from marine sponges. However, not all such sponges contain 3-AP compounds. Variation in content of 3-APs has been detected even within a single sponge species collected from different geographical area.

== History ==
The chemical studies on sponges of the order Haplosclerida started in 1978 with the work of Schmitz et al. on different species of the genus Haliclona with the aim to identify the compounds responsible for the high ichthyotoxicity of the aqueous extract of this sponge. They were able to isolate the toxic halitoxin, identified as a complex mixture of 3-alkylpyridinium polymeric salts.

== Biological activities ==
Some 3-APs have biological activities such as cytotoxicity, ichthyotoxicity, inhibition of bacterial growth, and enzyme inhibition. These activities largely depend on degree of polymerization. The 3-APs polymers possess antimicrobial activity with increase in polymers and show cytolytic, cytotoxic and antifouling activities. The most widely employed are cytotoxicity assays on different normal or transformed cell lines, or antimicrobial assays.

=== Cytolytic activity ===
3-Alkylpyridinium monomers and compounds are considered to have cytolytic activity but at present there are no such reports found that support this mechanism. It appears that the 3-APs compounds that are polymeric in nature are able to permeabilize the cells. In addition the compounds of alkylpyridines are found to be structurally similar to the cationic surfactants indicating that they might be cytolytically quite active in future.

=== Cytotoxic activity ===
Almost all 3-APs compounds contains moderate cytotoxicity mechanism in concentration range of few micrograms per milliliter. Some of the cyclic alkylpyridinium compounds such as Cyclostellerramines and dehydrocyclostellettamines are reported to inhibit muscarinic acetylcholine receptors and histone deacetylase enzymes.

=== Antifouling agents ===
Poly-APs and other natural 3-alkylpyridine are effective on preventing microbial film formation and the tests also confirm that poly-APs form antifouling activities.
