= Pinacocyte =

Flat cell found in sponges

Pinacocytes are flattened cells that are found across the external surface and cover portions of the internal canal systems of sponges in phylum Porifera. When pinacocytes come together they from a pinacoderm, which is an epithelial like layer that protects the sponge and helps maintain its structure. Pinacocytes also take a key role in signaling, contraction, phagocytosis, and movement of water through the sponge. They are generally divided into three main types depending on where they are located in the sponge: exopinacocytes are found on the outer surface, endopinacocytes are found on the internal canals, and basopinacocytes are found along the base of the sponge where it anchors itself to the substrate. Due to the lack of nerves and conventional muscle found in sponges, and their ability to react to stimuli have made pinacocytes an important focus for research and how animal tissues have evolved.

== Structure and morphology ==
Histology of Leuclathrina translucida with exo/endo pinacocytes shown.

Pinacocytes are thin, flattened cells that form a connected protective layer across the surface of sponges, with their function being comparable to epithelial cells in living animals. The cells exact shape and organization can greatly vary based on where they are found in the sponge. The most detailed description of pinacocyte structure comes from the freshwater sponge Ephydatia muelleri, through the use of electron and fluorescence microscopy, published in 2025.

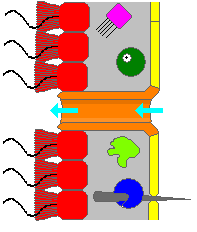
Porifera cell types. Pinacocytes are yellow.

In E. muelleri, the cells of the pinacoderm are tightly packed and joined by cell junctions. After staining with ruthenium red, the stain was not able to pass through the junctions between exopinacocytes. Indicating that these cells create a tight bond and prevent movement of material between cells. Beneath the exopinacocytes is a thin layer of collagen that is produced by mesohyl cells called lophocytes. The cytoskeleton of pinacocytes is unique as actin is localized at the edges of exopinacocytes, while in endopinacocytes and basopinacocytes it forms tracts which run across the cell. Further more basopinacocytes typically have a star shaped display of microtubules.

The pinacoderm is different from the typical epithelia found in many other animals in one important way. In most sponge classes no basal lamina is found under the pinacoderm. The homocleromorph sponges are an exception to this as they can be found with type IV collagen functioning like a basal lamina.

== Function ==
Pinacocytes contribute to several physiological processes in sponges: contraction, signalling, phagocytosis, and they help regulate the internal environment of the sponge.

Pinacocytes form the outer boundary of the sponge by enclosing the mesohyl, which is a gel matrix that contains the amoeboid cells and skeletal elements that help maintain the sponge shape. The pinacoderm functions as a barrier between the internal components of the sponge and the surrounding water.

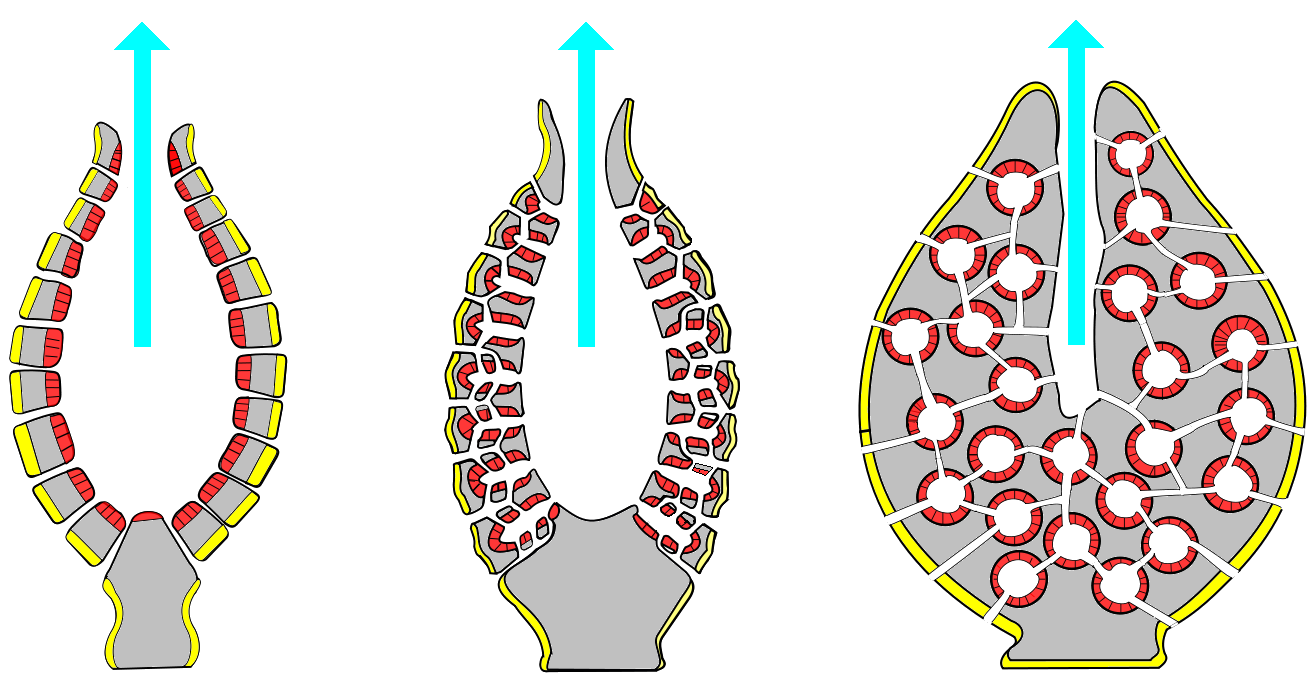
Body structures of Porifera with pinacocytes in yellow.

Pinacocytes can coordinate contractions to change the diameter of canals and help push water out of the sponge. In E. muelleri a physical stimuli triggers a series of contractions that is used to expel clumps of waste from the aquiferous system of the sponge. Bundles of actin filaments run across the endopinacocytes of the apical pinacoderm, and dense actin bunches join bundles in adjacent cell leading to a continuous tract that span the entire organism. During a response, the inflow pores in the pinacoderm close at the same time before the body and osculum contract. After the tissues begin to relax, three more cycles of inflation and contraction response occur. The speed of the contraction can vary based on the tissues. In peripheral canals the contractions can travel at 0.3-1 µm per second while in the osculum it can travel 6-122 µm per second. Cells in the mesohyl stop crawling when the wave of contraction passes, suggesting that an extracellular single helps spread the response, explaining why cellular sponges are capable of coordinated behavior despite lacking neurons or muscles.

Although choanocytes are the main feeding cells for sponges used to trap bacteria and other small food sources. Pinacocytes can be used to engulf larger particles that can't enter the ostia.

== Types of pinacocytes ==
Pinacocytes are classified into types according to their location and functions within the sponge. There are three main types of pinacocytes: exopinacocytes, endopinacocytes (containing three subtypes), and basopinacocytes.

Basipinacocytes line the base of the sponge and come in contact with the substrate that the sponge is attached to. They typically have a pentagonal or polygonal shape and have actin tracts and a star shaped microtubule distribution.

Exopinacocytes coat the outer surface of the sponge. In E. mulleri are flat and pentagonal shaped with a centrally located nucleus. alongside exopinacocytes in sponges epithelial layer are porocytes. While not classified as a pinacocytes they constrain ostia and allow for water to enter providing an essential function alongside exopinacocytes.

Endopinacocytes line the sponge’s internal canals and ducts with three different types existing.

- Endoinacocyte I form the lower lining of the dermal layer and create the surface of the subdermal space. The shape of these cells are flat and elongated but can sometimes be polygonal.
- Endopinacocyte II line canal in the sponge. The cells are a polygonal shape with actin at their edges.
- Endoinacocyte III are flat cells with holes which are used to support the base of choanocytes and form the openings into choanocyte chambers.

== Development and differentiation ==
Pinacocytes arise from the cellular differentiation from stem and progenitor cells. This differentiation are part of the sponges ongoing cell recycling and renewal process. In sponges, amoeboid cells are archaeocytes that move around the mesohyl and function as stem cells which give rise to other cell types. In E. muelleri, individual archaeocytes showed a range of gene expression compared to choanocytes indicating that archaeocytes include cells in a variety of transformative states.

== Evolutionary significance ==
Sponges are one of the earliest animal groups and their body plans lack mouths, guts, muscles, and a nervous system. This makes their tissues particularly appealing to investigate the evolutionary steps that developed advanced animal epithelia, and the role pinacocytes have played in that process.

In the past epithelia has been defined from bilaterian animals by three main features: polarity, junctions between cells, and a basement membrane. As most sponges lack a basal lamina, the pinacoderm can be seen as evolutionarily early basement membrane. As well in E. muelleri resistance to statining indicating tight junctions between exopinacocytes. Pinacocytes' special ability to perform a coordinated contraction also point to early methods of sensation and control before nervous and true muscle evolved.
