= Archaeocyte =

Amoeboid cells found in sponges

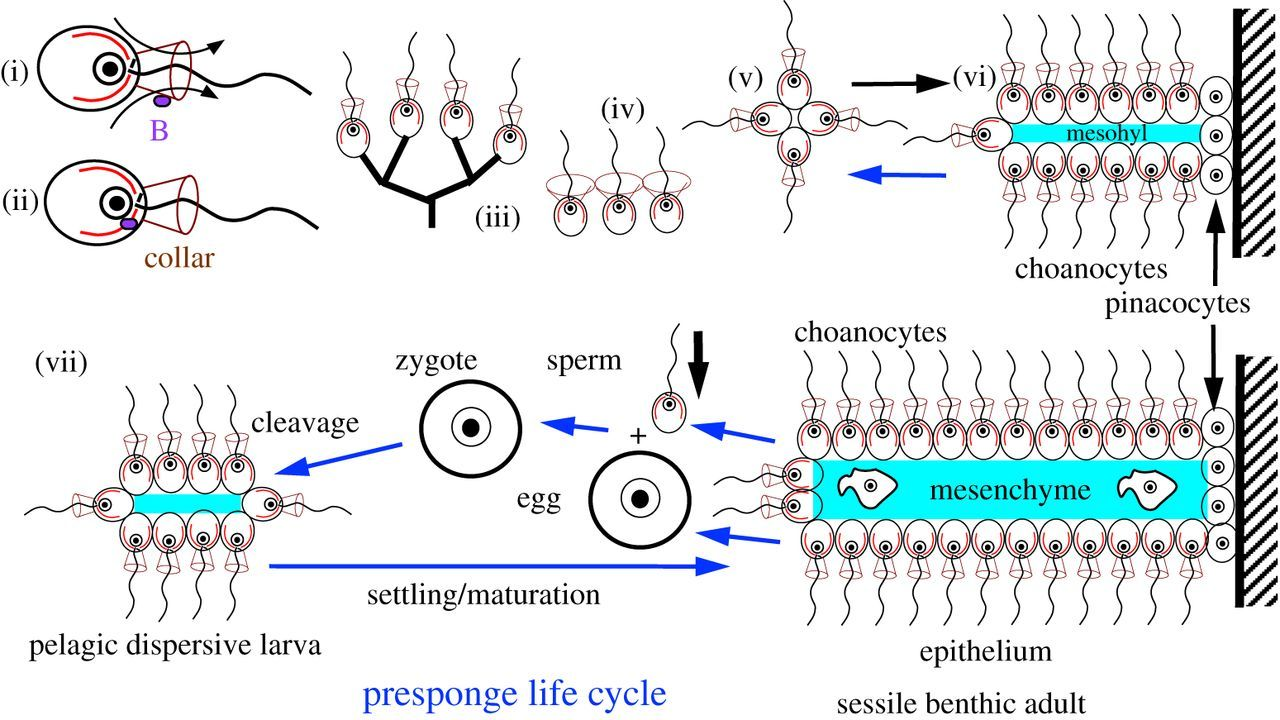

Archaeocytes (from Greek archaios "beginning" and kytos "hollow vessel") or amoebocytes are amoeboid cells found in sponges. They are totipotent and have varied functions depending on the species. The structure of these cells match to that of the stem cells as of containing high cytoplasmic content that helps the cells to morph according to their function.

== Location ==
Archaeocytes are along with other specialized sponge cells including collencytes and structural elements called spicules. They move about within the mesohyl with amoeba-like movements performing a number of important functions.

== Functions ==
Cellular differentiation is an essential function of the archaeocyte. All specialized cells within the sponge have its origins with the archaeocyte. This is especially important in reproduction as the sex cells of the sponge in sexual reproduction are formed from these amoeboid cells. Similarly in asexual reproduction amoebocytes result in the formation of gemmules which are cyst-like spheres containing more amoebocytes as well as other sponge cells including the phylum specific choanocyte. These cells move within the walls of a sponge and form spicules.
