= Plakoridine A =

Names
- Systematic IUPAC name Methyl (2S,3S,4R,5E)-4-hydroxy-1-[2-(4-hydroxyphenyl)ethyl]-5-(2-oxooctadecylidene)-2-propyl-3-pyrrolidinecarboxylate

Identifiers
CAS Number	155944-28-8
3D model (JSmol)	Interactive image
ChemSpider	8432945
PubChem CID	10257462
CompTox Dashboard (EPA)	DTXSID601031468
- InChI: InChI=1S/C35H57NO5/c1-4-6-7-8-9-10-11-12-13-14-15-16-17-18-20-30(38)27-32-34(39)33(35(40)41-3)31(19-5-2)36(32)26-25-28-21-23-29(37)24-22-28/h21-24,27,31,33-34,37,39H,4-20,25-26H2,1-3H3/b32-27+/t31-,33-,34-/m0/s1 Key: ULFKEEJTLUNSEY-CWJJWNJISA-N
- SMILES: O=C(/C=C2/N(CCc1ccc(O)cc1)[C@H]([C@H](C(=O)OC)[C@H]2O)CCC)CCCCCCCCCCCCCCCC

Properties
Chemical formula	C_{35}H_{57}NO_{5}
Molar mass	571.843 g·mol^{−1}
- Except where otherwise noted, data are given for materials in their standard state (at 25 °C [77 °F], 100 kPa). Infobox references

Plakoridine A is an alkaloid isolated from the marine sponge Plakortis sp. There are three plakoridines known, named plakoridine A, B, and C.
