= Sclerocyte =

Cells secreting mineralized structures in the body wall of some invertebrates

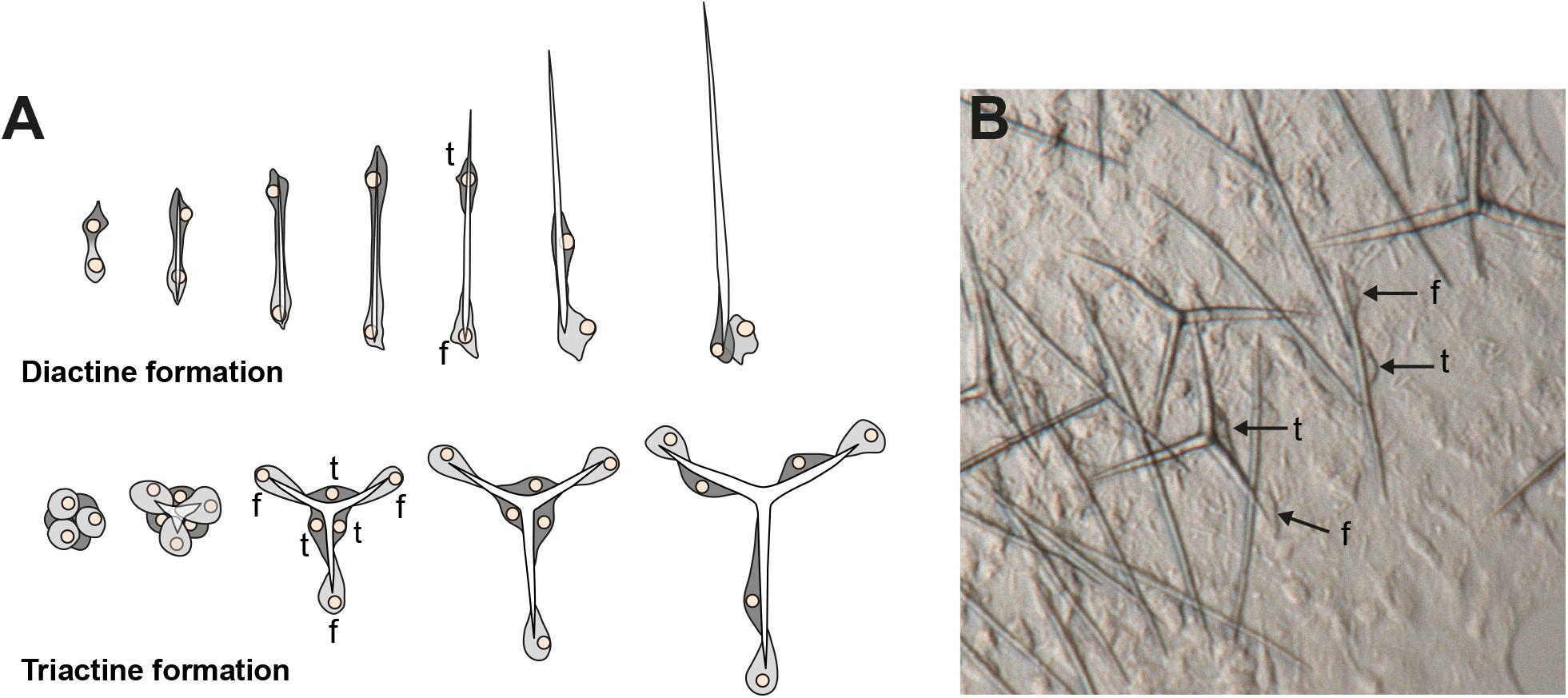
Formation of spicule by sclerocytes in calcareous sponges

Sclerocytes are specialised cells that secrete the mineralized structures in the body wall of some invertebrates.

In sponges they secrete calcareous or siliceous spicules which are found in the mesohyl layer of sponges. The sclerocytes produce spicules via formation of a cellular triad. The triad of cells then undergo mitosis, creating six sclerocytes. In pairs, the sclerocytes secrete the minerals which create the spicules.

In starfish they are present in the dermis and secrete the calcite microcrystals from which the ossicles are formed. They also function in growth and repair of the ossicles.
