= Spongin =

Protein found in sponges

Spongin, a modified type of collagen protein, forms the fibrous skeleton of most organisms among the phylum Porifera, the sponges. It is secreted by sponge cells known as spongocytes.

Spongin gives a sponge its flexibility. True spongin is found only in members of the class Demospongiae. Its molecular structure remains incompletely characterized, however it shares similarities with both collagen and keratin.

== Research directions ==
=== Use in the removal of phenolic compounds from wastewater ===
Researchers have found spongin to be useful in the photocatalytic degradation and removal of bisphenols (such as BPA) in wastewater. A heterogeneous catalyst consisting of a spongin scaffold for iron phthalocyanine (SFe) in conjunction with peroxide and UV radiation has been shown to remove phenolic wastes more quickly and efficiently than conventional methods. Other research using spongin scaffolds for the immobilization of Trametes versicolor Laccase has shown similar results in phenol degradation.

== Molecular structure ==
Structure of spongin remains incompletely understood due to limitations in protein analytical methods. Although its chemical composition shares some features with collagen and keratin, spongin is a distinct biopolymer characterized by halogenated amino acids, primarily bromine, with smaller amounts of iodine and chlorine. Additionally, the presence of xylose and significant mineralization with calcium carbonate and silica further differentiates spongin from collagen and keratin.

=== Collagen-like characteristics ===
Spongin and collagen exhibit comparable filament structure, both displaying a hierarchical organization of nanofibrils, microfibrils, and fibers, as well as a triple-helical based structure. Spongin microfibrilis measure approximately 10 nm in diameter and exhibit a periodic banding pattern every 60 nm, comparing to collagen's 67 nm periodicity. Despite the structural similarities, amino acid analysis reveals that spongin contains significantly higher levels of tyrosine residues, approximately 90% of which are mono- or di-brominated derivatives. This abundance of tyrosine is related to the oxidation of phenylalanine residues, which are prevalent in collagen but nearly absent in spongin. The brominated tyrosine derivatives are hypothesized to play a crucial role in stabilizing spongin's triple-helical structure through cross-linking.

=== Keratin-like characteristics ===
Spongin also exhibits compositional similarities to keratin, particularly in its sulfur content and thermal stability. It withstands temperatures up to 300 °C, which is more characteristic for keratin than collagen. However, due to spongin's distinct biochemical features, its full molecular classification remains unknown.
