= Boring sponge =

Boring sponge may refer to several different species of sponges:

- Cliona californiana, the yellow boring sponge or sulphur sponge
- Cliona celata, commonly named the red boring sponge
- Cliona viridis, commonly named the green boring sponge
- Dragmacidon lunaecharta, commonly named the red boring sponge
- Pione vastifica, commonly named the red boring sponge
