= Spheciospongia vesparium =

Loggerhead Sponge'

Scientific classification
- Kingdom: Animalia
- Phylum: Porifera
- Class: Demospongiae
- Order: Clionaida
- Family: Clionaidae
- Genus: Spheciospongia
- Species: S. vesparium

Binomial name
- Spheciospongia vesparium Lamarck, 1815

Synonyms
- List: Alcyonium vesparium Lamarck, 1815; Cliona cribrosa (Schmidt, 1870); Heterocliona cribraria Verrill, 1907; Hymeniacidon pulvinatus Bowerbank, 1872; Papillina cribrosa Schmidt, 1870; Poterion atlantica George & Wilson, 1919; Prianos tierneyi de Laubenfels, 1953; Pseudosuberites melanos Laubenfels, 1934; Spheciospongia othello de Laubenfels, 1950; Spheciospongia vesparia [lapsus]; Spirastrella andrewsi George & Wilson, 1919; Spirastrella pulvinata (Bowerbank, 1872); Spongia dysoni Carter, 1882; Thalysias vesparia (Lamarck, 1814)

Species of sponge

Spheciospongia vesparium, commonly known as the loggerhead sponge, is a species of sea sponge belonging to the family Clionaidae. While it is highly toxic to many fish, this sponge is eaten by certain angelfish and is known to form part of the diet of the hawksbill sea turtle (Eretmochelys imbricata).

== Description ==
This massive sponge has varying forms in different locations. One common form is barrel-shaped or cake-shaped with a flattened top, but it may also be roughly globular or amorphous. The texture is firm, tough and dense. The surface is broadly undulating and rough, with a mixture of large and small osculi surrounded by groups of fine pores, each 1 to 2 mm (0.04 to 0.08 in) in diameter. The color of the sponge both inside and out is purplish, gray or brownish-black, and the surface is often partly obscured by sediment or by algae growing on it.

== Distribution and habitat ==
This sponge is native to the Caribbean Sea and around the coasts of the Bahamas and Florida. It occurs on patch reefs and in lagoons; when growing on soft sediment it often has a wider and deeper base than when growing on rock. Its depth range is 5 to 15 m (16 to 49 ft).

== Ecology ==
Although it is toxic to many vertebrates, some fish have been observed to feed on this sponge, a fact confirmed by fragments of the sponge being found in their guts; these fish include the queen angelfish (Holacanthus ciliaris), the rock beauty (Holacanthus tricolor) and the French angelfish (Pomacanthus paru). Other predators feeding on the sponge include the polychaete worm Branchiosyllis oculata, and the red cushion sea star (Oreaster reticulatus). It is also preyed upon by the hawksbill sea turtle (Eretmochelys imbricata).

The tunnels and cavities inside the sponge are home to a wide array of invertebrates. Being a suspension feeder, this sponge has been found to be helpful in controlling harmful blooms of cyanobacteria; sites in Florida Bay with an abundance of loggerhead sponges were found to have few or no blooms whereas similar sites with few sponges had long-lasting, dense blooms.
