= Cliona delitrix =

Scientific classification
- Kingdom: Animalia
- Phylum: Porifera
- Class: Demospongiae
- Order: Clionaida
- Family: Clionaidae
- Genus: Cliona
- Species: C. delitrix

Binomial name
- Cliona delitrix Pang, 1973

Species of sponge

Cliona delitrix is a species of burrowing demosponge belonging to the family Clionaidae. It is found in shallow water in the Caribbean Sea and the Gulf of Mexico.

== Description ==
Cliona delitrix is a burrowing sponge that is also encrusting. It usually grows on a massive coral, not only covering its surface but also burrowing into its interior, but is sometimes found on some other calcareous substrate such as a shell or a limestone rock. It does not normally grow on branching corals. It can grow to a diameter of up to a metre (yard) and has several large openings called osculi, 10 to 30 mm (0.4 to 1.2 in) wide, surrounded by projecting rims and many small raised papillae 2 to 5 mm (0.1 to 0.2 in) wide. The colour is usually red or dark orange.

== Distribution and habitat ==
Cliona delitrix is found in the Caribbean Sea and Gulf of Mexico at depths down to 4 metres (13 ft). Its range extends from Cuba and Mexico south to Venezuela and Brazil. It is abundant in some areas especially where there is organic pollution.

== Biology ==
The main corals on which Cliona delitrix grows are Siderastrea siderea, Diploria labyrinthiformis and Montastraea cavernosa. The sponge is a filter feeder, removing bacteria and other organic particles from the current of water sucked in through its many pores by the movement of flagella. There are channels and chambers inside the sponge and the water finds its way through them and exits through the osculi. The zoanthid coral Parazoanthus parasiticus is often found growing on the surface of this sponge.

Cliona delitrix is a hermaphrodite. The male gametes are produced first and get swept out by the water current. If they are sucked into another sponge, fertilisation can take place. The larvae may be brooded for a while inside the sponge but then leave through the osculi and become planktonic. They drift with the current before settling on the seabed. Each one then starts to grows over the surface of whatever it has landed on. It needs calcium to flourish and if it settles on something calcareous like a massive coral, it will secrete acid to dissolve it as well as continuing to grow over the surface. The interior of the coral may be riddled with holes filled with orange spongy material. The sponge kills the part of the coral close to its growing edge. It is an aggressive species and large corals may have the greater part of their surface covered while small individuals may be completely engulfed.

When a massive coral is already dead, the sponge excavates the interior while it colonises the surface, but if encrusting algae are already established on the surface, the sponge's growth is slowed down. In a study off the coast of Colombia, the most favoured host for the sponge was the starlet coral (Siderastrea siderea) and between 6% and 9% of individuals of this species were affected. It is such an aggressive sponge that it is considered likely that, in areas where it is present, branching and foliose corals may come to out-number massive corals in the long term. When a colonised coral dies and crumbles, parts of the sponge in the excavated tunnels may break up and detached pieces may become established in a new location, a form of asexual reproduction.
