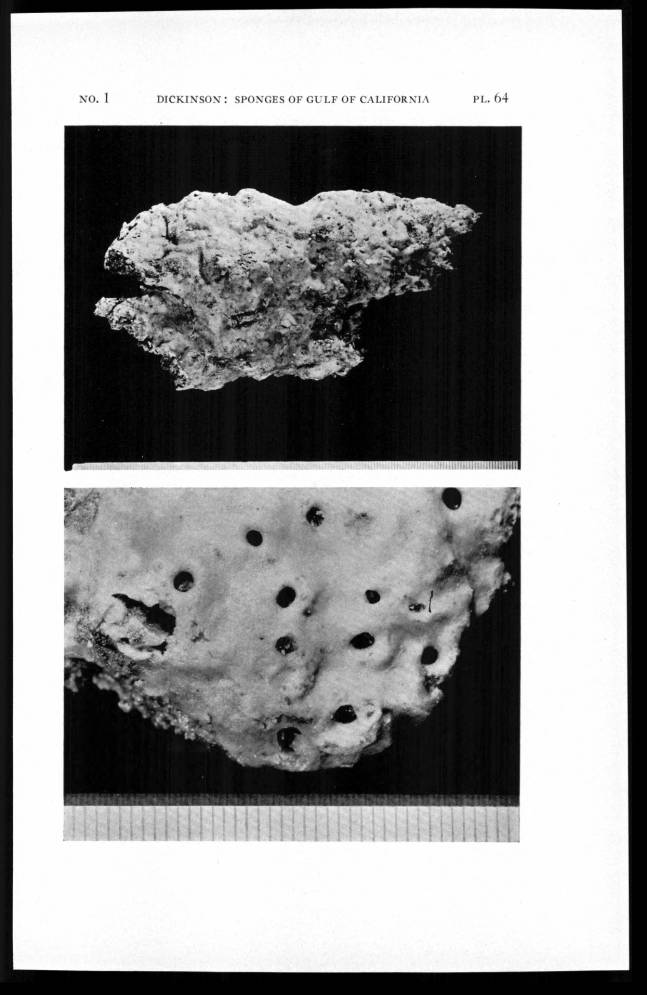

Scientific classification
- Domain: Eukaryota
- Kingdom: Animalia
- Phylum: Porifera
- Class: Demospongiae
- Order: Clionaida
- Family: Spirastrellidae
- Genus: Spirastrella
- Species: S. coccinea

Binomial name
- Spirastrella coccinea (Duchassaing & Michelotti, 1864)

Synonyms
- Thalysias coccinea Duchassaing & Michelotti, 1864

= Spirastrella coccinea =

Species of sponge

Spirastrella coccinea is a species of marine sponge in the family Spirastrellidae. It is found in the tropical western Atlantic Ocean, the Caribbean Sea, and the Gulf of Mexico.

== Description ==
Spirastrella coccinea is a thin encrusting sponge, less than 10 mm (0.4 in) thick, forming patches of a square metre or more, covering the substrate. The oscula (holes through which water leaves the sponge) are often raised on low mounds and are up to 2 mm (0.1 in) in diameter; transparent star-shaped canals radiate from the oscula. The texture of the sponge is smooth and leathery, red on the surface and brownish-red or orange on the interior. Sponges in shallow water are orangish-red while those at greater depths are red or pink, sometimes with white specks near the oscula. The spicules that stiffen the sponge and form the skeleton are tylostyles, rods with one end pointed and the other knobbed, and there are also microscleres in the tissues, but no spongin fibres.

== Distribution and habitat ==
Spirastrella coccinea is found in the Caribbean Sea, the Gulf of Mexico and the tropical western Atlantic Ocean as far south as Brazil. It grows on hard substrates, coral reefs and coral rubble at depths down to about 15 m (50 ft), and has been found in a submarine cave as well as among mangrove roots.

== Research ==
Being soft-bodied, sessile organisms that lack physical defences, sponges have developed chemical defences to protect them from predation. Many of these compounds are bioactive and are of interest in pharmaceutical research. A novel mitotic inhibitor macrolide known as "Sprirastrellolide A" has been isolated from Spirastrella coccinea. The methyl ester of Sprirastrellolide A has the unusual biological property of causing cells to start dividing when they are at other stages of the cell cycle, before stopping them dividing partway through the process. Another macrolide, "Sprirastrellolide B", has also been isolated and its structure elucidated. Since then, five further macrolides, "Sprirastrellolide C to G" have been found in extracts of the sponge, their structures being elucidated by spectroscopic analysis and chemical means.
