= Cliona orientalis =

Scientific classification
- Kingdom: Animalia
- Phylum: Porifera
- Class: Demospongiae
- Order: Clionaida
- Family: Clionaidae
- Genus: Cliona
- Species: C. orientalis

Binomial name
- Cliona orientalis Thiele, 1900

Synonyms
- Anthosigmella orientalis (Thiele, 1900)

Species of sponge

Cliona orientalis is a species of demosponge in the family Clionaidae. It occurs in the Indo-Pacific region and is a bioeroding species, with various specialisations for living on and inside calcareous substrates such as massive corals and molluscs.

== Distribution and habitat ==
C. orientalis is native to the tropical Indo-Pacific region. Its range extends from East Africa and Madagascar, through India and the Maldives, to northern Australia, the Philippines, and many island groups in the Western Pacific Ocean. Its depth range is down to about 100 m (330 ft).

== Ecology ==
Like other demosponges, C. orientalis is a filter feeder. Water is drawn in through fine pores, the nutritious particles are filtered out, and the water exits the sponge through the oscula. In addition, this sponge is able to extract nutrition from dissolved sugars in the water.

It is a hermaphrodite; sperm are liberated into the water column and drawn into another individual via the water current, fertilisation being internal. The embryos are brooded within the sponge at first before being liberated through the oscula as parenchymella larva. These are planktonic, and when sufficiently developed, settle on a suitable substrate and undergo metamorphosis into juvenile sponges.

This sponge is a bioeroder. On suitable calcareous substrates such as coralline rock, massive corals and mollusc shells, pieces of solid material are chipped away using chemicals produced by "etching cells" and the sponge tunnels into the material. The fluted giant clam Tridacna squamosa is attacked in this way, and corals attacked include Goniopora tenuidens, Porites sp., Astreopora listeri, Favites halicora, Dipsastraea pallida, Goniastrea retiformis and Cyphastrea serailia.

In research designed to mimic the effects of rising sea surface temperatures, it was found that this sponge expelled its Symbiodinium when the temperature reached 32 °C (90 °F), becoming bleached, and showed little capacity to recover when the temperature was subsequently reduced.
