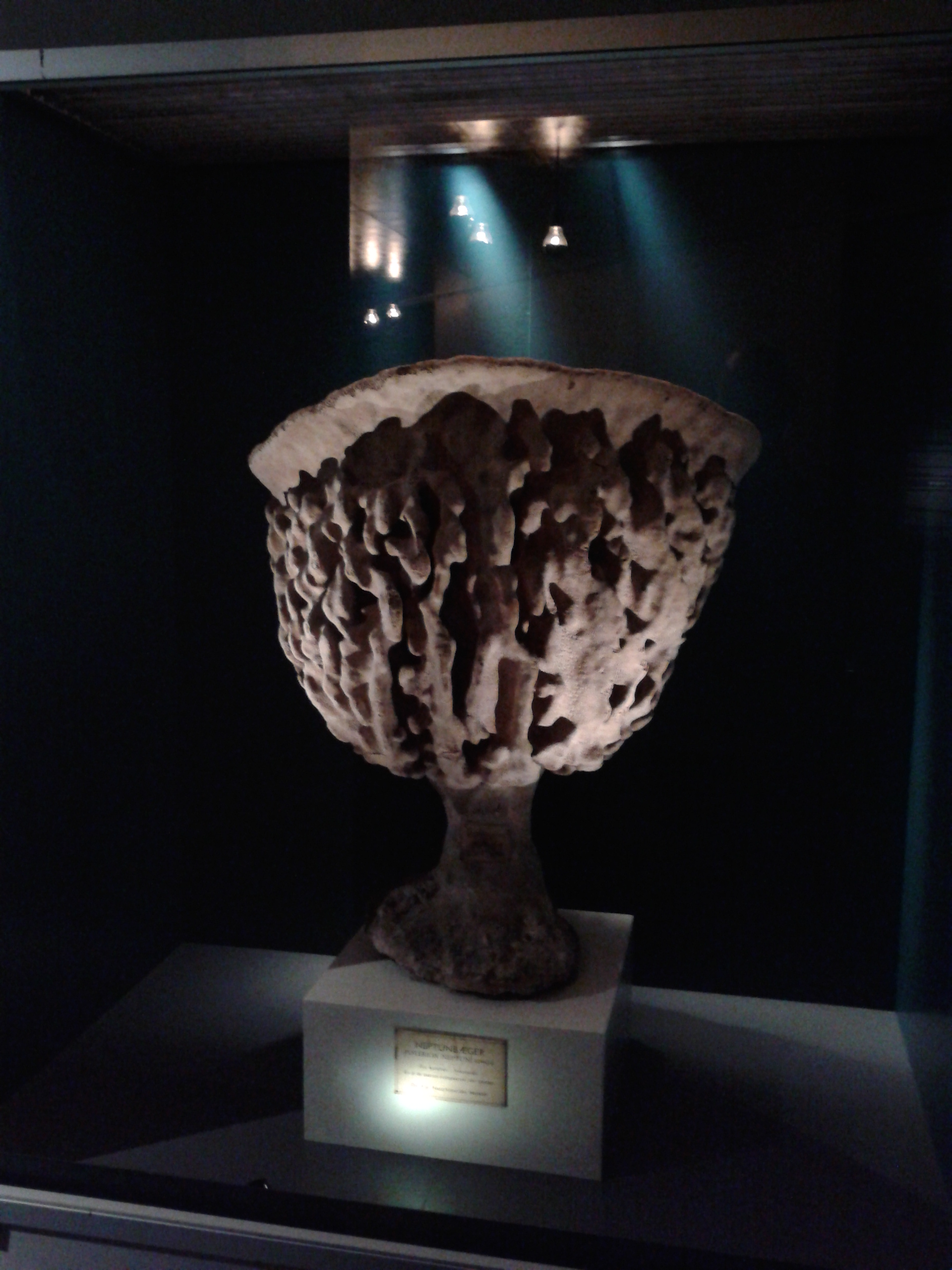

Scientific classification
- Kingdom: Animalia
- Phylum: Porifera
- Class: Demospongiae
- Order: Clionaida
- Family: Clionaidae
- Genus: Cliona
- Species: C. patera

Binomial name
- Cliona patera (Hardwicke, 1820)

Synonyms
- List: Cliona amphitritae (Harting, 1870); Poterion amphitritae Harting, 1870; Poterion neptuni Schlegel, 1858; Poterion patera (Hardwicke, 1820); Rhaphiophora patera (Hardwicke, 1820); Spongia neptuni Schlegel, 1858; Spongia patera Hardwicke, 1820

= Cliona patera =

Neptune's cup

Species of sponge

Cliona patera, commonly called Neptune's cup sponge, is a species of demosponge in the family Clionaidae.

Among the larger known sponges at up to a meter in height and width, the common name Neptune's cup refers to its characteristic wine glass shape and the Roman god of the sea. The species was thought to be extinct since late 1900s due to overharvesting, but live specimens were discovered in 2011 off the coast of Singapore and Thailand. Later they were transported so they can be close enough to reproduce. Another population was later found in Cambodia. In the early 1900s, they were used as baby baths because they grew so large.
