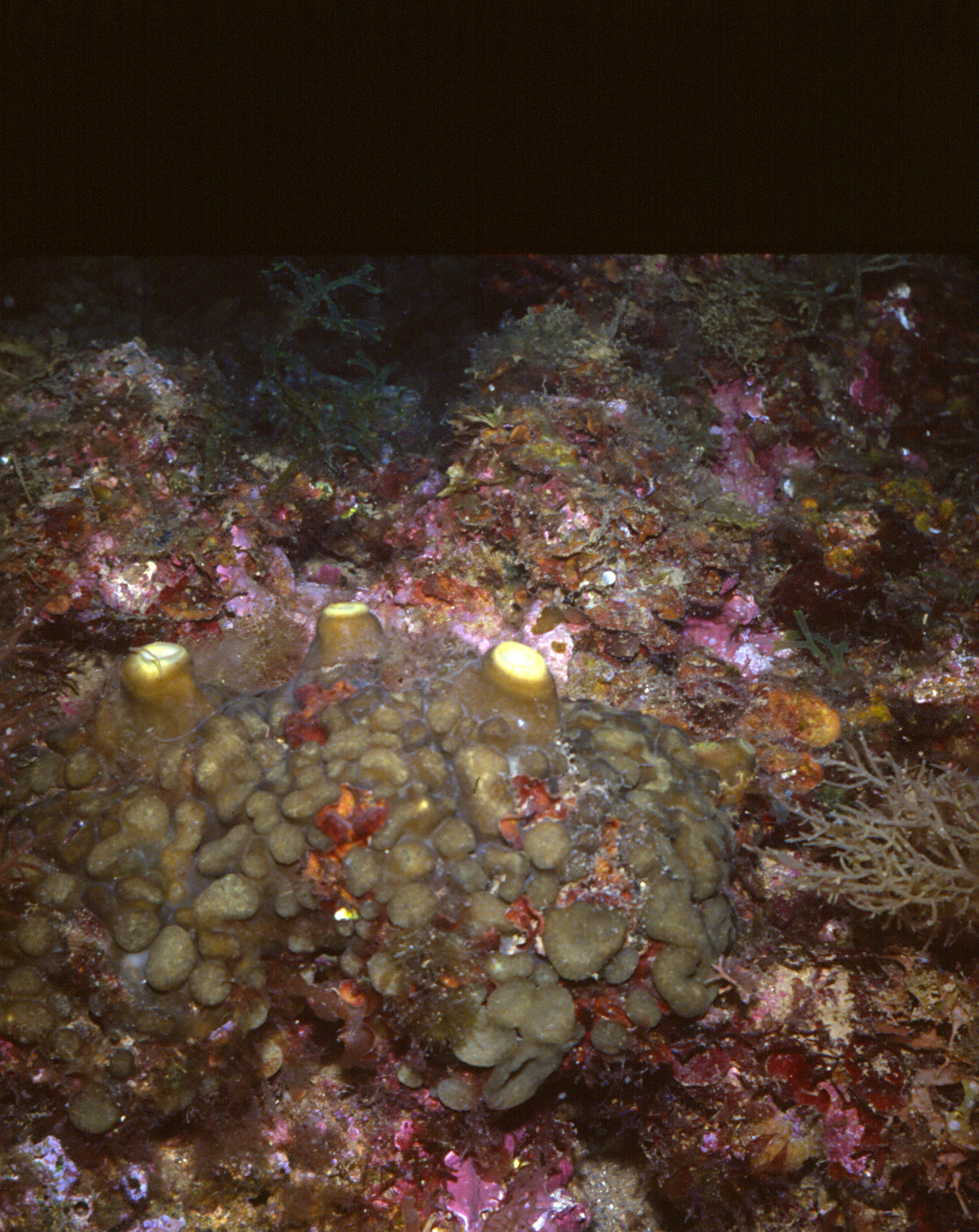

Scientific classification
- Kingdom: Animalia
- Phylum: Porifera
- Class: Demospongiae
- Order: Clionaida
- Family: Clionaidae
- Genus: Cliona
- Species: C. viridis

Binomial name
- Cliona viridis (Schmidt, 1862)

Synonyms
- List: Cliona copiosa Sarà, 1959; Cliona nigricans (Schmidt, 1862); Cliona suberea (Schmidt, 1862); Cliona tremitensis Sarà, 1961; Osculina polystomella Schmidt, 1868; Papillella suberea (Schmidt, 1862); Papillina nigricans Schmidt, 1862; Papillina suberea Schmidt, 1862; Taguilla nigricans (Schmidt, 1862); Tapiliata nigricans (Schmidt, 1862); Tapiliata suberea (Schmidt, 1862); Vioa viridis Schmidt, 1862

= Cliona viridis =

Species of sponge

Cliona viridis, commonly called the green boring sponge, is a species of demosponge in the family Clionaidae. Its form varies according to the nature of the surface on which it grows. In limestone and other calcareous substrates it excavates channels and chambers while on other types of rock it encrusts the surface or forms massive structures. It is native to the eastern Atlantic, the Mediterranean Sea and the Indo-Pacific Ocean.

== Description ==
Cliona viridis is an excavating sponge and on calcareous substrates, the mass of the sponge is largely unseen beneath the surface with just the osculi (exhalent openings) and ostioles (inhalent pores) projecting. The osculi are a few millimetres wide and are yellowish-green or light brown with pale rims. The ostioles are grouped together on flat-topped, sieve-like protuberances which may be white, yellow or brownish-green. The colour is due to the zooxanthellae which are present in the tissues. The exterior appearance of this sponge in its later growth stages is a smooth mosaic-like surface composed of a firm, tough material. Beneath this surface are galleries excavated by the sponge which are up to 2.5 mm (0.1 in) in diameter. The whole sponge may be a globose structure some 15 cm (6 in) in diameter.

== Distribution ==
Cliona viridis is found in the East Atlantic, the Azores, the Cape Verde Islands, the Mediterranean Sea and the Indian Ocean. It has also been reported from the Caribbean Sea but this may have been a misidentification. It is found in shallow water and at depths down to about 367 metres (1,204 ft), in well-lit areas and in semi-dark cave entrances. Cliona viridis is a common sponge and is the dominant species of sponge in the shallow sublittoral zone in some parts of its range. It is less frequently found in deeper water and there it largely grows on coralline algae.

== Biology ==
In the first stage of growth, Cliona viridis needs a calcified substrate on which to grow and into which it can bore. This can be limestone or a mollusc shell such as that of the edible oyster (Ostrea edulis). In its encrusting and massive stages it can grow over silicaceous rocks into which it is unable to bore. Although the tissues normally contain zooxanthellae, a photosynthetic symbiont, the sponge is not reliant on this and can grow in total darkness.

Like other sponges, Cliona viridis maintains a current of water through its structure. It draws water in through its ostioles and filters out food particles such as bacteria and other micro-organisms. During the passage of the water through the sponge, oxygen diffuses into the tissues and waste products diffuse out. The water is then expelled through the osculi.

Cliona viridis is oviparous, that is to say the eggs are fertilised internally, sperm being drawn into the interior of the sponge with the incoming water flow. The eggs are then ejected into the water column via the outgoing water stream. There is some degree of synchronisation of the reproductive process as a larval bloom was observed to take place in June during a study undertaken in the Mediterranean. The larvae are planktonic and have limited dispersal ability. When they settle on the seabed they develop into juvenile sponges in about two weeks. Zooxanthellae are already present at metamorphosis, having probably been transmitted during maturation of the oocytes.
