= Cliona californiana =

Scientific classification
- Kingdom: Animalia
- Phylum: Porifera
- Class: Demospongiae
- Order: Clionaida
- Family: Clionaidae
- Genus: Cliona
- Species: C. californiana

Binomial name
- Cliona californiana de Laubenfels, 1932

Synonyms
- Cliona celata var. californiana de Laubenfels, 1932; Pseudosuberites pseudos Dickinson, 1945

Species of sponge

Cliona californiana, the yellow boring sponge, boring sponge or sulphur sponge, is a species of demosponge belonging to the family Clionaidae. It is native to the north-eastern Pacific Ocean and burrows into the shell valves of bivalve molluscs.

== Description ==
The yellow boring sponge inhabits living bivalve molluscs, boring into the shell valves. The only parts of the sponge which are visible from the outside are small yellow patches up to 3 mm (0.1 in) in diameter, sometimes containing small oscula (openings). The sponge spicules are silicaceous (glassy) and are scattered throughout the sponge tissues. They consist entirely of megascleres known as "tylostyles", which are a kind of spicule with a single shaft, with a point on one end and a knob on the other. These characteristic spicules distinguish this sponge from any other sponge species found in the locality.

== Distribution and habitat ==
The yellow boring sponge is native to the north-eastern Pacific Ocean, its range extending from Alaska to Baja California. It is most often found in the subtidal zone but also occurs in the intertidal zone. It is more common in the colder waters in the northern part of its range than it is in the southern part, and it occurs at depths down to about 120 m (400 ft).

== Ecology ==
A newly settled young sponge makes its way to the shell of a suitable host and bores into a valve of the mollusc (or the plates of the barnacle). Its tunnelling activities weaken the shell, and scallop and oyster farmers consider the sponge to be a pest. When burrowing, it secretes acid which dissolves the shell, and then it breaks off small pieces of shell and moves them to the exterior. When it outgrows its tunnels, it spreads across the surface of the valve as a thick coating layer, and when it gets too big for its host, it becomes a free-living sponge with a length of up to 9 cm (3.5 in) and a height of 6.5 cm (2.6 in). These sponges are common growing on the thick-shelled giant rock scallop (Crassadoma gigantea) and on oysters. The sponge is preyed on by the nudibranch Doriopsilla albopunctata.
