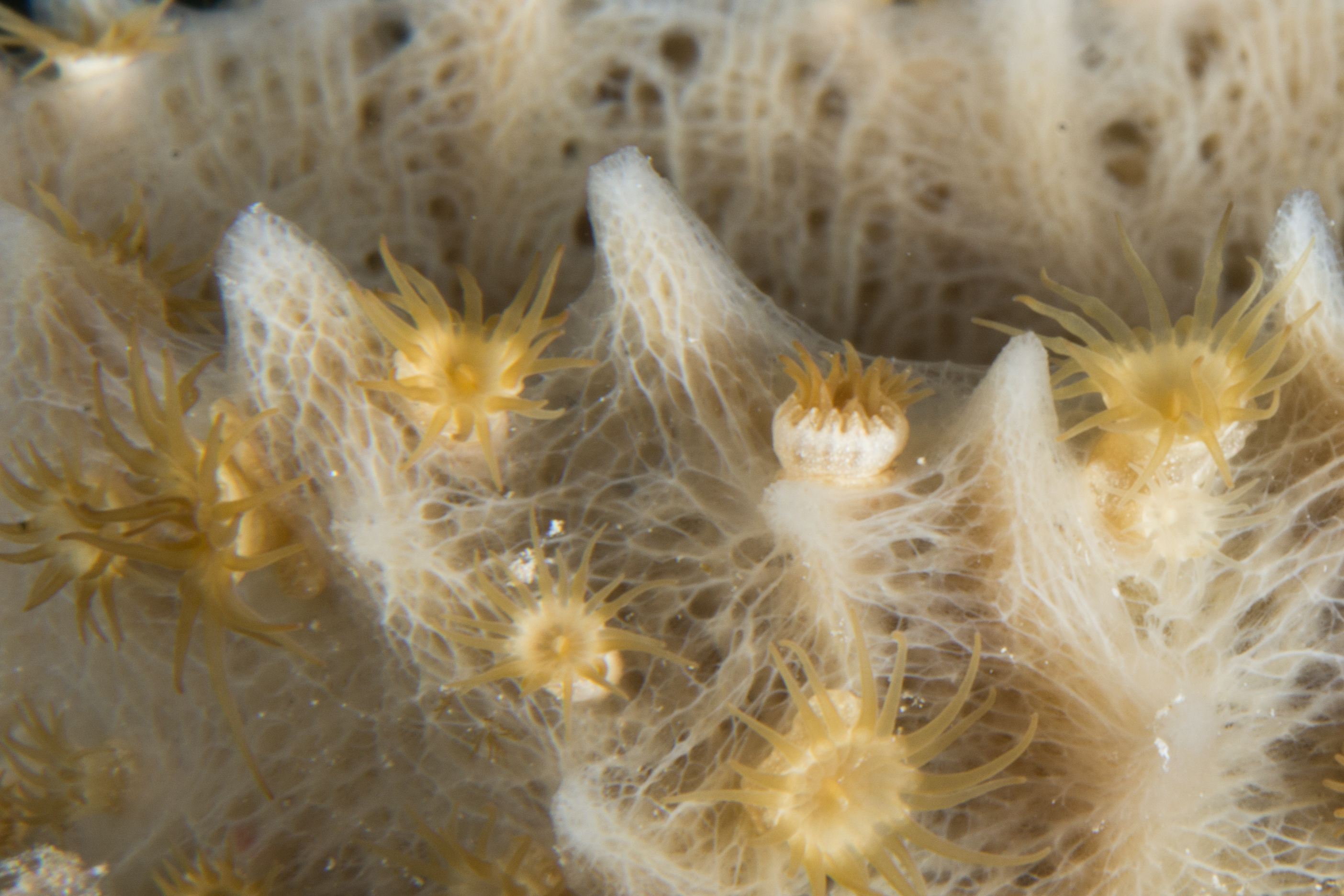

Scientific classification
- Kingdom: Animalia
- Phylum: Cnidaria
- Subphylum: Anthozoa
- Class: Hexacorallia
- Order: Zoantharia
- Family: Parazoanthidae
- Genus: Umimayanthus
- Species: U. parasiticus

Binomial name
- Umimayanthus parasiticus (Duchassaing & Michelotti, 1860)

Synonyms
- Parazoanthus parasiticus (Duchassaing de Fonbressin & Michelotti, 1860)

= Umimayanthus parasiticus =

Species of coral

Umimayanthus parasiticus, commonly known as the sponge zoanthid, is a species of coral in the order Zoantharia which grows symbiotically on several species of sponge. It is found in shallow waters in the Caribbean Sea and the Gulf of Mexico.

== Description ==
The polyps of Umimayanthus parasiticus superficially resemble rather small sea anemones. They grow either singly or in small groups of two or three on the surface of certain species of sponge. The polyps are joined by a thin layer of tissue called coenenchyme and occur at densities of 3 to 10 per square centimetre (20 to 60 per square inch). The distances between the polyps widens as they spread out over the surface of the host sponge by budding. The polyp's column is encrusted with sand particles and calcareous material and is white. The oral disc is up to 6 millimetres (0.24 in) in diameter and there are two rings of tentacles round the edge with about 14 tentacles in each. These are brown and contain symbiotic zooxanthellae, unicellular photosynthetic algae which supply the polyp with nutrients while benefiting from its nitrogenous waste.

== Distribution and habitat ==
Umimayanthus parasiticus is found in the Caribbean Sea, the Gulf of Mexico, Florida, Bermuda and the Bahamas at depths varying from 7.5 to 30 metres (25 to 98 ft). It is common where its host sponges are found. These include Cliona deletrix and other Cliona spp., Gelloides ramosa, Callyspongia vaginalis and Spheciospongia spp..

== Biology ==
Like other corals, the polyps of Umimayanthus parasiticus extend their tentacles to feed on zooplankton. It is probable that the coral benefits from the flow of water into and out of the sponge which increases the number of food particles coming within its reach. The sponge is a filter feeder and feeds on the bacteria and dissolved organic matter it removes from the water passing through its tissues. The presence of the coral obstructs the inflow of water. Some sponges produce anti-fouling compounds which they release into the surrounding water to try to prevent other organisms colonizing their surface. Nevertheless, an ongoing study of sponges colonized by zoanthid corals showed positive benefits to the sponge in growth and survival rates so the association seems to be mutualistic.

The sexes are separate in Umimayanthus parasiticus. Oocytes start developing in February and become mature when the water temperature rises to about 27 °C (81 °F) in July. Spawning takes place precisely two nights after the full moon during the next three months, with the main spawning event taking place in September. The eggs are shed singly and contain no zooxanthellae and fertilisation occurs in the water column. Little is known of the development of the larvae.
