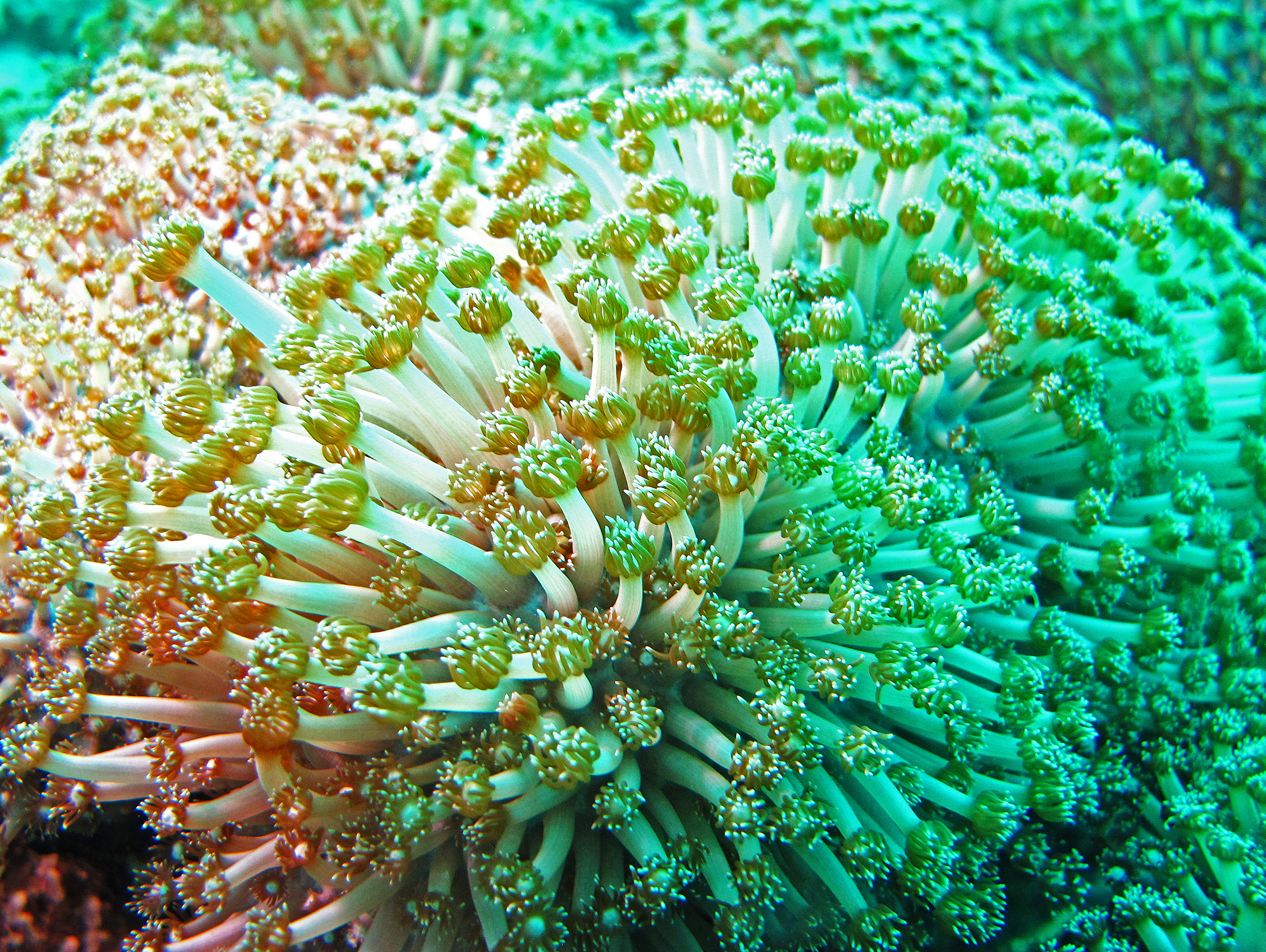

Conservation status
- Least Concern (IUCN 3.1)

Scientific classification
- Kingdom: Animalia
- Phylum: Cnidaria
- Subphylum: Anthozoa
- Class: Hexacorallia
- Order: Scleractinia
- Family: Poritidae
- Genus: Goniopora
- Species: G. columna

Binomial name
- Goniopora columna Dana, 1846

Synonyms
- Goniopora undalata Nemenzo, 1955

= Goniopora columna =

Species of coral

Goniopora columna is a species of colonial stony coral in the family Poritidae.

== Distribution ==
This species is native to the western and eastern Indian Ocean and the western Pacific Ocean, including the Red Sea, the Gulf of Aden, the Persian Gulf, Australia, South-east Asia, Japan and East China Sea.

It can be found in Australia, Bahrain, Cambodia, China, Comoros, Djibouti, Egypt, Eritrea, Fiji, Guam, India, Indonesia, Iran, Iraq, Israel, Japan, Jordan, Kuwait, Madagascar, Malaysia, Maldives, Marshall Islands, Mauritius, Micronesia, Mozambique. Myanmar, New Caledonia, Mariana Islands, Oman, Pakistan, Palau, Papua New Guinea, Philippines, Qatar, Réunion, Saudi Arabia, Seychelles, Singapore, Solomon Islands, Somalia, Sri Lanka, Sudan, Taiwan, Thailand, United Arab Emirates, Viet Nam and Yemen.

== Habitat ==
This reef-associated species occurs in tropical shallow waters and in sheltered, sandy or lagoon environments, at depths of 2 to 15 m. It may also occur in turbid waters. The International Union for Conservation of Nature has assessed its conservation status as being "Near Threatened". These corals appear moderately susceptible to bleaching, especially in turbid waters, which can help to protect them.

== Description ==
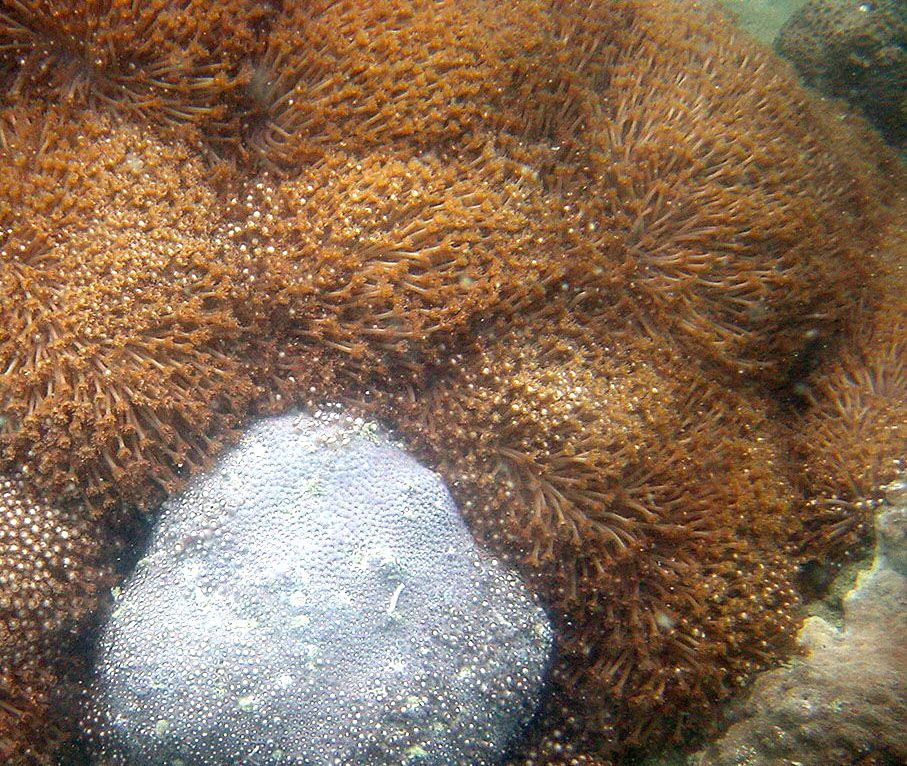
Colonies of Goniopora columna in Thailandia

This species develops hemispherical or irregular columnar mound shaped colonies with a neat appearance and dead basal parts. The color of the polips may be yellow, brown or green, usually with different color in the oral discs.

The diameter of the small and rounded calices ranges from about 3–5 mm (0.12–0.20 in), with a uniform bundle of tentacles. The columellae are rather large and long. The living polyps can reach a length up to 10 cm (3.9 in).

This species is quite similar to Goniopora stokesi and Goniopora lobata. It differs from the other two especially for the columnar shape of the colonies and for the large light-colored oral disc.

== Biology ==
Like most corals, Goniopora columna reproduce asexually. They usually feed on plankton. Mature gametes are spawned through the mouth. The zygote develops into a planktonic planula larva.
