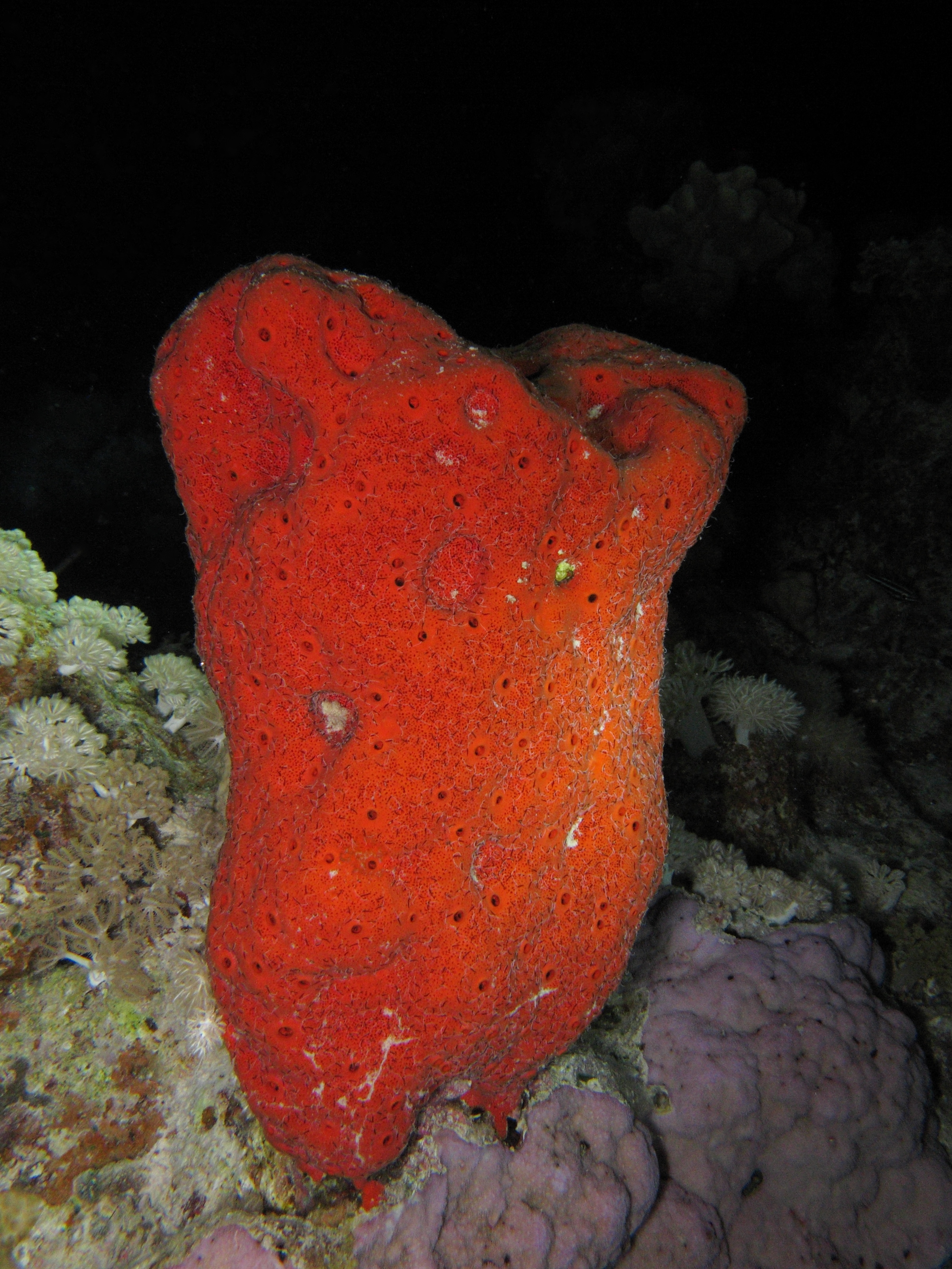

Scientific classification
- Domain: Eukaryota
- Kingdom: Animalia
- Phylum: Porifera
- Class: Demospongiae
- Order: Clionaida
- Family: Clionaidae
- Genus: Pione
- Species: P. vastifica

Binomial name
- Pione vastifica Hancock, 1849

Synonyms
- List: Archaeocliona pontica Czerniavsky, 1878; Cliona pontica Czerniavsky, 1880; Cliona canadensis Hancock, 1849; Cliona corallinoides Hancock, 1849; Cliona gracilis Hancock, 1849; Cliona northumbrica Hancock, 1849; Cliona pontica Czerniavsky, 1878; Cliona vastifica Hancock, 1849; Pione canadensis (Hancock, 1849); Pione corallinoides (Hancock, 1849); Vioa grantii Schmidt, 1862; Vioa incarnata Uljanin, 1872; Vioa vastifica (Hancock, 1849)

= Pione vastifica =

Red boring sponge

Species of sponge

Pione vastifica, commonly known as red boring sponge, is a species of sponge found from the Red Sea to western Pacific Ocean. It can grow up to 1 metre (3.3 ft) in size and bore 5 centimetres (2.0 in) into coralline substrate.
