= Willardia caicosensis =

Scientific classification
- Kingdom: Animalia
- Phylum: Porifera
- Class: Demospongiae
- Order: Clionaida
- Family: Acanthochaetetidae
- Genus: Willardia
- Species: W. caicosensis

Binomial name
- Willardia caicosensis Willenz & Pomponi, 1996

Species of sponge

Willardia caicosensis is a species of deep sea sclerosponge (coralline sponge) from the Turks and Caicos Islands. It was first described by Philippe Willenz of the Institut Royal des Sciences Naturelles de Belgique in Brussels, Belgium and Shirley Pomponi, now of the Harbor Branch Oceanographic Institution at Florida Atlantic University.
