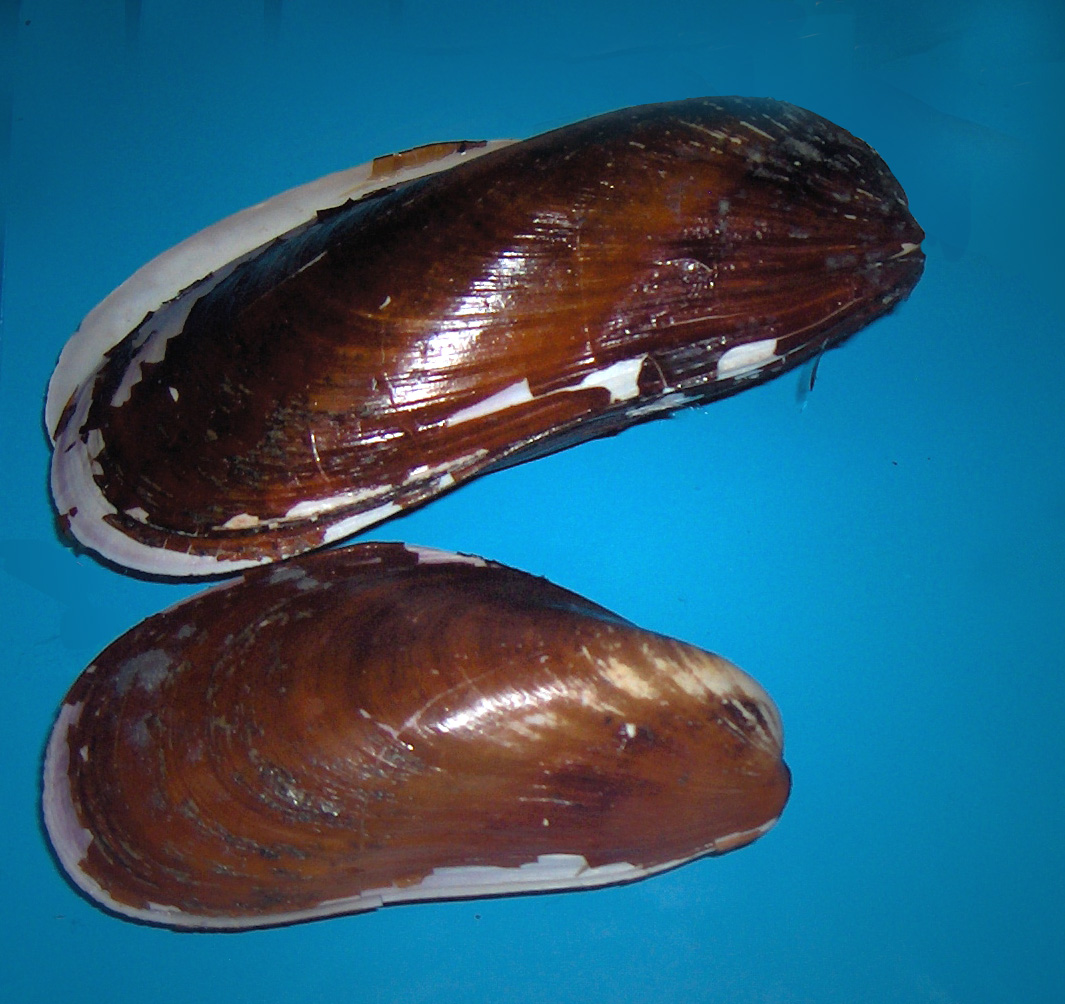
- Right valve of a Modiolus modiolus

Scientific classification
- Kingdom: Animalia
- Phylum: Mollusca
- Class: Bivalvia
- Order: Mytilida
- Family: Modiolidae
- Genus: Modiolus
- Species: M. modiolus

Binomial name
- Modiolus modiolus (Linnaeus, 1758)

= Modiolus modiolus =

Species of bivalve

Modiolus modiolus, common name northern horsemussel (Scottish Gaelic: clabaidh-dubh, Scots: clabbydoo), is a species of marine bivalve mollusk in the family Mytilidae.

== Nomenclature ==
In Scottish Gaelic, the species is called 'clabaidh-dubha' ('clabby doos'), meaning 'big black mouths'. More recently in Scotland the species is commonly known and referred to as 'clappy-doo'. In the Shetland dialect, they are known as "yoags".

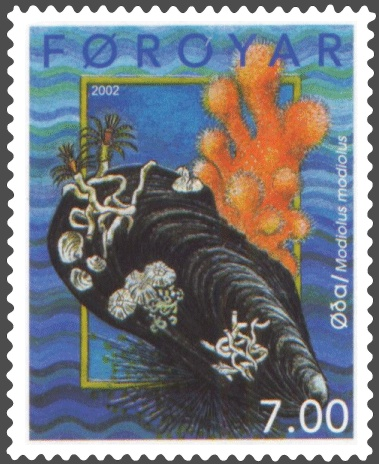
Modiolus modiolus at stamp of Faroe Islands by Postverk Føroya.

== Description ==
Modiolus modiolus is a large mussel growing to 22 cm (9ins) long though 10 cm (4ins) is a more typical size. The shell is purplish or dark blue and robust, with horny protuberances when young. The two valves are roughly triangular or bluntly oblong with rounded umbones near the anterior end. The annual growth lines are clear and there is a fine sculpturing of concentric grooves and ridges. The interior of the shell is white with a broad pallial line, large anterior adductor muscle scar and smaller posterior adductor muscle scar. The body is deep orange and the mantle is unfrilled. The shell is firmly attached to the substrate by byssus threads.

Right and left valve of the same specimen:

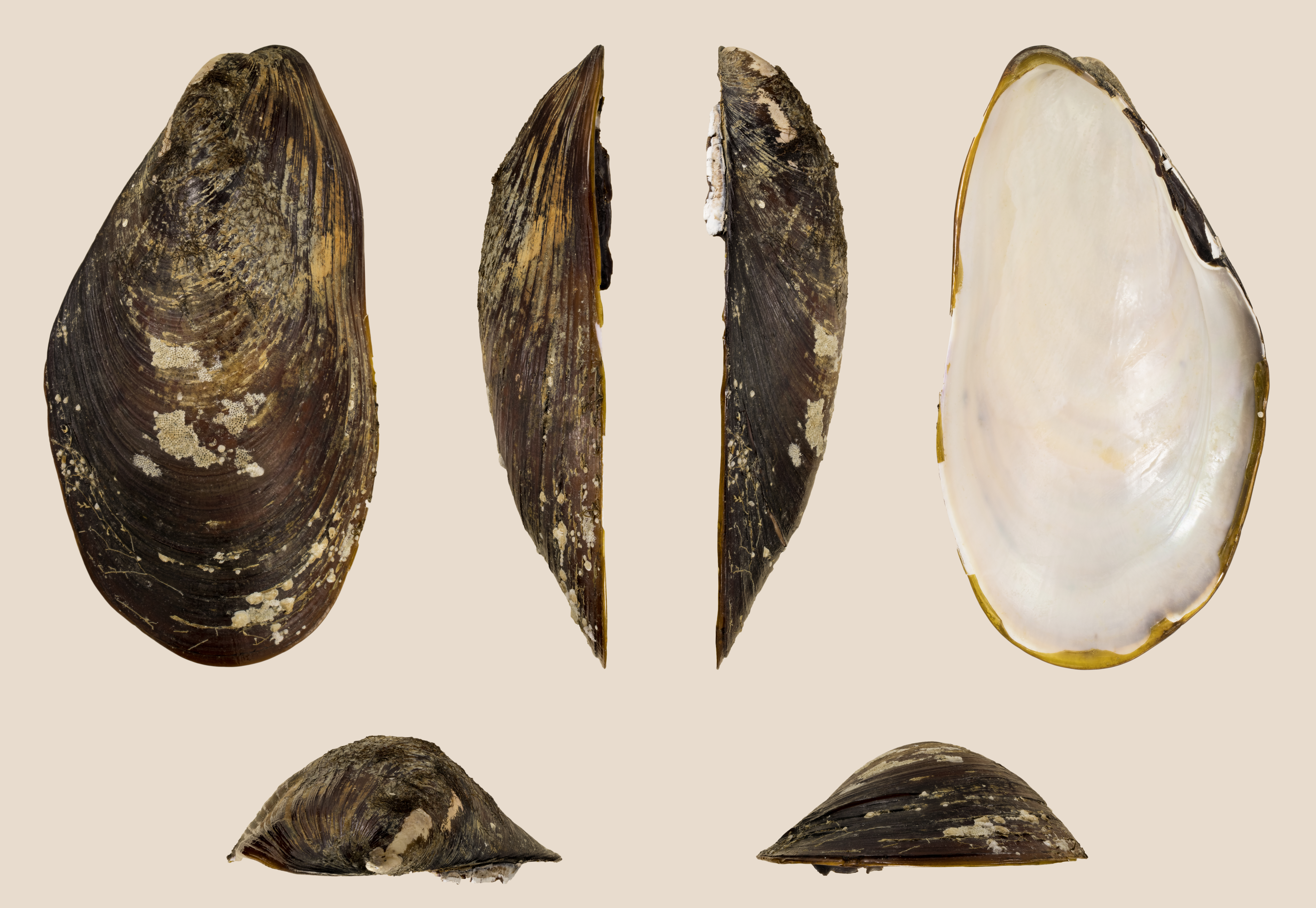
Right valve

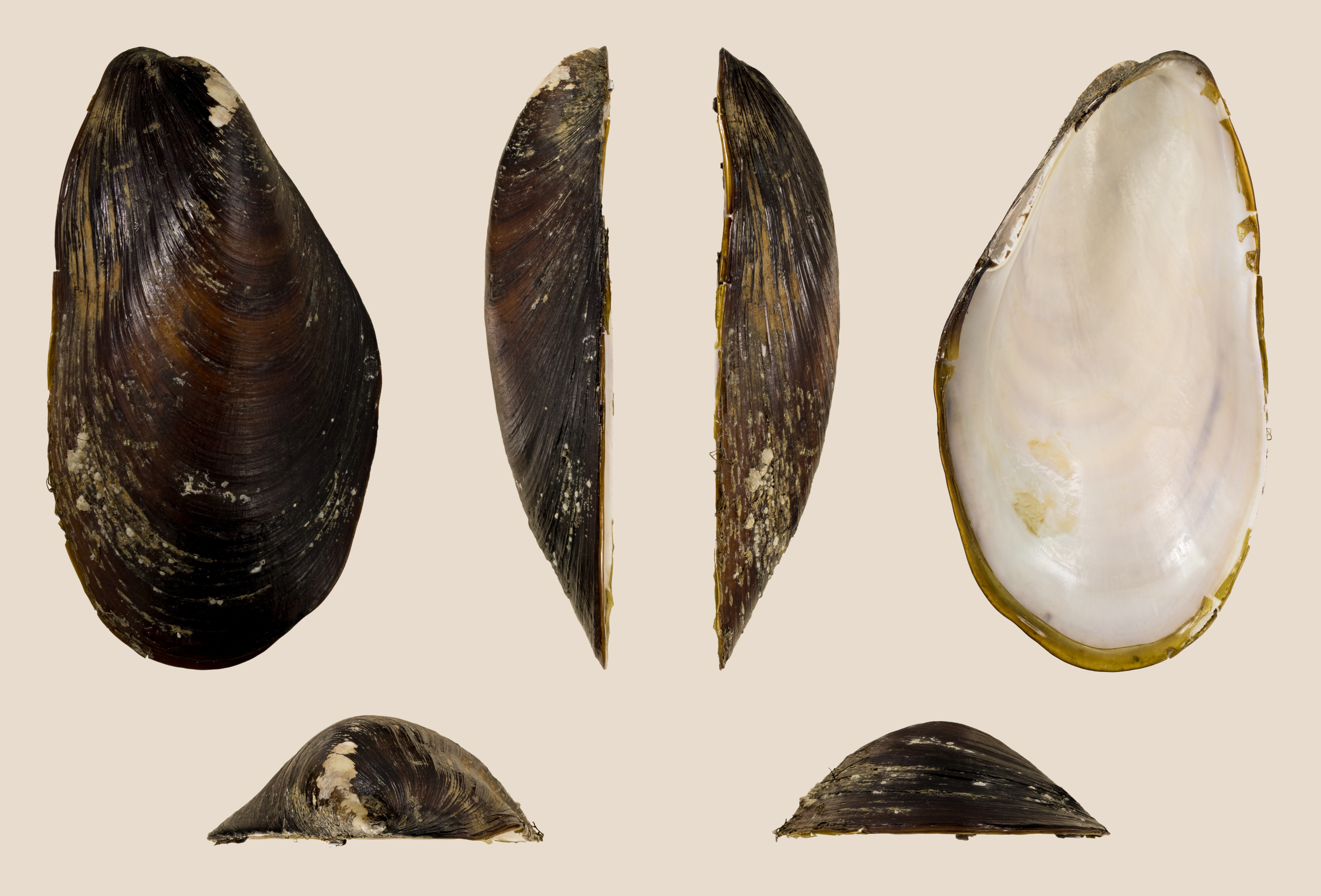
Left valve

== Distribution ==
M. modiolus can be found along the Atlantic coast of North America, from the Arctic Ocean to Florida, and along the Pacific coast, from the Arctic Ocean to California. It is also found on the European seaboard of the Atlantic Ocean from the United Kingdom northwards. It is found from low tide mark to depths of 50 metres in British waters and 80 metres off the coast of Nova Scotia. The largest horse mussel bed in Scotland is near Noss Head in Caithness. While it is also found in the Baltic Sea, it has become a vulnerable species there.

== Ecology ==
M. modiolus is found growing on hard substrates including shells and stones and the byssus threads of other mussels. Survival rates of young individuals are low but by the time they reach about 4 cm long, at an age of 4 years, individuals are too large and tough to be predated upon by starfish such as Asterias rubens, the whelk Buccinum undatum and crabs. Juveniles growing on byssus threads are more likely to survive than free living individuals and this results in the formation of cold-water reefs of mussels. These mostly occur in locations with fairly strong currents. The species is tolerant of low levels of oxygen and of a diminished quantity of the phytoplankton on which they feed. The boring sponge Cliona celata sometimes damages the shells of older individuals.
