= Acanthochaetetidae =

Scientific classification
- Kingdom: Animalia
- Phylum: Porifera
- Class: Demospongiae
- Order: Clionaida
- Family: Acanthochaetetidae (Fischer, 1970)

Genera
- See text.

Family of sponges

Acanthochaetetidae is a family of sponges belonging to the order Clionaida. It is largely extinct, but contains two extant genera, each of which are represented by single extant species.

== Description ==
This family contains sclerosponges (corraline sponges) with a massive calcareous skeleton. This skeleton attaches individuals to their substrate. Living tissue coats the outermost layer of the basal skeleton. The megascleres include tylostyles (pointed at one end and a knob at the other). They are common and point outwards. The microscleres are relatively large streptasters (modified aster in which the rays radiate from an axis instead of meeting at a common center). The siliceous spicules suggest close ties to Spirastrella and Diplastrella but morphological differences between the spicules the presence of an elaborately structured calcareous basal skeleton justifies the distinction of Acanthochaetetidae from Spirastrellidae.

== Genera ==
The following genera are recognised:

- Acanthochaetetes (Fischer, 1970)
- Septochaetetes (Rios & Almela, 1944)†
- Willardia (Willenz & Pomponi, 1996)
