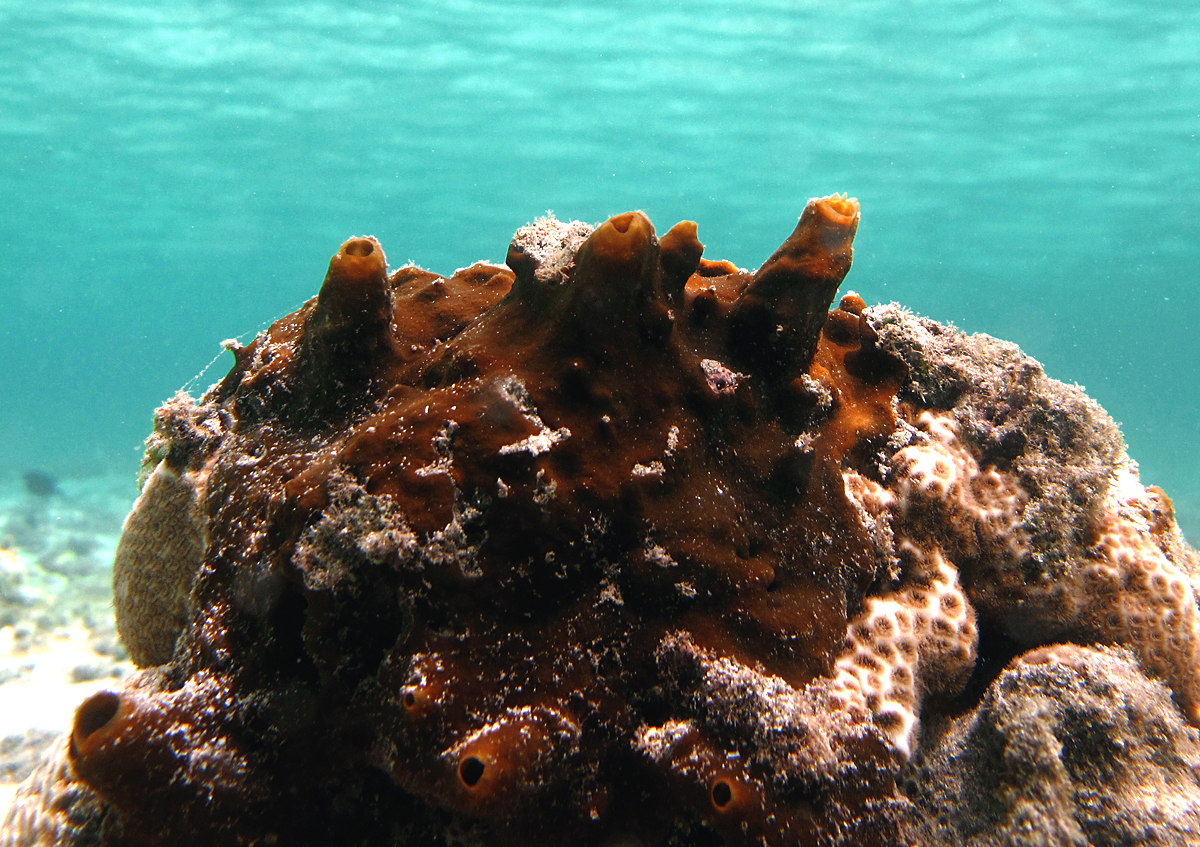
- Spheciospongia vagabunda

Scientific classification
- Domain: Eukaryota
- Kingdom: Animalia
- Phylum: Porifera
- Class: Demospongiae
- Order: Clionaida
- Family: Clionaidae
- Genus: Spheciospongia; Marshall, 1892

= Spheciospongia =

Genus of sponges

Spheciospongia is a genus of sponges belonging to the family Clionaidae.

The species of this genus are found in Southern Hemisphere.

Species:

- Spheciospongia albida (Carter, 1886)
- Spheciospongia alcyonoides (Hallmann, 1912)
- Spheciospongia areolata (Dendy, 1897)
- Spheciospongia australis (Lendenfeld, 1888)
- Spheciospongia capensis (Carter, 1882)
- Spheciospongia carnosa (Topsent, 1897)
- Spheciospongia confoederata Laubenfels, 1930
- Spheciospongia congenera (Ridley, 1884)
- Spheciospongia digitata (Hentschel, 1909)
- Spheciospongia excentrica (Burton, 1931)
- Spheciospongia florida (Lendenfeld, 1897)
- Spheciospongia globularis (Dendy, 1922)
- Spheciospongia inconstans (Dendy, 1887)
- Spheciospongia incrustans Carballo, Cruz-Barraza & Gómez, 2004
- Spheciospongia lacunosa (Kieschnick, 1898)
- Spheciospongia massa (Ridley & Dendy, 1886)
- Spheciospongia mastoidea (Keller, 1891)
- Spheciospongia montiformis (Hallmann, 1912)
- Spheciospongia ndabazithe Samaai, Pillay & Janson, 2019
- Spheciospongia panis (Thiele, 1898)
- Spheciospongia papillosa (Ridley & Dendy, 1886)
- Spheciospongia peleia (de Laubenfels, 1954)
- Spheciospongia poculoides (Hallmann, 1912)
- Spheciospongia potamophera (de Laubenfels, 1954)
- Spheciospongia poterionides (Vacelet & Vasseur, 1971)
- Spheciospongia purpurea (Lamarck, 1815)
- Spheciospongia ramulosa (Lendenfeld, 1888)
- Spheciospongia robusta (Carter, 1886)
- Spheciospongia rotunda (Tanita & Hoshino, 1989)
- Spheciospongia ruetzleri Carballo, Cruz-Barraza & Gómez, 2004
- Spheciospongia semilunaris (Lindgren, 1897)
- Spheciospongia solida (Ridley & Dendy, 1886)
- Spheciospongia spiculifera (Kieschnick, 1898)
- Spheciospongia symbiotica Hechtel, 1983
- Spheciospongia tentorioides (Dendy, 1905)
- Spheciospongia transitoria (Ridley, 1884)
- Spheciospongia vagabunda (Ridley, 1884)
- Spheciospongia vesparium (Lamarck, 1815)
