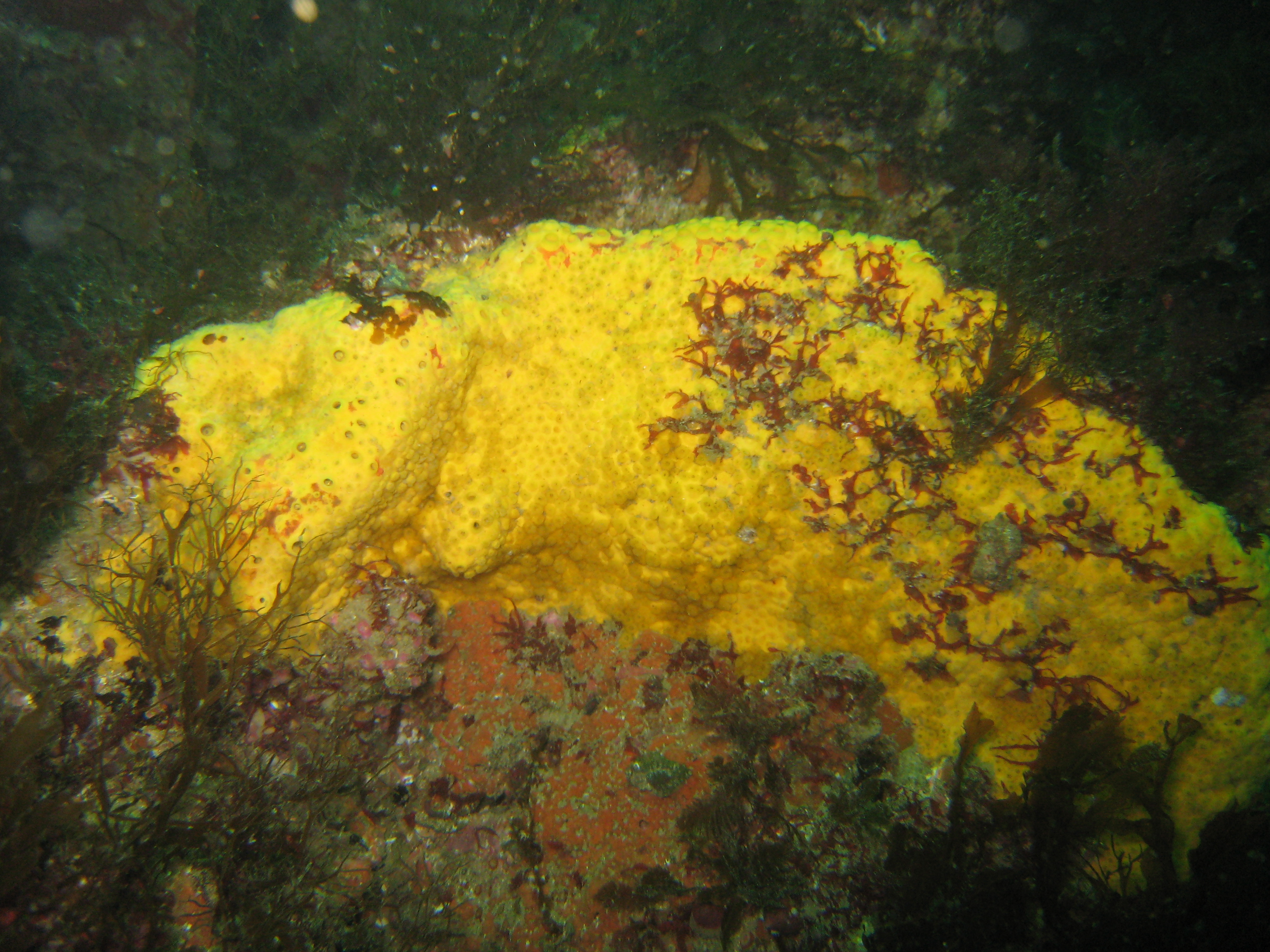
- Cliona celeta

Scientific classification
- Kingdom: Animalia
- Phylum: Porifera
- Class: Demospongiae
- Order: Clionaida
- Family: Clionaidae
- Genus: Cliona; Grant, 1826

Species
- See text

Synonyms
- List: Anthosigmella Topsent, 1918; Bernatia Rosell & Uriz, 1997; Delaubenfelsia Dickinson, 1945; Euryphylle Duchassaing & Michelotti, 1864; Idomon Gray, 1867; Osculina Schmidt, 1868; Papillella Vosmaer, 1885; Papillina Schmidt, 1862; Poterion Schlegel, 1858; Pronax Gray, 1867; Raphyrus Bowerbank, 1862; Rhaphiophora Gray, 1867; Rhaphyrus Bowerbank, 1864; Sapline Gray, 1867; Spongia (Poterion) Schlegel, 1858; Taguilla Bowerbank, 1874; Tapiliata Bowerbank, 1874; Vioa Nardo, 1839

= Cliona =

Genus of sponges

Cliona is a genus of demosponges in the family Clionaidae. It contains about eighty described species.

== Species ==
Species in this genus include:

- Cliona acephala Zea & López-Victoria, 2016
- Cliona adriatica Calcinai, Bavestrello, Cuttone & Cerrano, 2011
- Cliona aethiopicus Burton, 1932
- Cliona albimarginata Calcinai, Bavestrello & Cerrano, 2005
- Cliona amplicavata Rützler, 1974
- Cliona annulifera Annandale, 1915
- Cliona aprica Pang, 1973
- Cliona argus Thiele, 1898
- Cliona barbadensis Holmes, 2000
- Cliona burtoni Topsent, 1932
- Cliona caesia (Schönberg, 2000)
- Cliona caledoniae van Soest & Beglinger, 2009
- Cliona californiana de Laubenfels, 1932
- Cliona caribbaea Carter, 1882
- Cliona carteri (Ridley, 1881)
- Cliona celata Grant, 1826
- Cliona chilensis Thiele, 1905
- Cliona delitrix Pang, 1973
- Cliona desimoni Bavestrello, Calcinai & Sarà, 1995
- Cliona dioryssa (de Laubenfels, 1950)
- Cliona dissimilis Ridley & Dendy, 1886
- Cliona diversityla Sarà, 1978
- Cliona dubbia (Duchassaing & Michelotti, 1864)
- Cliona ecaudis Topsent, 1932
- Cliona ensifera Sollas, 1878
- Cliona euryphylle Topsent, 1888
- Cliona favus Calcinai, Bavestrello & Cerrano, 2005
- Cliona flavifodina Rützler, 1974
- Cliona infrafoliata (Thiele, 1898)
- Cliona insidiosa Hancock, 1849
- Cliona janitrix Topsent, 1932
- Cliona johannae Topsent, 1932
- Cliona johnstoni (Carter, 1886)
- Cliona jullieni Topsent, 1891
- Cliona kempi Annandale, 1915
- Cliona labiata (Keller, 1880)
- Cliona langae Pang, 1973
- Cliona latens (Duchassaing & Michelotti, 1864)
- Cliona laticavicola Pang, 1973
- Cliona lesueuri Topsent, 1888
- Cliona liangae Calcinai, Bavestrello & Cerrano, 2005
- Cliona lisa Cuartas, 1991
- Cliona lobata Hancock, 1849
- Cliona macgeachi Holmes, 2000
- Cliona medinae Cruz-Barraza, Carballo, Bautista-Guerrero & Nava, 2011
- Cliona michelini Topsent, 1887
- Cliona microstrongylata Carballo & Cruz-Barra, 2005
- Cliona millepunctata Hancock, 1849
- Cliona minuscula Schönberg, Grass & Heiermann, 2006
- Cliona mucronata Sollas, 1878
- Cliona nodulosa Calcinai, Cerrano, Sarà & Bavestrello, 2000
- Cliona orientalis Thiele, 1900
- Cliona papillae Carballo, Cruz-Barra & Gomez, 2004
- Cliona parenzani Corriero & Scalera-Liaci, 1997
- Cliona patera (Hardwicke, 1822)
- Cliona paucispina Rützler, 1974
- Cliona peponacea Pang, 1973
- Cliona phallica Leidy, 1889
- Cliona pocillopora Bautista-Guerrero, Carballo, Cruz-Barraza & Nava, 2006
- Cliona radiata Hancock, 1849
- Cliona raphida Boury-Esnault, 1973
- Cliona raromicrosclera (Dickinson, 1945)
- Cliona reticulata Ise & Fujita, 2005
- Cliona rhodensis Rützler & Bromley, 1981
- Cliona schmidti (Ridley, 1881)
- Cliona spissaspira Corriero & Nonnis Marzano, 2006
- Cliona subulata Sollas, 1878
- Cliona tenuis Zea & Weil, 2003
- Cliona thomasi Mote, Schönberg, Samaai, Gupta, Ingole, 2019
- Cliona thoosina Topsent, 1888
- Cliona tinctoria Schönberg, 2000
- Cliona topsenti (Lendenfeld, 1897)
- Cliona tropicalis Cruz-Barraza, Carballo, Bautista-Guerrero & Nava, 2011
- Cliona tumula Friday, Poppell & Hill, 2013
- Cliona undulata (George & Wilson, 1919)
- Cliona utricularis Calcinai, Bavestrello & Cerrano, 2005
- Cliona valentis (de Laubenfels, 1957)
- Cliona vallartense Carballo, Cruz-Barraza & Gomez, 2004
- Cliona varians (Duchassaing & Michelotti, 1864)
- Cliona vermifera Hancock, 1867
- Cliona viridis (Schmidt, 1862)
