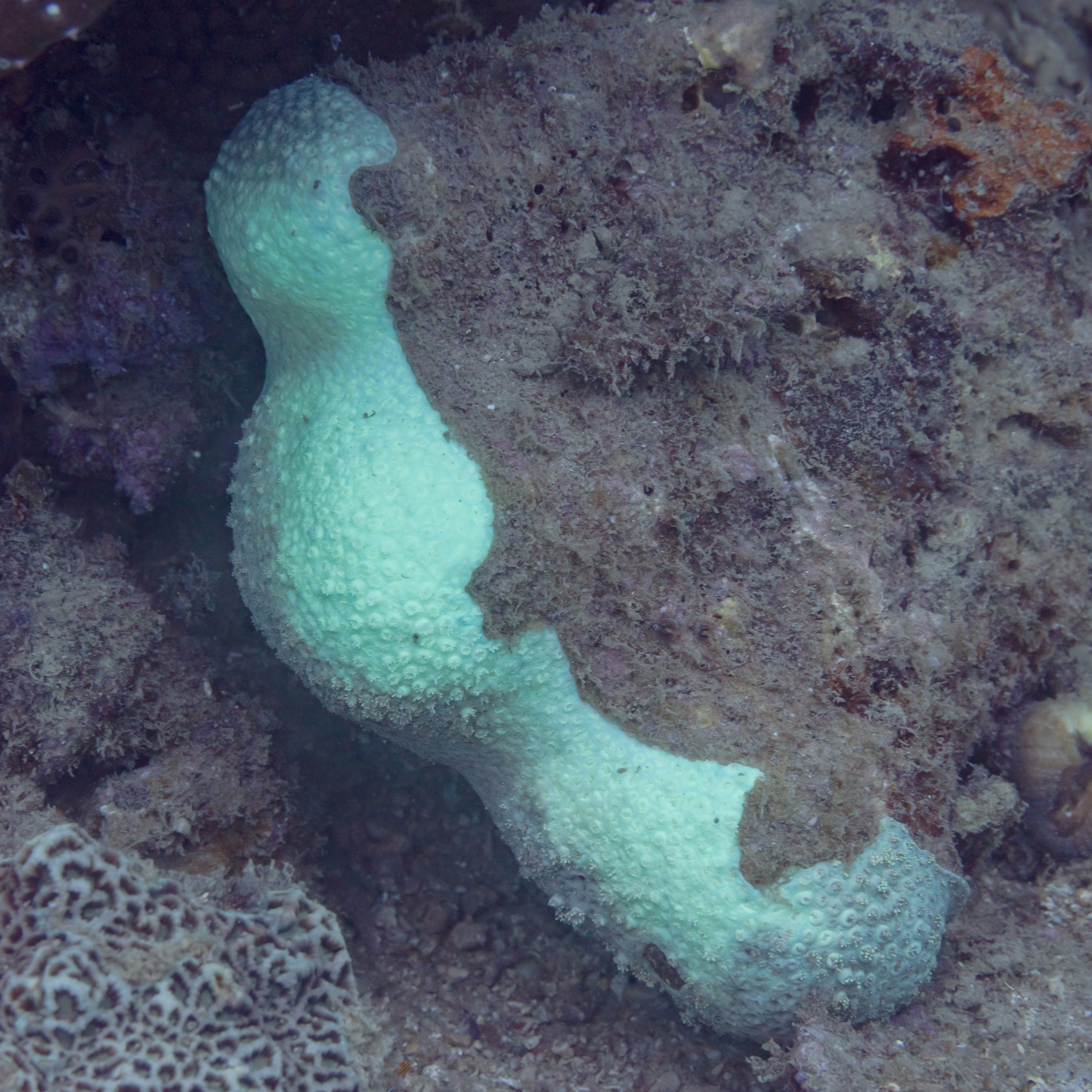

Conservation status
- Least Concern (IUCN 3.1)

Scientific classification
- Kingdom: Animalia
- Phylum: Cnidaria
- Subphylum: Anthozoa
- Class: Hexacorallia
- Order: Scleractinia
- Family: Poritidae
- Genus: Goniopora
- Species: G. tenuidens

Binomial name
- Goniopora tenuidens (Quelch, 1886)

Synonyms
- Rhodaraea tenuidens Quelch, 1886

= Goniopora tenuidens =

Species of coral

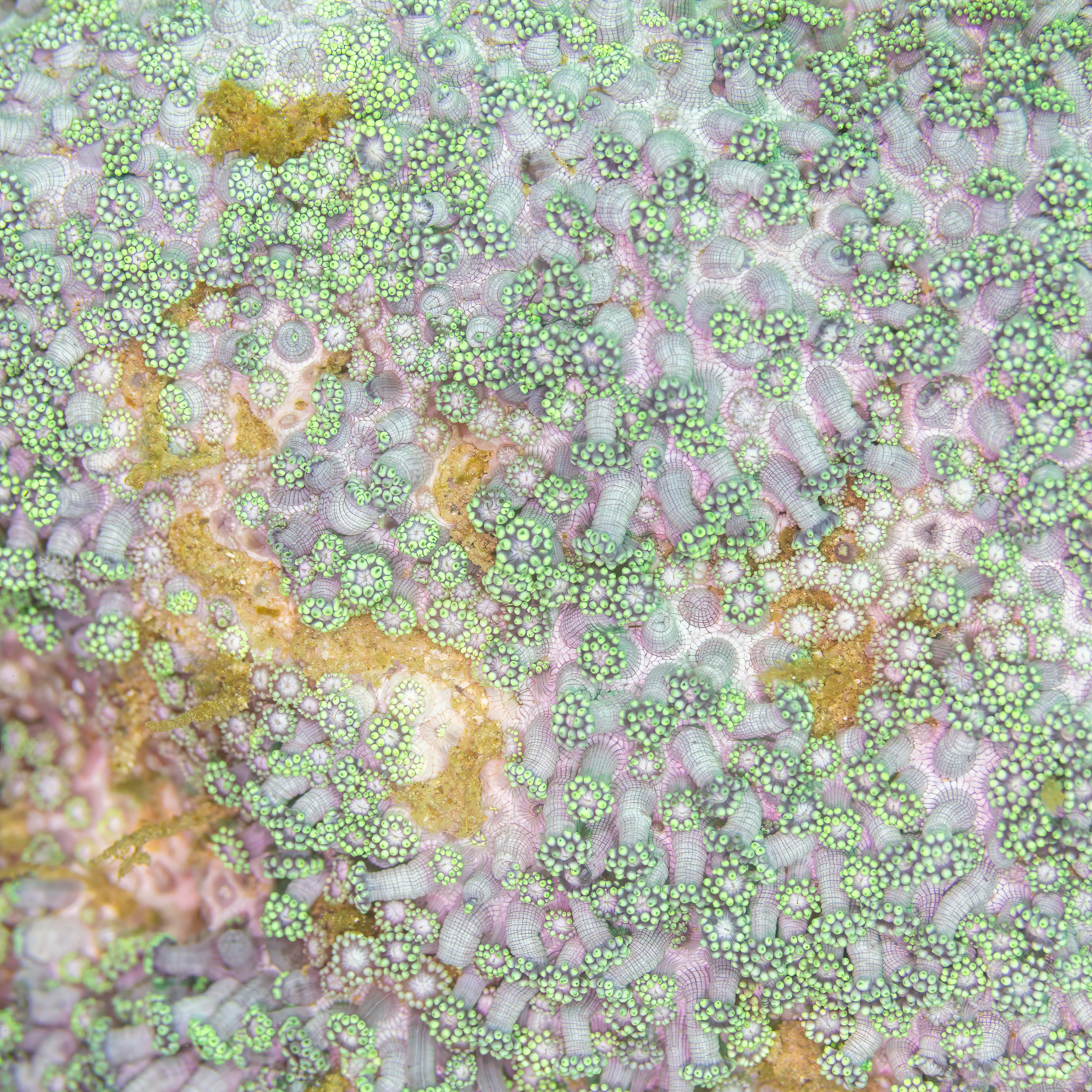
Detail view

Goniopora tenuidens is a species of colonial stony coral in the family Poritidae. It occurs in shallow water in the tropical Indo-Pacific region. The International Union for Conservation of Nature has assessed its conservation status as being of "least concern".

== Description ==
Colonies of this species form solid hemispherical or irregular mounds. The corallites (the stony cups in which the polyps sit) are small and rounded, each having six palliform lobes (stony blades) on their inner margins. The polyps are of a distinctive appearance being of regular length and topped with a uniform bundle of tentacles. The colour of this coral may be bluish, green or brown and the tentacles may be tipped with white.

== Distribution and habitat ==
Goniopora tenuidens is native to the tropical Indian Ocean and the western Pacific Ocean. Its range extends from Madagascar, the Red Sea and the Gulf of Aden, through the western, central and eastern Indian Ocean to southeastern Asia, Indonesia, Japan and the South China Sea, northern and eastern Australia and island groups in the western Pacific Ocean. It is found subtidally in various reef habitats and in lagoons, at depths down to about 30 m (100 ft).

== Ecology ==
Goniopora tenuidens is one of several species of corals that are bioeroded by the sponge Cliona orientalis, which tunnels into its skeletal structure.

== Status ==
This is a common species of coral with a wide range and a presumed large total population. It is more resistant than many corals to bleaching and coral diseases. The main threat faced by corals is destruction of their reef habitats, through climate change, with increased incidence of severe storms, and ocean acidification. Despite corals in the genus Goniopora often being collected for the aquarium trade, the International Union for Conservation of Nature has assessed the conservation status of this species as being of "least concern".
