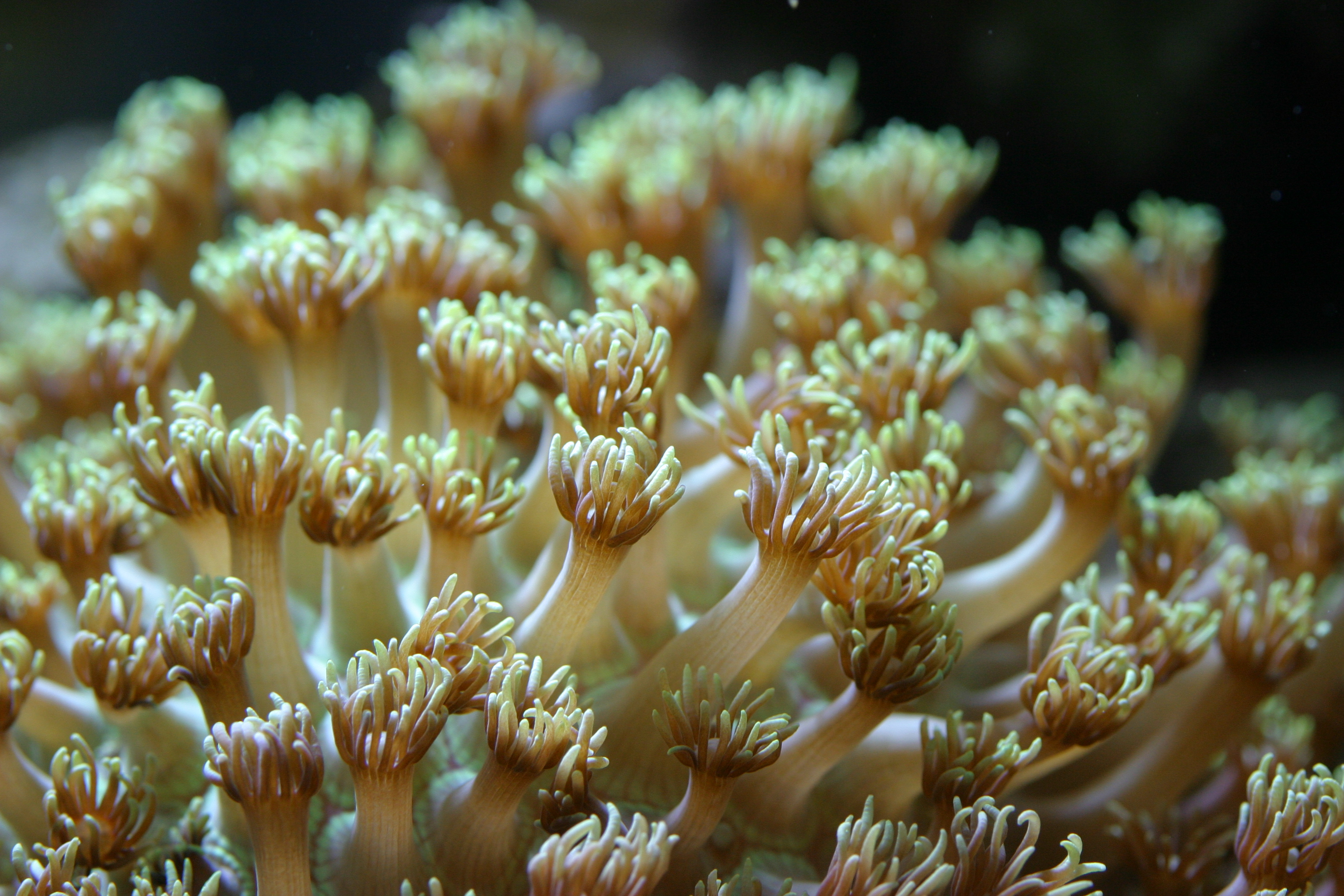

Scientific classification
- Kingdom: Animalia
- Phylum: Cnidaria
- Subphylum: Anthozoa
- Class: Hexacorallia
- Order: Scleractinia
- Family: Poritidae
- Genus: Goniopora; Blainville, 1830

Synonyms
- List: Calathiscus Claereboudt & Al-Amri, 2004; Litharaea Blainville, 1830; Machadoporites Nemésio, 2005; Poritipora Veron, 2000; Rhodaraea Milne Edwards & Haime, 1849; Tichopora Quelch, 1886

= Goniopora =

Genus of corals

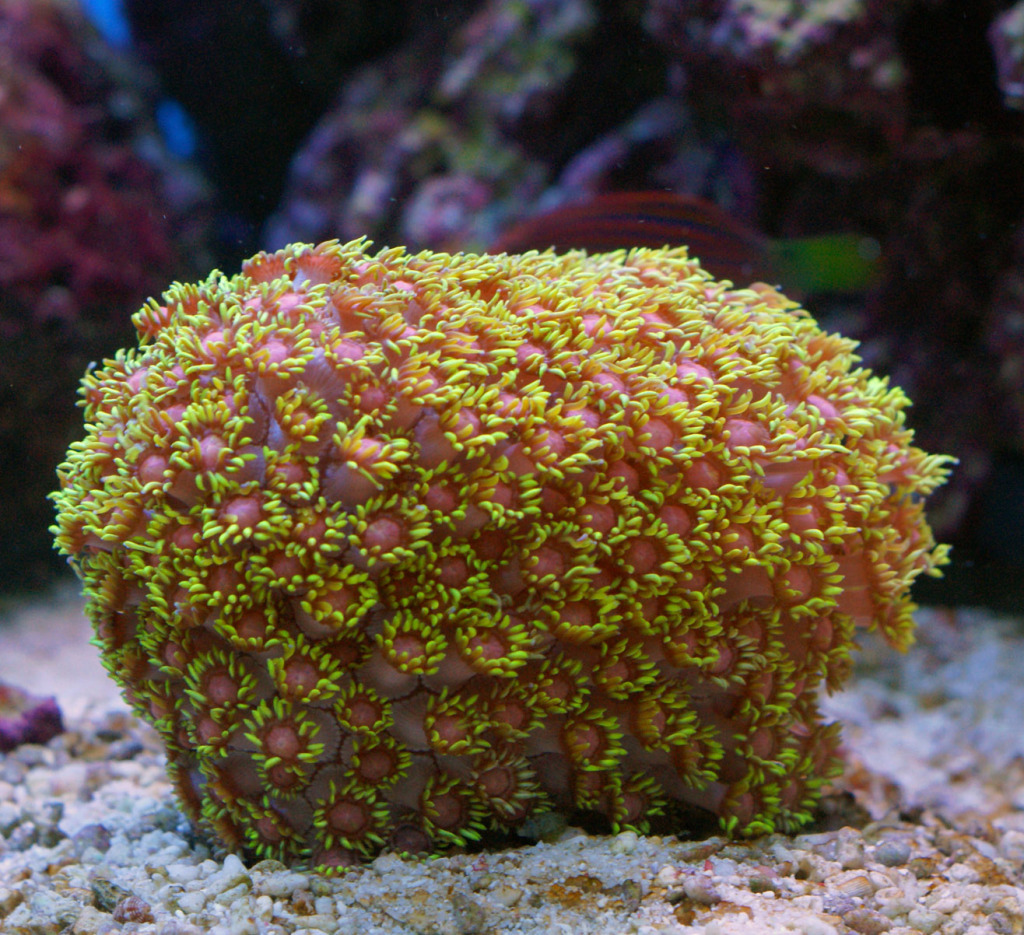
A variety of Goniopora sp.

Goniopora, commonly referred to as flowerpot coral or daisy coral, is a genus of colonial stony coral found in lagoons and turbid water conditions. Goniopora have numerous daisy-like polyps that extend outward from the base, each tipped with 24 stinging tentacles which surrounds a mouth.

== Distribution ==
Species of Goniopora can be found in the Persian Gulf, the Indian Ocean, and various tropical and subtropical areas of the Pacific Ocean. Various species live as far north as Hong Kong (where they are the dominant colonial non-reef-building coral) and off the coast of southern Japan. Goniopora were present in the Caribbean during the Miocene Epoch, although they have since gone locally extinct there.

== Care ==
Goniopora are a very difficult coral to keep alive and are not recommended for a novice reef aquarium hobbyist. The short, greenish-colored species are more sensitive than the pink or purple species. Goniopora require moderate to high lighting, depending on species. They must also have some water movement so their polyps can move freely. However, it should not be directed at the polyps or the movement might be too vigorous. Goniopora are sensitive corals and can retract when disturbed. The water temperature must remain between 77 and 84 °F (25 and 29 °C). There must be adequate amounts of calcium and iron in the tank to help skeletal development. Placement in the tank is also crucial. They must be well positioned on a sturdy rock to avoid damaging falls. When placing Goniopora they must have enough room to grow and move their tentacles. Goniopora should be monitored for shriveling after being moved to a new tank to make sure they are getting enough sunlight.

== Feeding ==
Goniopora are avid feeders and are susceptible to death from nutritional deficiencies. There are many different ways to feed Goniopora. They can be gently fed with a syringe, or broadcast-fed. However, direct feeding seems to work best. Alternately, plankton can be placed in the tank with all filtration systems off so the food does not get swept away. The filters should be turned back on after one to two hours to keep the tank clean and livable for all of the creatures. Goniopora need foods high in manganese and iron.

== Fragging ==
Goniopora grow daughter cells in a type of asexual reproduction called Fragmentation or fragging. The mother corals have wounds from the daughter corals that usually heal up in about two weeks. The daughter corals grow about 1 millimeter a month. Some scientists suggest that the daughter Goniopora live inside cells of the mother coral before breaking out and growing on their own.

== Issues ==
There are many issues that go along with keeping Goniopora. The first one is that it is very hard to locate and buy, especially the red species. Goniopora may grow in murky or clear water depending on the species. Because different species have such different requirements, it adds to the challenge of keeping them alive.

== Species ==
This genus contains the following species:

- Goniopora albiconus Veron, 2002
- Goniopora burgosi Nemenzo, 1955
- Goniopora calicularis (Lamarck, 1816)
- Goniopora cellulosa Veron, 1990
- Goniopora ciliatus Veron, 2002
- Goniopora columna Dana, 1846
- Goniopora diminuta (Veron, 2000)
- Goniopora djiboutiensis Vaughan, 1907
- Goniopora eclipsensis Veron & Pichon, 1982
- Goniopora fruticosa Saville-Kent, 1891
- Goniopora granulosa Pillai & Scheer, 1976
- Goniopora lobata Milne Edwards & Haime
- Goniopora norfolkensis Veron & Pichon, 1982
- Goniopora paliformis (Veron, 2000)
- Goniopora palmensis Veron & Pichon, 1982
- Goniopora pandoraensis Veron & Pichon, 1982
- Goniopora pearsoni Veron, 2002
- Goniopora pedunculata Quoy & Gaimard, 1833
- Goniopora pendulus Veron, 1985
- Goniopora petiolata Nemenzo, 1955
- Goniopora planulata (Ehrenberg)
- Goniopora polyformis Zou, 1980
- Goniopora savignyi (Dana)
- Goniopora somaliensis Vaughan, 1907
- Goniopora stokesi Milne Edwards & Haime, 1851
- Goniopora sultani Veron, DeVantier & Turak, 2002
- Goniopora tantillus (Claereboudt & Al Amri, 2004)
- Goniopora tenella (Quelch)
- Goniopora tenuidens Quelch
