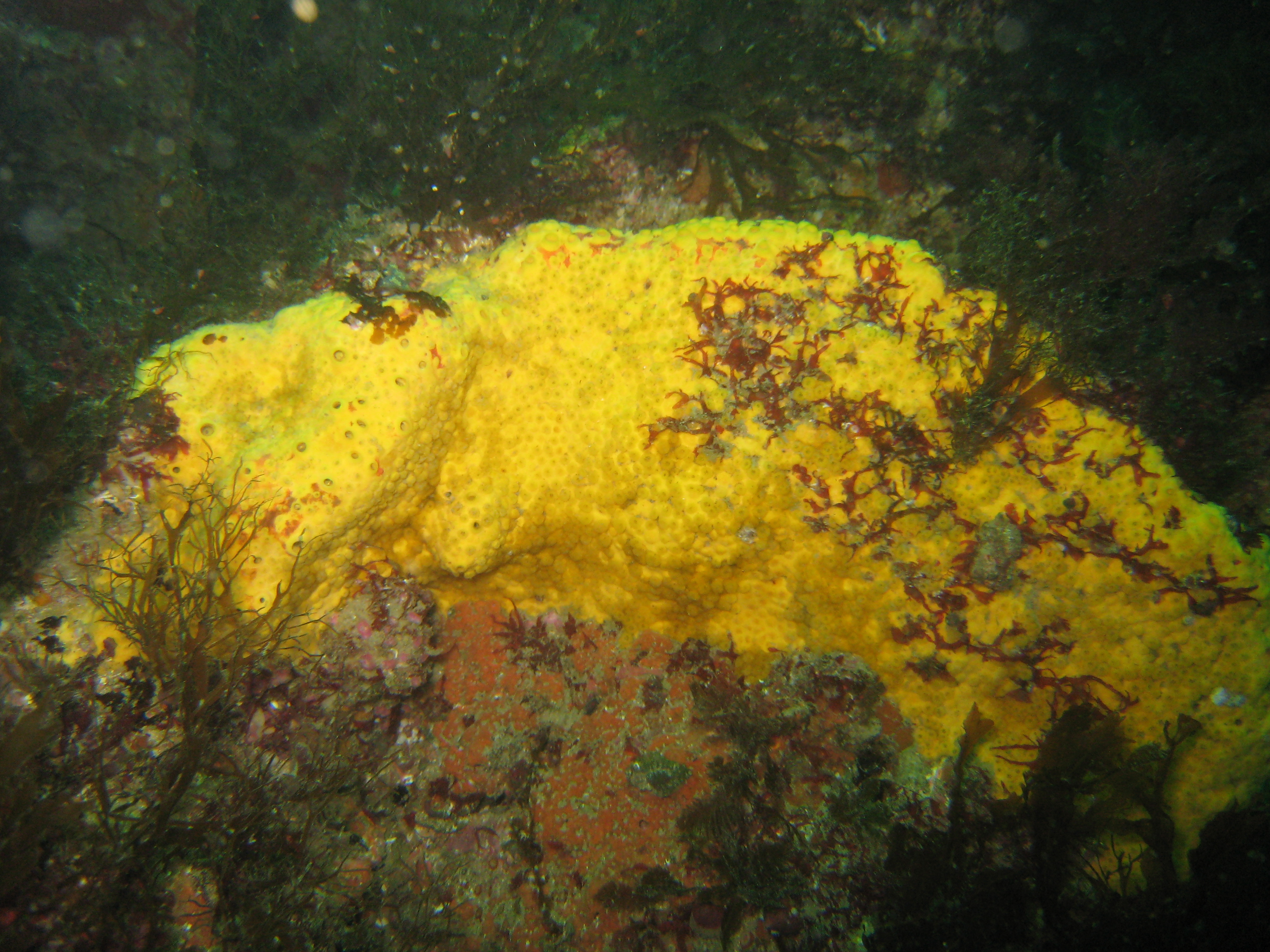

Conservation status
- Secure (NatureServe)

Scientific classification
- Kingdom: Animalia
- Phylum: Porifera
- Class: Demospongiae
- Order: Clionaida
- Family: Clionaidae
- Genus: Cliona
- Species: C. celata

Binomial name
- Cliona celata Grant, 1826

Synonyms
- List: Cliona alderi Hancock, 1849; Cliona angulata Hancock, 1849; Cliona clio (Nardo, 1839); Cliona coccinea (Nardo, 1839); Cliona globulifera Hancock, 1867; Cliona gorgonioides Hancock, 1849; Cliona griffithsii (Bowerbank, 1866); Cliona hystrix (Johnston, 1842); Cliona pasithea (Nardo, 1839); Cliona sulphurea (Desor, 1851); Cliona tenebrosus (Bowerbank, 1882); Cliona terebrans (Duvernoy, 1840); Cliona typica (Nardo, 1833); Halichondria celata (Grant, 1826); Halichondria hystrix Johnston, 1842; Hymeniacidon celata (Grant, 1826); Hymeniacidon celatus (Grant, 1826); Hymeniacidon tenebrosus Bowerbank, 1882; Pione typica (Nardo, 1833); Raphyrus griffithsii Bowerbank, 1866; Rhaphyrus griffithsii Bowerbank, 1866; Spongia peziza Bosc, 1802; Spongia sulphurea Desor, 1851; Spongia terebrans Duvernoy, 1840; Suberites griffithsii (Bowerbank, 1866); Vioa celata (Grant, 1826); Vioa clio Nardo, 1839; Vioa coccinea Nardo, 1839; Vioa dujardini Nardo, 1844; Vioa pasithea Nardo, 1839; Vioa typica Nardo, 1833

= Cliona celata =

Boring sponge

Species of sponge

Cliona celata, occasionally called the boring sponge, is a species of demosponge belonging the family Clionaidae. It is found worldwide. This sponge bores round holes up to 5 millimetres (0.20 in) in diameter in limestone or the shells of molluscs, especially oysters. The sponge itself is often visible as a rather featureless yellow or orange lump at the bottom of the hole.

== Habitat and geographic range ==
Cliona celata inhabits coastal waters and is known to bore into calcium-rich substrates. They are known to make their home on both living and dead mollusks or other shelled creatures. The also can bore into limestone rocks and various types of corals. They are typically found in waters up to 200 m deep.

This sponge is distributed worldwide in the coastal waters of every continent except for Antarctica. They are highly concentrated in the English channel, the North Sea, and the Mediterranean Sea.

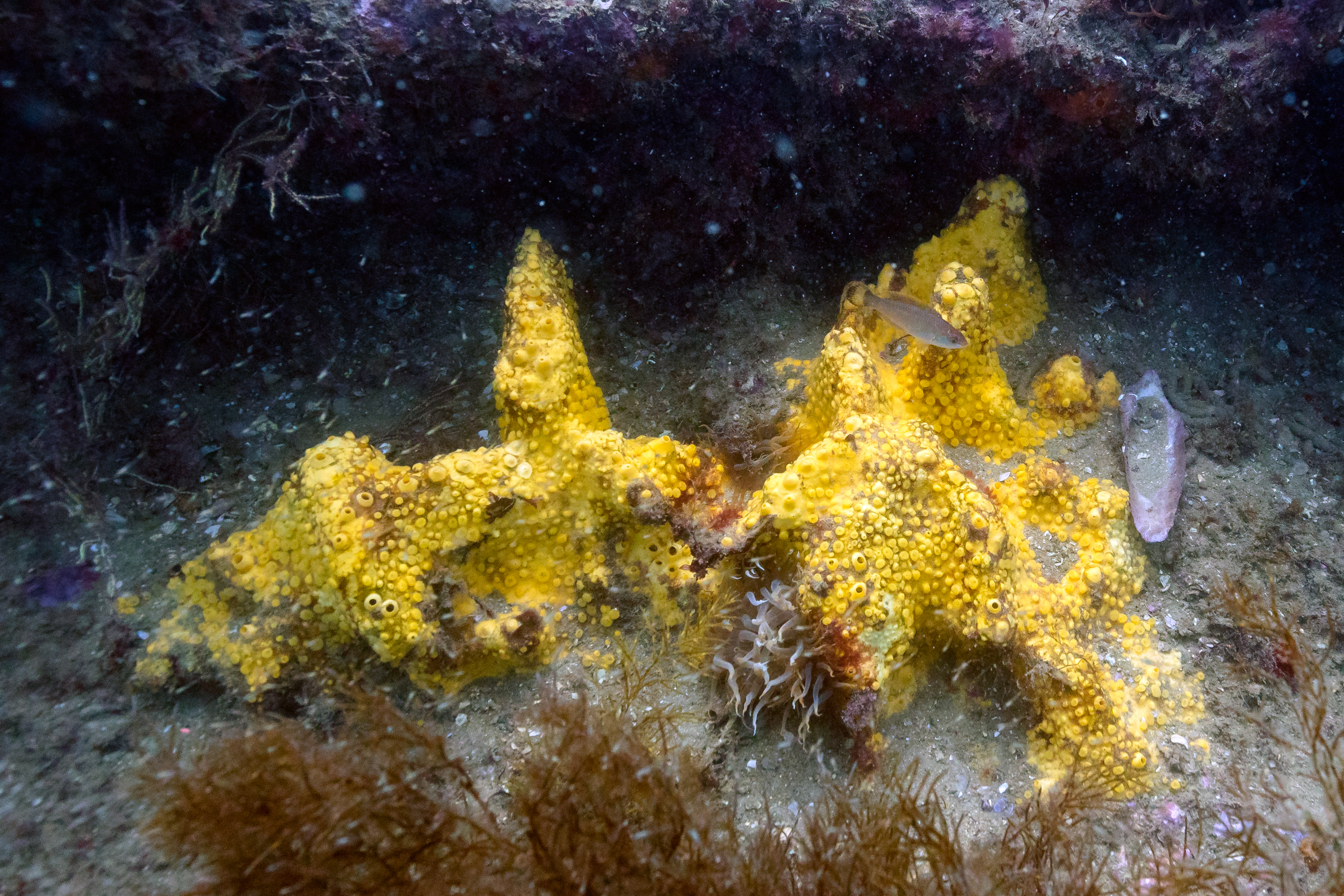
Cliona celata

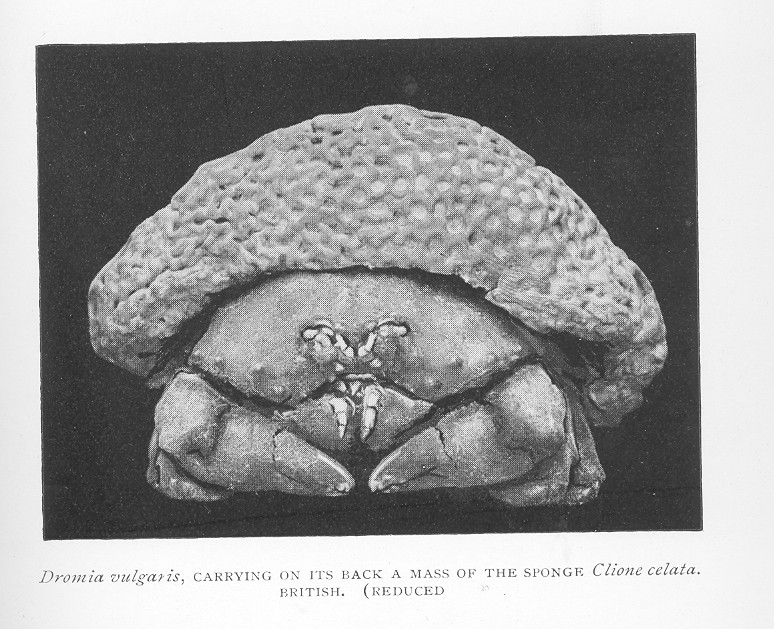
Cliona celata inhabiting the shell of a crab

== Morphology ==
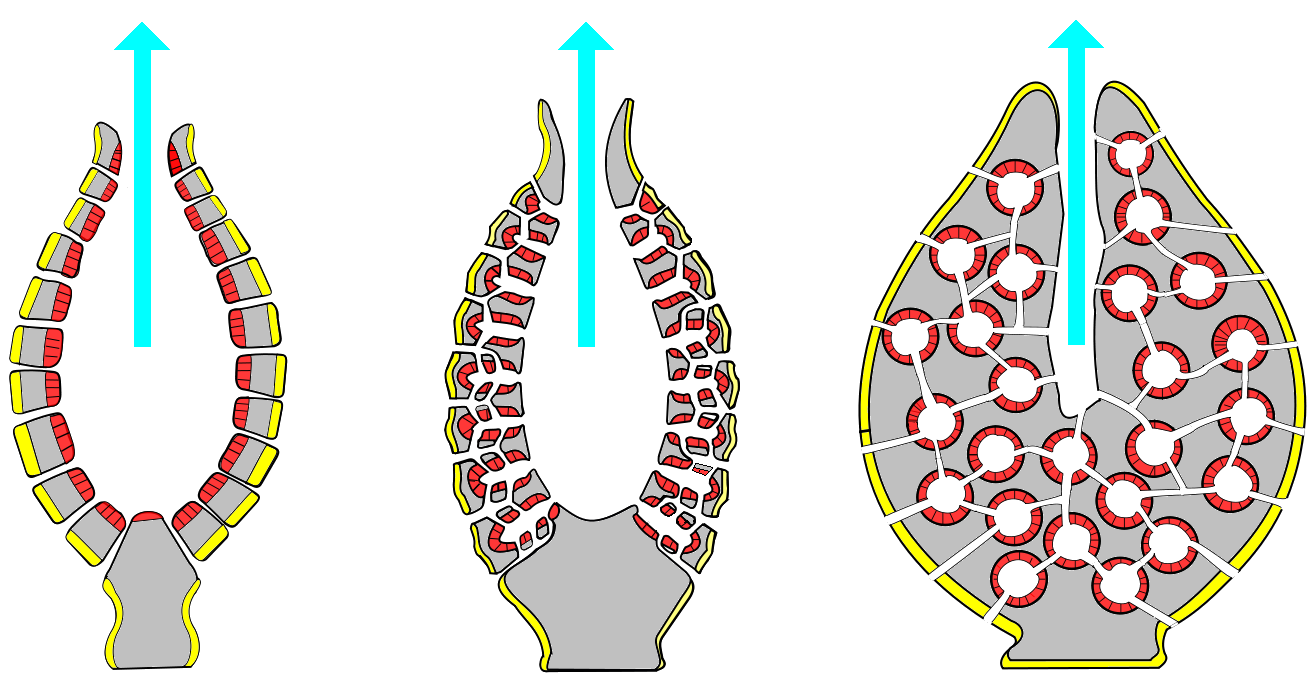
Sponge Body Plans: asconoid (left), syconoid (middle), and leuconoid (right)

Sponges are asymmetrical, multicellular, diploblastic organisms that lack true tissues. They have two cell layers: the pinacoderm and the choanocyte layer. The pinacoderm layer is the epidermal layer that consists of pinacocyte cells that have the ability to contract. The contraction of these cells allows for the sponge to change its shape. The choanocyte layer is made up of choanocyte cells that line the inner space of the sponge. The choanocyte cells utilize their flagella to create a water current that circulates water throughout the sponge. The circulation of water brings in food particles and sperm, both of which are collected by choanocytes. In addition to the pinacocyte and choanocyte layers, sponges also have a non-living mesohyl layer that is located between the two living layers. Despite being made up of non-living material, the mesohyl contains living cells called archaeocytes. Archaeocytes are specialized cells that can modify themselves according to what a sponge needs. These cells aid in digestion, reproduction, waste elimination, and support element production. Such support elements (e.g., spongin and spicules) are also found in the mesohyl layer. This species has a leuconoid body plan, which is the most complex construction a sponge can have. This layout is made up of numerous complex choanocyte chambers and highly complex canal systems.

The path water takes through Cliona celata is directly related to its leuconoid body plan. First, water enters the sponge though small pores called ostia. The water then runs through incurrent channels and through openings (prosopyles) to reach the flagellated canals. From there, the water passes through more openings (apopyles) to reach excurrent channels. Water is then channeled into a larger channel that eventually leads to the osculum, where water exits the sponge. The leuconoid body plan doesn't feature a spongocoel.

== Etching (boring) mechanism ==
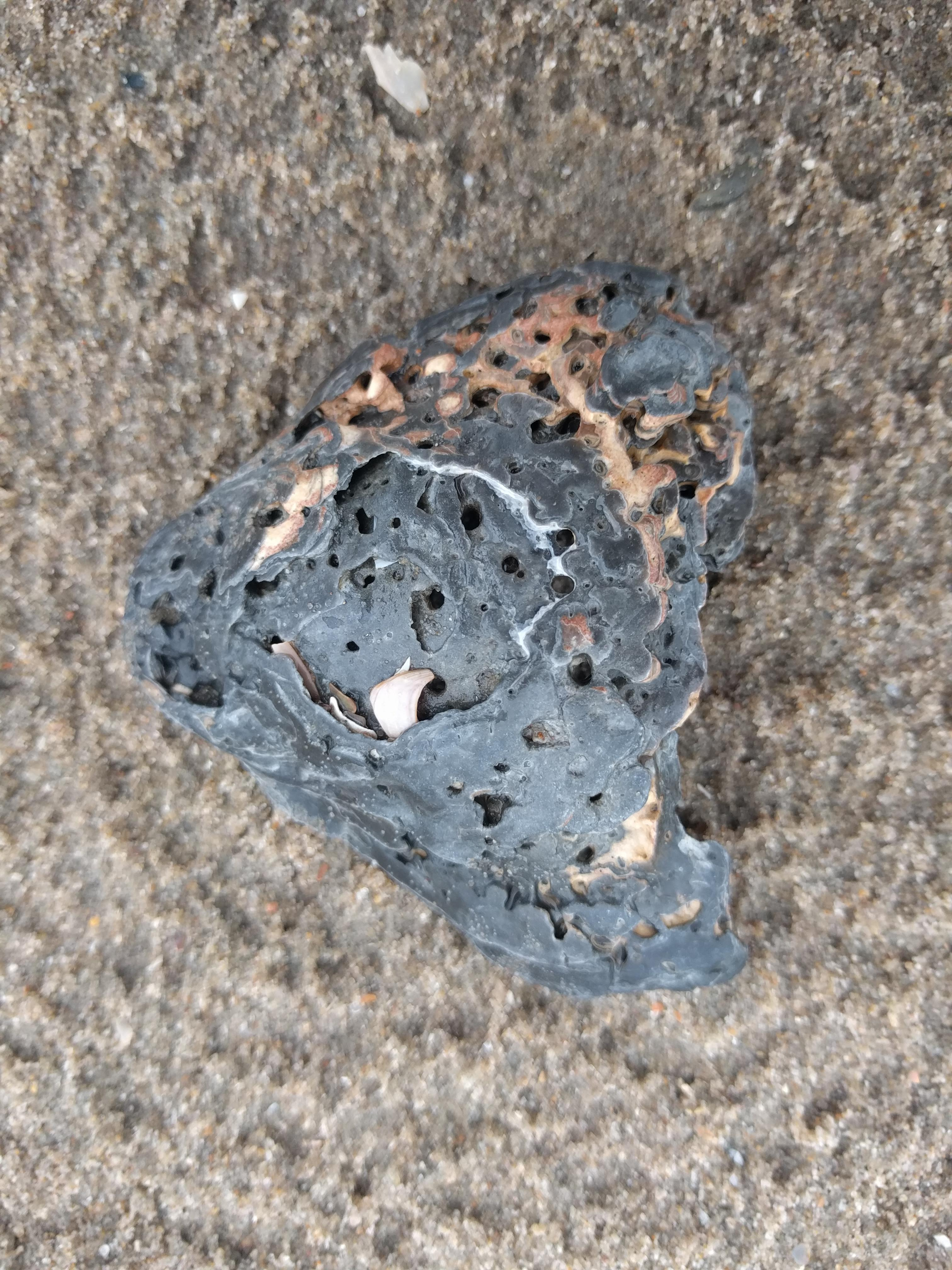
Shell with holes caused by Cliona celata

This sponge is known for boring holes into calcium-rich substrates, hence the "boring sponge" nickname. The exact process is still being investigated, but it is known that the boring is accomplished by the utilization of specialized cells called etching cells. These cells are differentiated archaeocyte cells that form cytoplasmic finger-like protrusions. These protrusions are thought to secrete an acid that dissolves calcium-containing substances. The calcium chips they etch out are swept away through the sponge's water channels and end up as products of bioerosion. The chips are also recognizable due to being uniform in size and shape.

== Ecology ==
In a marine ecosystem, Cliona celata is an indicator species of pollution zones. Their main role is breaking down and dissolving calcium carbonate. They bore into calcium carbonate substrates such as oyster reefs and coral reefs which weakens them and makes them more likely to be harmed. They often completely take over reefs which lessens competition for other reef dwellers. C. celata has been recorded to withstand higher-than-normal water temperatures and salinity levels. Due to their high tolerance for environmental stress, reefs that have been harmed or destroyed by coral bleaching are especially vulnerable to these sponges taking over. Despite this, the calcareous material they etch away positively contributes to the sediment composition surrounding the reefs. C. celata has the ability to regenerate papillae when it is eaten by predators and this process takes almost 2 weeks. Their predators include other benthic organisms such as echinoderms, molluscs, polychaetes and crustaceans. Arbacia, a genus of sea urchins, is a predator that can consume the sponge before it has time to regenerate. This sponge is a filter feeder that draws in water through its ostia. They typically feed on plankton and other organic matter that is suspended in the water column.

== Distinguishing features ==
There are many features of Cliona celata that set them apart from other sponges in the phylum. While also known as the "boring sponge", Cliona celata is the only species of sponge without microscleres this called symbiotic sponge. Cliona celata is a distinctive sponge known for its unique morphology and characteristics. In its 'raphyrus' or massive stage, it forms large lobose structures with rounded ridges, reaching sizes of up to 40 cm across and 100 cm in length. These sponges can be found boring into substrates like limestone, shells, or calcareous red algae, appearing as clear sulphur-lemon lobes or rounded papillae tips.

The coloration of C. celata varies from yellow in its natural state to darker shades when exposed to air and brown when preserved in alcohol. Red discoloration around oscular openings is occasionally observed, possibly due to symbiotic algae. The sponge has a firm, compact consistency with a tough outer layer. Its surface in the massive form is characterized by tuberculate inhalant papillae, large oscules with raised rims along the ridges, and delicate inhalant papillae that can extend up to 1 cm when active. These features contract significantly when out of water.

Internally, C. celata exhibits a confused skeletal structure without clear differentiation into ectosomal and internal skeletons. Its spicules consist of tylostyles ranging from 280 to 430 μm, densely and irregularly arranged, often with swellings near their tips. While microscleres are typically absent, their presence, if any, might indicate a related species. Habitat-wise, C. celata is resilient to sediment and can be found on rocks across a wide distribution from Sweden to Gibraltar in the Eastern Atlantic and the Mediterranean.

== Economic impact and ecological role ==
C. celata has various relationships with a plethora of creatures living within marine environments. Some of these relationships can be quite beneficial to various organisms, but can be seen as invasive to others. There has been a study showing that C. celata can potentially impact the rate at which another marine species can reproduce or potentially grow. One example of this is how boring sponges (Cilona celata) have been seen as an issue for the restoration of oysters. elata has not been indicated as a serious threat to other marine life and therefore should not be considered as a dangerous sponge.

In fact, this boring sponge seems to have a potentially bright future in the medical field for some individuals. Extensive research has been done on C. celata, and it has shown that this boring sponge may potentially have certain compounds present in it that are great for anti-inflammatory purposes. This research could potentially lead to new medications that could help maintain/control inflammation in numerous patients who buy everyday anti-inflammatory pills and much more. This seems to be beneficial due to the fact that Cilona celata has shown adaptability various abiotic factors found in a typical day-to-day marine life. The Cilona celata population is still versatile to many things including many bioeroders that try to target them quite frequently.

== Reproduction ==
Cliona celata is capable of both asexual and sexual reproduction. Asexual reproduction is achieved through either the process of fragmentation or the process of budding. Fragmentation occurs when one or more segments of a sponge break off and form a new individual. Budding is the formation of a bud that eventually matures into a new individual and breaks off of the parent sponge.

Sexual reproduction is made possible through the production of gametes. This sponge is hermaphroditic, so it produces both male and female gametes. Sponges lack tissues which means they don't have a reproductive system to produce gametes. Gametes are instead produced by specialized cells called archaeocytes that can differentiate into sperm and egg cells. Egg production typically peaks in the months April and May. This sponge usually reproduces via the process of broadcast spawning. Sperm is released from a sponge's oscula, into the water column, and into another sponge through its ostia. The sperm is captured by choanocytes, taken into the mesohyl by archaeocytes, and eventually transported to the eggs where fertilization will take place.

Once fertilization occurs, Cliona celata's embryo develops into a multi-flagellated parenchymula larva. This larva has a short-lived swimming stage before it attaches to a substrate where further development will take place.
