= Umimayanthus =

Scientific classification
- Kingdom: Animalia
- Phylum: Cnidaria
- Subphylum: Anthozoa
- Class: Hexacorallia
- Order: Zoantharia
- Family: Parazoanthidae
- Genus: Umimayanthus; Montenegro, Sinniger & Reimer, 2015

Species
- Umimayanthus chanpuru Montenegro, Sinniger & Reimer, 2015; Umimayanthus kanabou Fujii, dos Santos & Reimer, 2021; Umimayanthus miyabi Montenegro, Sinniger & Reimer, 2015; Umimayanthus nakama Montenegro, Sinniger & Reimer, 2015; Umimayanthus parasiticus (Duchassaing de Fonbressin & Michelotti, 1860); Umimayanthus mirnangga Montenegro, Kise & Reimer 2024; Umimayanthus jebarra Montenegro, Kise & Reimer 2024; Umimayanthus wunanggu Montenegro, Kise & Reimer 2024; Umimayanthus discolor Montenegro, Kise & Reimer 2024; Umimayanthus lynherensis Montenegro, Kise & Reimer 2024; Umimayanthus raksasa Montenegro, Kise & Reimer 2024

Genus of corals

Umimayanthus is a genus of anthozoans in the order Zoantharia.
