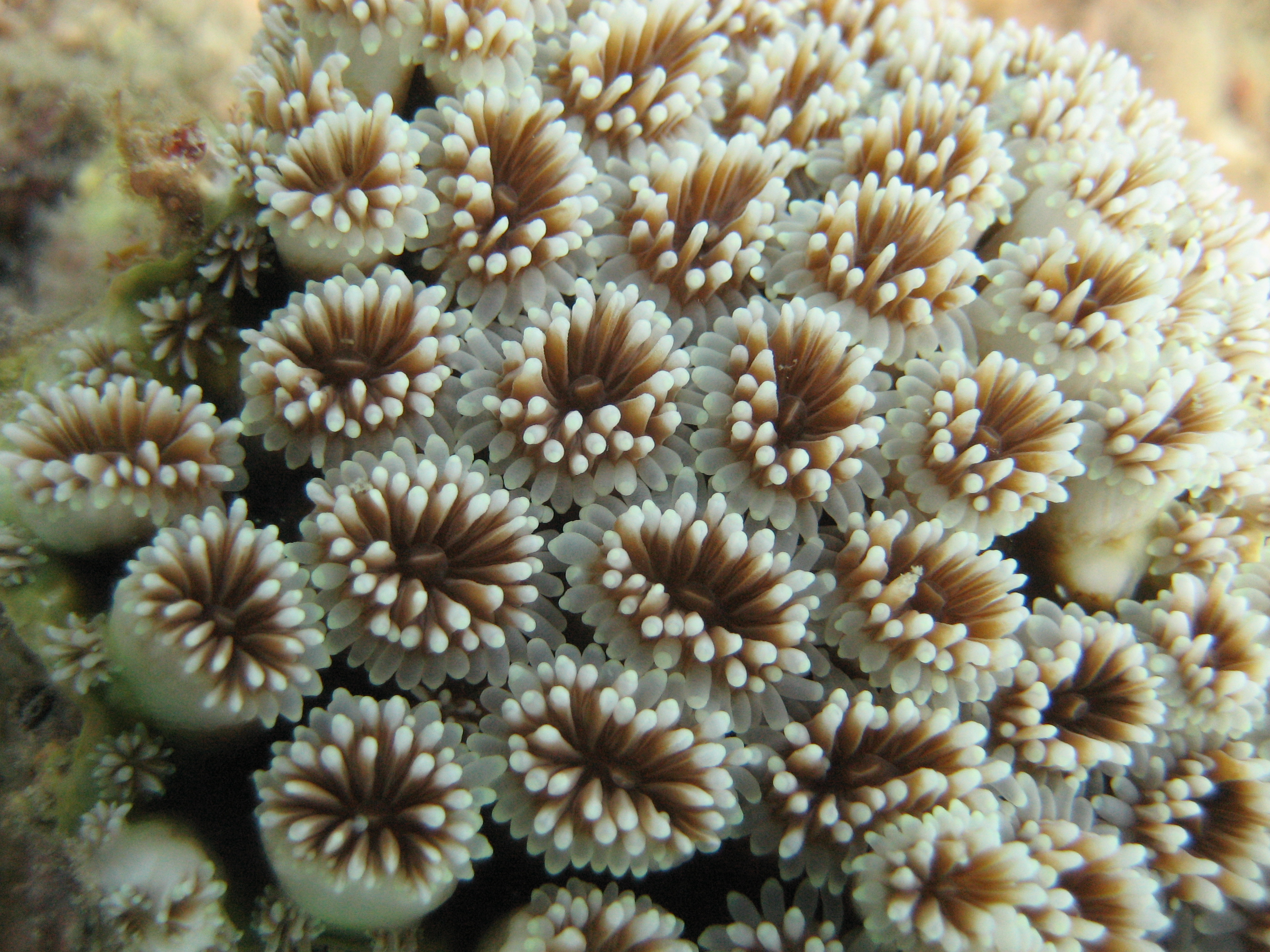

Conservation status
- Least Concern (IUCN 3.1)

Scientific classification
- Kingdom: Animalia
- Phylum: Cnidaria
- Subphylum: Anthozoa
- Class: Hexacorallia
- Order: Scleractinia
- Family: Poritidae
- Genus: Goniopora
- Species: G. stokesi

Binomial name
- Goniopora stokesi Milne-Edwards & Haime, 1851

Synonyms
- Alveopora irregularis Crossland, 1952

= Goniopora stokesi =

Species of coral

Goniopora stokesi is a species of colonial stony coral. As with other species in genus Goniopora, it has the common names 'flowerpot coral' and 'daisy coral'. The International Union for Conservation of Nature (IUCN) categorises its status as near threatened.

== Description ==
Goniopora stokesi is found widely across the northern Indian Ocean and the western Pacific Ocean. In roughly clockwise order: from Madagascar and the Gulf of Aden in the west, through the Maldives and southern India, through the East Indies, up to Japan, and down to northern parts of Western Australia, and to the Great Barrier Reef in the east. It has been described as usually uncommon but conspicuous, but sometimes locally common. It has been reported at depths of 9–20 m (30–66 ft), less commonly at 3–30 m (10–100 ft). It is usually free-living; that is, not attached to a fixed substrate. Colonies are often found on sandy bottoms, in turbid and relatively still waters. They are usually hemispherical, and often have satellite (daughter) colonies which have not yet budded off.

Goniopora stokesi has a reputation among aquarists both of being readily available commercially, and of being difficult to maintain in captivity. The aquarium trade may be one reason why the species is under threat.

The specific epithet stokesi may be in honour of Charles Stokes (c. 1784 - 1853), a respected English amateur malacologist. It would be necessary to consult the original paper describing the species (which as of 2018 does not seem to have been digitised) to settle the matter.
