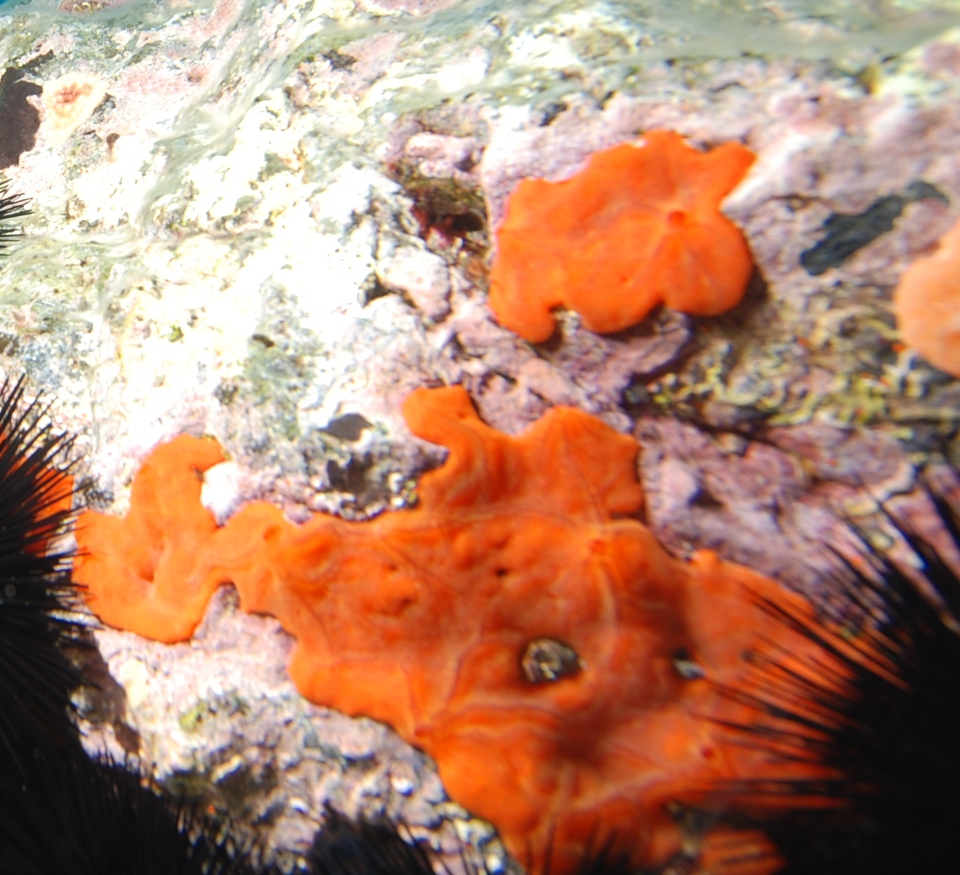

Scientific classification
- Kingdom: Animalia
- Phylum: Porifera
- Class: Demospongiae
- Order: Clionaida
- Family: Spirastrellidae

= Spirastrellidae =

Family of sponges

Spirastrellidae is a family of sponges belonging to the order Clionaida.

== Distribution ==
Spirastrellidae are found in reef environments. The highest concentration of the population is found off of the coasts of the Florida Keys and Havana, Cuba, as well as circling the perimeter of Australia. Sparser populations are located between the coasts of Southwestern Europe and Northern Africa, as well as scattered around several east Asian countries.

== Appearance ==
The color of Spirastrellidae varies, but they are most often a shade of orange. In warm, shallow waters, they are a bright, neon orange hue. In deeper, cooler waters, they tend to be a fainter pink, even being seen as white with red spots in more extreme reef conditions. They are encrusting sponges, with hard exteriors. These tough exteriors, and other components of the sponge, are composed of spirasters, amphiaster, or diplasters. These are all essentially different types of microscleres (very tiny skeletal components).

== Life span and behavior ==
Assisted by a slow metabolism and an ability to regenerate, many members of the Spirastrellidae family live for hundreds, if not thousands of years. However, their lifespan is directly correlated to the depth of the water they live in, with deep sea specimens living significantly longer. As a young sponge, they burrow into limestone, but do not carry this endolithic behavior into adulthood.

- Diplastrella Topsent, 1918
- Spirastrella Schmidt, 1868
