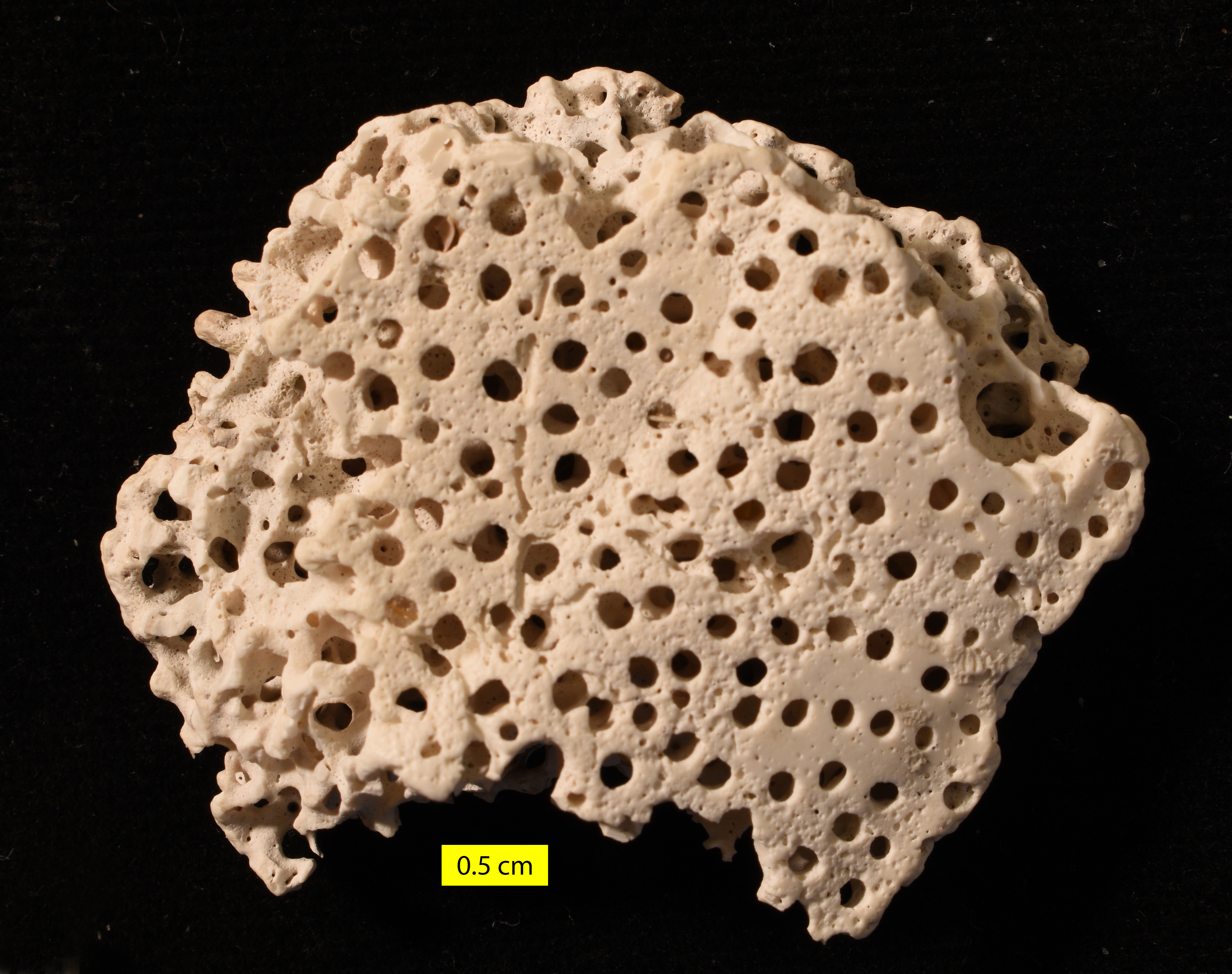
- Modern clionaid borings in an oyster shell

Scientific classification
- Kingdom: Animalia
- Phylum: Porifera
- Class: Demospongiae
- Order: Clionaida
- Family: Clionaidae d'Orbigny, 1851

Genera
- See text

Synonyms
- Clionidae d'Orbigny, 1851

= Clionaidae =

Family of sponges

Clionaidae is a family of ectoparasitic demosponges which are found worldwide. This group of sponges are well known for boring holes in calcareous material such as mollusc shells and coral skeletons, using both chemical and mechanical processes.

== Genera ==
Genera within this family include:

- Cervicornia Rützler & Hooper, 2000
- Cliona Grant, 1826
- Clionaopsis Rützler, 2002
- Cliothosa Topsent, 1905
- Dotona Carter, 1880
- Pione Gray, 1867
- Scolopes Sollas, 1888
- Spheciospongia Marshall, 1892
- Spiroxya Topsent, 1896
- Volzia Rosell & Uriz, 1997
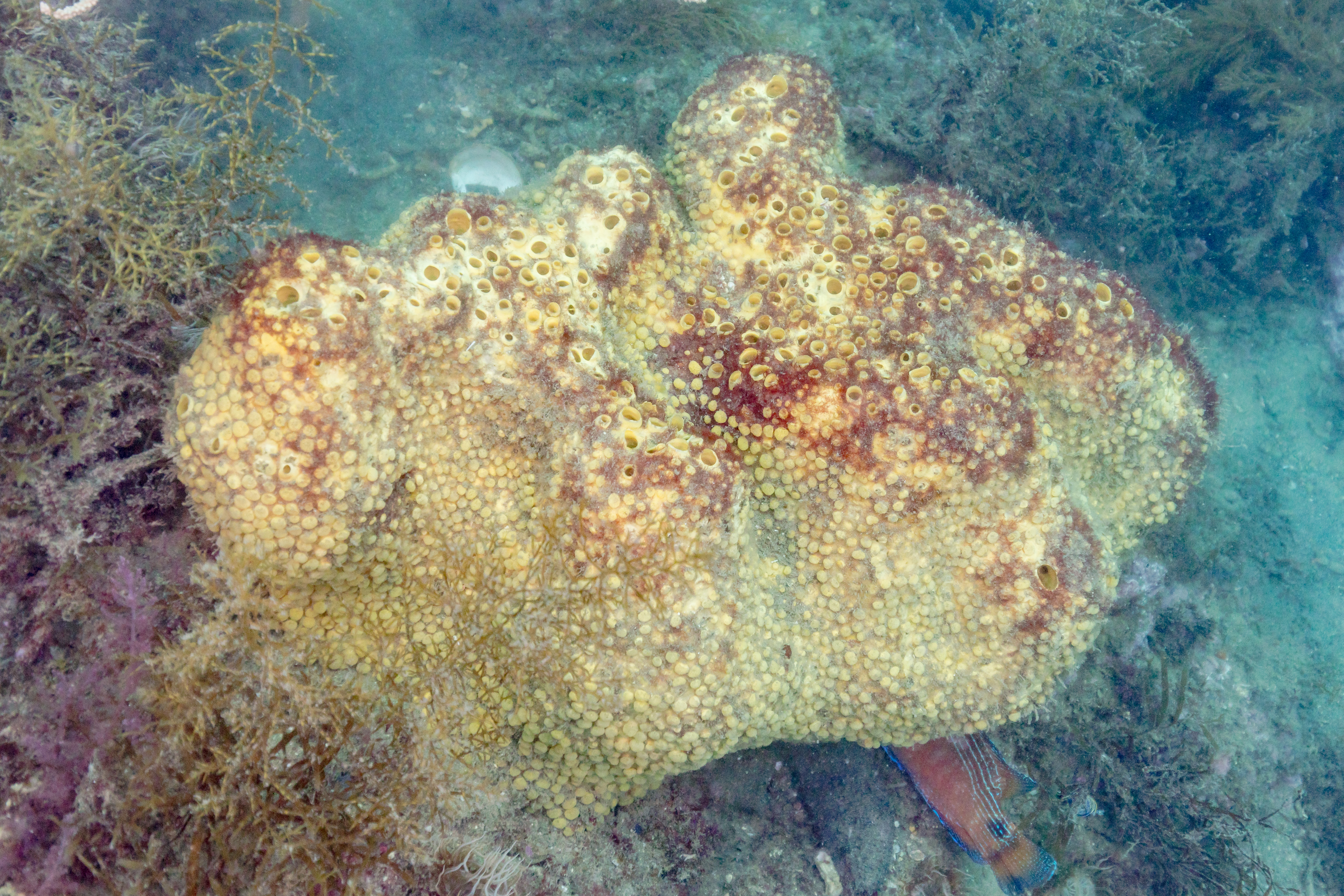
Cliona celata

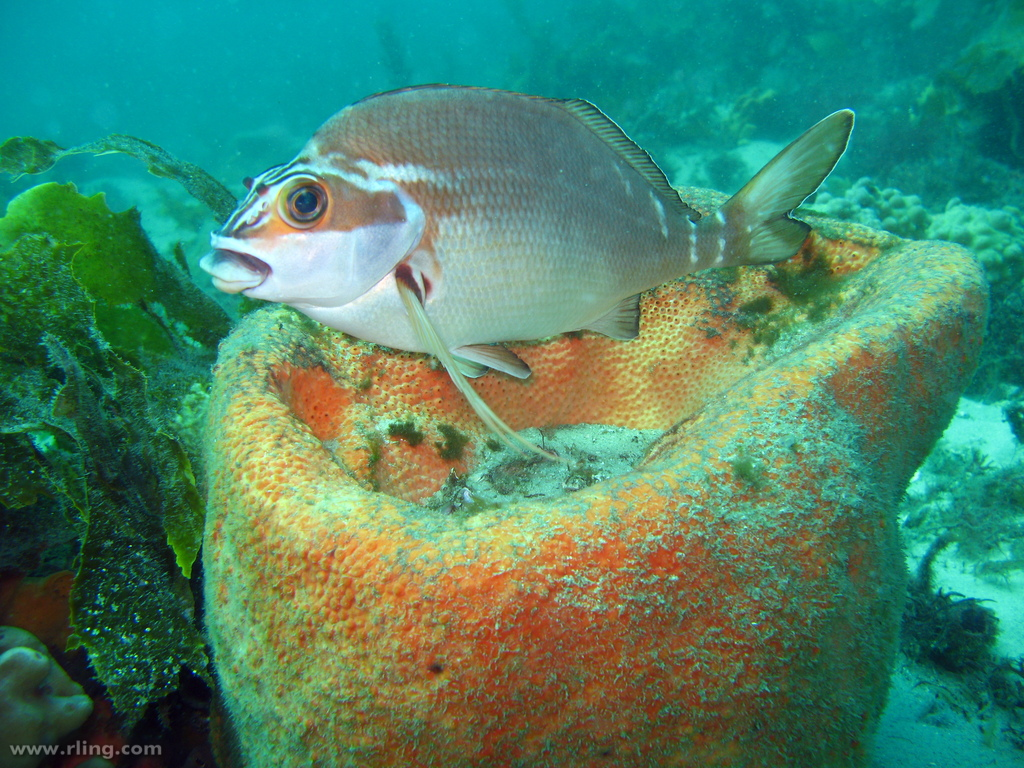
Cheilodactylus fuscus resting in Pione hixoni

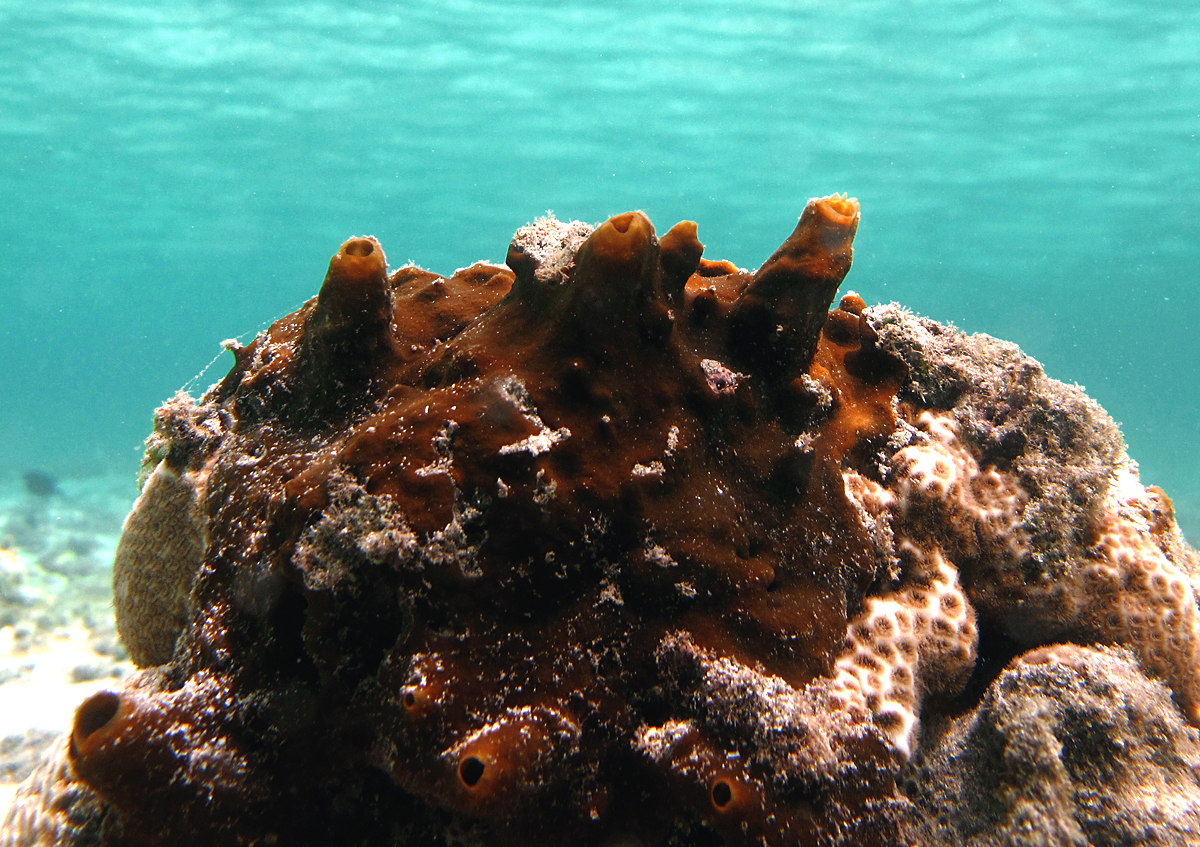
Spheciospongia vagabunda
