= Osculum =

Excretory structure in the living sponge

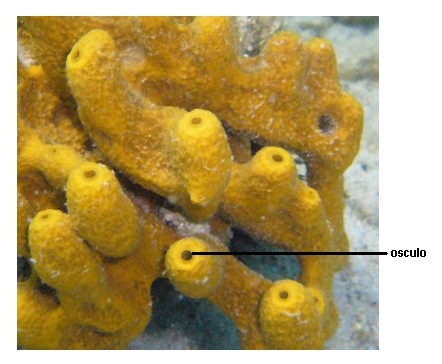
Osculum

The osculum (pl.: oscula) is an excretory structure in the living sponge, a large opening to the outside through which the current of water exits after passing through the spongocoel. Wastes diffuse into the water and the water is pumped through the osculum carrying away with it the sponge's wastes. Sponges pump large volumes of water: typically a volume of water equal to the sponge's body size is pumped every five seconds. The size of the osculum is regulated by contractile myocytes. Its size, in turn, is one of the factors which determines the amount of water flowing through the sponge. It can be closed completely in response to excess silt in the water.
