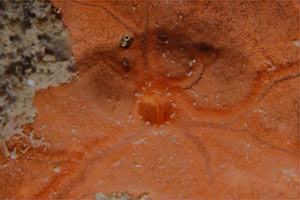
- Spirastrella cunctatrix

Scientific classification
- Kingdom: Animalia
- Phylum: Porifera
- Class: Demospongiae
- Subclass: Heteroscleromorpha
- Order: Clionaida; Morrow & Cárdenas, 2015

Families
- Acanthochaetetidae Fischer, 1970; Clionaidae d'Orbigny, 1851; Placospongiidae Gray, 1867; Spirastrellidae Ridley & Dendy, 1886

= Clionaida =

Order of sponges

Clionaida is an order of demosponges in the subclass Heteroscleromorpha.

== Familiae ==
Familiae within this order include:

- Acanthochaetetidae Fischer, 1970
- Clionaidae d'Orbigny, 1851
- Placospongiidae Gray, 1867
- Spirastrellidae Ridley & Dendy, 1886
