= Codonosiga elegans =

Scientific classification
- Domain: Eukaryota
- Clade: Obazoa
- Clade: Opisthokonta
- Class: Choanoflagellata
- Order: Craspedida
- Family: Codonosigidae
- Genus: Codonosiga
- Species: C. elegans

Binomial name
- Codonosiga elegans De Saedeleer, 1927

Species of choanoflagellate

Codonosiga elegans is a species of choanoflagellate in the family Codonosigidae. It may be a species complex containing multiple cryptic species – four distinct genotypes are known.
