= Crinolina isefiordensis =

Scientific classification
- Domain: Eukaryota
- Clade: Amorphea
- Class: Choanoflagellata
- Order: Acanthoecida
- Family: Acanthoecidae
- Genus: Crinolina
- Species: C. isefiordensis

Binomial name
- Crinolina isefiordensis Thomsen, 1976

Species of choanoflagellate

Crinolina isefiordensis is a species of choanoflagellate in the family Acanthoecidae. It is the type species of the genus Crinolina and is named for the first location of its collection, the Ise Fjord in Denmark.

== Description ==
Crinolina isefiordensis is a single-celled organism that lives in a skirt-shaped lorica (net-like structure) which is open on both ends. The protoplast of the type specimen measured 8 microns by 5 microns and it does not have a chloroplast. It has a flagellum between 2-3 times as long as the protoplasts which is ringed by a collar of tentacles inside the lorica. The lorica is even longer, up to 30 microns, and is twice as wide at the base as the neck. The lorica consists of around a dozen costae (filaments that create the exoskeleton) which are roughly straight and connect the costal rings at the base and neck. Each costa is made up of six or seven small strips that are joined. At the neck of the lorica, these costae end in spines that project outwards.

The lorica of C. isefiordensis is highly similar in appearance to that of Diaphanoeca grandis in its structure. However, the main difference is that C. isefiordensis entirely lacks a membrane to connect the costae of the lorica, unlike D. grandis. Additionally, the flagellum of C. isefiordensis is usually seen curled up in a pig-tail shape, a characteristic unique to the species.

There is some minor morphological variance across populations of C. isefiordensis. Most notably, warmer water populations tend to have fewer costae and less apparent spines.

== Taxonomy ==
Crinolina isefiordensis is extremely similar to a Canadian arctic species of choanoflagellate, Diaphanoeca aperta. Because of their similarities, specifically the open rear end of their lorica, the latter species was moved into Crinolina creating the new combination Crinolina aperta. Later phylogenetic analysis confirmed the close relationship of Crinolina and Diaphanoeca, but did not merge the genera and suggested that they may be sister to one another.

== Distribution and habitat ==
The holotype of the species was collected in the winter in the cold waters of Ise Fjord in Denmark. The species has also been collected during the summer at Limfjord. In 2007, C. isefiordensis was one of the first marine choanoflagellates to be identified off the coast of Chile, and the collected specimens were nearly identical to those from Denmark. More recent studies have proven the species to be nearly cosmopolitan; it is not found only in low salinity areas like parts of the Baltic Sea as well as at extreme latitudes.
