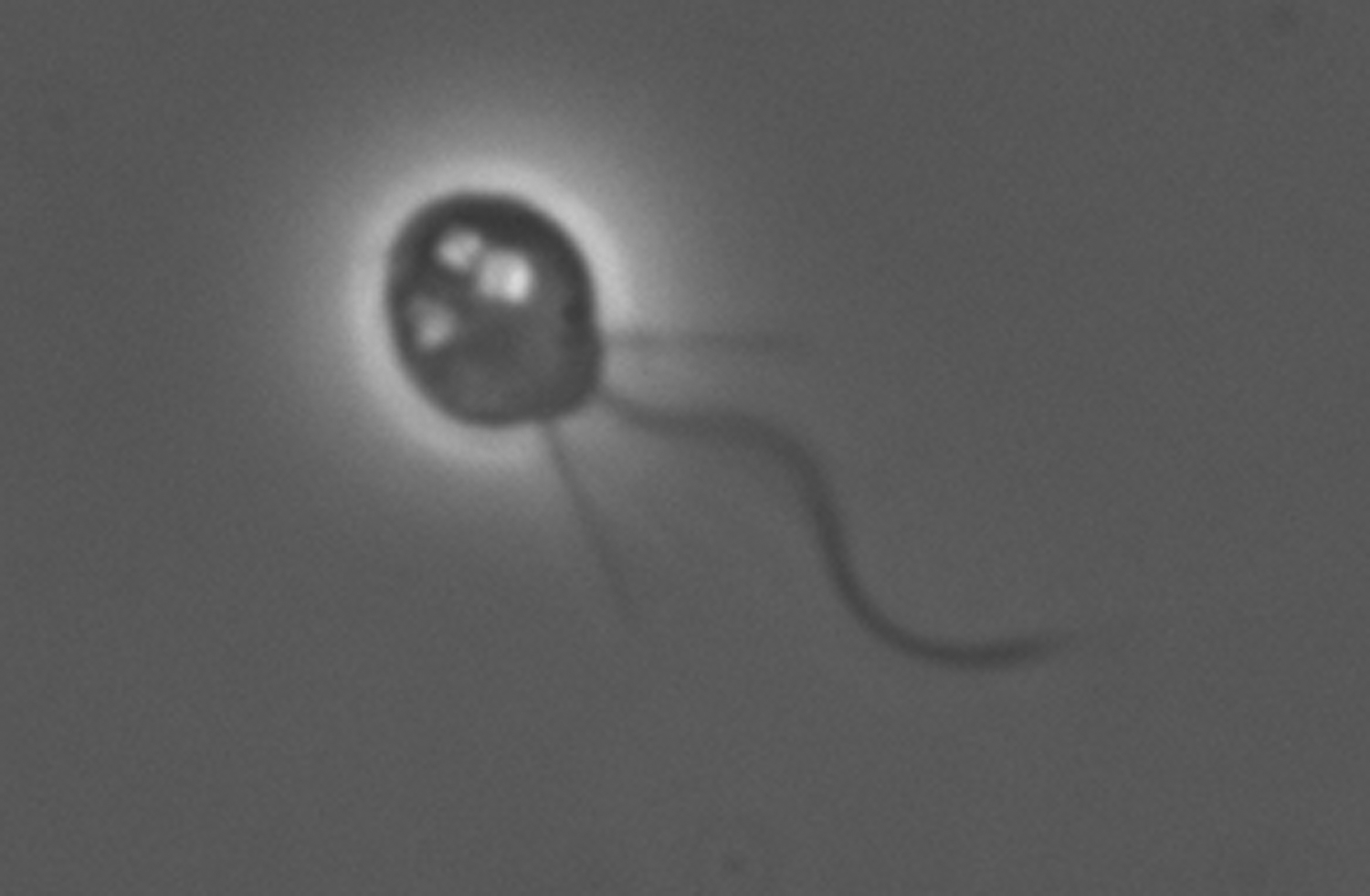
- Monosiga brevicollis

Scientific classification
- Domain: Eukaryota
- Supergroup: Amorphea
- Clade: Obazoa
- Clade: Opisthokonta
- Clade: Holozoa
- Class: Choanoflagellata
- Order: Craspedida
- Family: Codonosigaceae

= Codonosigaceae =

Family of choanoflagellates

Codonosigaceae is a family of choanoflagellates.

== Genera ==
- Codosiga James-Clark 1866
- Desmarella Kent 1880-1882
- Kentrosiga Schiller 1953
- Monosiga Kent 1880-1882
- Proterospongia Kent 1882
- Sphaeroeca Lauterborn 1894 non Meyrick 1895
- Stylochromonas Lackey 1940

Genus Diplosigopsis Francé, 1897 (uncertain > nomen dubium)
