= Diaphanoeca fiordensis =

Scientific classification
- Domain: Eukaryota
- Class: Choanoflagellata
- Order: Acanthoecida
- Family: Acanthoecidae
- Genus: Diaphanoeca
- Species: D. fiordensis

Binomial name
- Diaphanoeca fiordensis R.F.Scagel, J.R.Stein and R.E.Norris, 1930

Species of opisthokont eukaryote

Diaphanoeca fiordensis is a species of choanoflagellates belonging to the family Acanthoecidae. It is known for its silica-based lorica and filter-feeding lifestyle similar to other members of its genus.

== Habitat ==
It lives in a marine environment.
