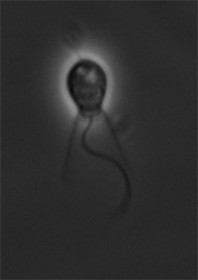

Scientific classification
- Domain: Eukaryota
- Clade: Obazoa
- Clade: Opisthokonta
- Class: Choanoflagellata
- Order: Craspedida
- Family: Salpingoecidae
- Genus: Salpingoeca
- Species: S. rosetta

Binomial name
- Salpingoeca rosetta Dayel et al., 2011

Subspecies or strains
- Salpingoeca rosetta ATCC 50818; Salpingoeca rosetta ATCC50818

Synonyms
- Proterospongia sp. ATCC 50818; Salpingoeca sp. ATCC 50818; Salpingoeca sp. ATCC50818

= Salpingoeca rosetta =

Species of opisthokont eukaryote

Salpingoeca rosetta is a species of choanoflagellate in the family Salpingoecidae. It is a rare marine eukaryote consisting of a number of cells embedded in a jelly-like matrix. This organism demonstrates a very primitive level of cell differentiation and specialization. This is seen with flagellated cells and their collar structures that move the cell colony through the water.

Similar low level cellular differentiation and specification can also be seen in sponges. They also have collar cells (also called choanocytes due to their similarities to choanoflagellates) and amoeboid cells arranged in a gelatinous matrix.
Unlike S. rosetta, sponges also have other cell-types that can perform different functions. Also, the collar cells of sponges beat within canals in the sponge body, whereas Salpingoeca rosetta's collar cells reside on the inside and it lacks internal canals. Despite these minor differences, there is strong evidence that Proterospongia and Metazoa are highly related.

Its genome has been studied as a model for pre-metazoan evolution. The genome is 55 megabases in size. Homologs of cell adhesion, neuropeptide and glycosphingolipid metabolism genes are present in the genome.

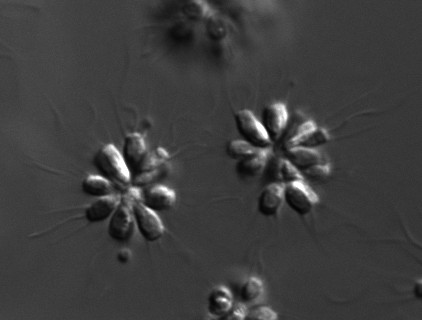
Salpingoeca rosetta colonies

== Reproduction cycle ==
Salpingoeca rosetta has a sexual cycle during which it transitions between haploid and diploid stages. When nutrients become limiting, haploid cultures of S. rosetta become diploid. This ploidy shift coincides with mating during which small, flagellated cells fuse with larger flagellated cells. Evidence has also been obtained for historical mating and recombination in S. rosetta.

Salpingoeca rosetta can be induced to undergo sexual reproduction by the marine bacterium Vibrio fischeri. A single protein of V. fischeri, EroS, fully recapitulates the aphrodesiac-like activity of living V. fischeri.

== Colonial organization ==
Salpingoeca rosetta was named for the rosette-shaped colonies formed by its cells. The colonies are held together by adhesion molecules long thought to be found only in Metazoan organisms. Additionally, recent evidence suggests that a bacterial sulfonolipid, called rosette inducing factor (RIF-1) and produced by Algoriphagus machipongonensis, triggers colony formation in S. rosetta. The effect of RIF-1 on colony formation in S. rosetta has been suggested as an example of how interactions between bacteria and eukaryotes may have led to multicellularity in the latter.
