= Protospongia =

Protospongia Temporal range: Middle Cambrian - Early Devonian

Scientific classification
- Kingdom: Animalia
- Phylum: Porifera
- Class: Hexactinellida
- Order: †Reticulosa
- Genus: †Protospongia; Salter, 1864

Species
- Protospongia fenestrata Salter, 1864 (type); Protospongia iberica Rigby et al., 1997; Protospongia columbiana Rigby et al., 1998; Protospongia conica Rigby and Harris ,1979; Protospongia gracilis Xiao et al., 2005; Protospongia hicksi Hinde, 1888; Protospongia spina Mehl et al., 1993; Protospongia tetranema Dawson, 1889

Extinct genus of sponges

Protospongia is a genus of Porifera described originally from the Middle Cambrian Menevia Formation of Porth-y-rhaw, St David’s, Pembrokeshire, SW Wales. Protospongia fenestrata Salter (1864) is the type species and, although based on only small fragments of the sponge skeleton, the arrangement of at least 3 orders of cross-shaped spicules (arranged in quadrules) is clearly evident (see Rushton & Phillips 1973, text fig. 2 for graphic). Six orders of spicule size were identified in the largest known example of Protospongia - a specimen of P. hicksi - from Clare Island, Co. Mayo, Republic of Ireland (Rushton & Phillips, op. cit.).

== Remarks ==
Protospongia hicksi is probably the only member of this genus of hexactinellid sponge to occur within the Burgess Shale and is rare in the Walcott Quarry where it represents about 0.24% of the community within the Greater Phyllopod bed (Caron and Jackson, 2008).

"Protospongia" rhenana Schlüter, 1892 from the Lower Devonian (Emsian) Hunsrück Slate of Germany, had previously been included in the genus due to the architecture of its spicules resembling that of P. hicksi. Mehl (1996), however, has since transferred Schlüter's species to the genus Cyathophycus Walcott, 1879.

Burgess Shale fossils of P. hicksi consist entirely of fragments and isolated, cruciform spicules, so the living animal's average to maximum size and growth habitus cannot be determined. If those "Protospongia" fossils outside of the Burgess Shale are of or closely related to P. hicksi, then the growth habitus of various species would have been globular, such as P. tetranema, to cup-shaped, like Cyathophycus rhenana.

The generic homonym Protospongia Kent, 1880, is a nom. illeg. because taxonomically the type species, Protospongia haeckelii Kent, is now regarded as belonging to Proterospongia Kent, 1881 Proterospongia is a genus of single-celled aquatic organisms which form colonies. It belongs to the choanoflagellate class and, interestingly, Choanoflagellates are a group of free-living unicellular and colonial flagellate eukaryotes considered to be the closest living relatives of animals.
