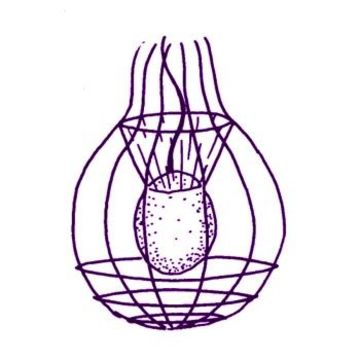
- Diagrammatic representation of Diaphanoeca grandis

Scientific classification
- Domain: Eukaryota
- Clade: Obazoa
- Clade: Opisthokonta
- Class: Choanoflagellata
- Order: Acanthoecida
- Family: Acanthoecidae
- Genus: Diaphanoeca
- Species: D. grandis

Binomial name
- Diaphanoeca grandis Ellis, 1930

= Diaphanoeca grandis =

Species of choanoflagellate

Diaphanoeca grandis is a species of choanoflagellate in the family Acanthoecidae which is the type species of the genus Diaphanoeca. It is a unicellular micro-heterotroph with a large protective lorica that is found beneath sea ice in a wide distribution. The lorica is composed of silica and possibly originates from diatoms via Horizontal gene transfer.

== Description ==
The overall size of Diaphanoeca grandis depends on its stage of growth. This variability of size is distinct to D. grandis and is not present in other related species. During the period of highest growth rate, the cell is larger, measuring on average 6 micrometers (μm) in diameter. When D. grandis is in phases of lower or stationary growth, it is one-third to half the volume of its largest size and is roughly 4 μm in diameter.

Diaphanoeca grandis has a large lorica, or protective outer covering, that surrounds the cell. It is an oval shape with a narrow neck, and when it is dried out it becomes conical. The lorica is usually around 30 μm long from its base to the rib-like strands (costae) which stick out from the front. At its greatest diameter, it is 20 μm long. The inner chamber of the lorica is surrounded by two layers of costae. The outer layer is made of around twelve costae which wrap around the circumference of the chamber, each of which is made of eight strips, two of which stick out from the front. The inner layer is made of two or three costae which stretch down the length of the lorica, perpendicular to the outer costae. These lengthwise costae are made of strips equal in number to how many outer widthwise costae there are (typically twelve). The front most of the lengthwise costae is tight and constricted, appearing to have two strands. All of the strips of the lengthwise costae are roughly the same length, and they are only attached to the outer costae by one end. The costae consistently overlap in a rising counterclockwise manner (sinistrorse), but they overlap more towards the front. Slender, fiber-like structures (called "roots") are woven into a delicate mesh which stretches between the lengthwise and widthwise costae. The mesh bridges most of the open space between the costae, but its function is unknown. The mesh is made up of tiny 0.01 μm wide filaments, with pores between 0.05 and 0.5 μm in size. However, the mesh can only be seen under certain conditions, and during preparation for scanning electron microscope observation it appears to shrink, changing the shape of the lorica.

The protoplast (interior of the cell) is suspended in the center of the frame of the lorica. It sits approximately halfway between the front inner costa and the back inner costa, along the strips of the outer costae which are fourth from the tip. The back end of the protoplast is covered by a cup-shaped membrane. Other "roots" similar in appearance to those meshing the costae together attach the protoplast to the lorica from this membrane.

The species locomotes by a flagellum and numerous tentacles. The flagellum moves slowly and is sluggish, and always remains within the open end of the lorica. It is 11 μm long and is smooth. It oscillates back and forth, not in a circular motion, with a wavelength of 10 μm and amplitude of 8 μm. The tentacles can be retracted, but when they are all expanded there are more than fifty of them which can be up to 10 μm long. These tentacles almost reach the front inner costa, but they are never long enough to touch it. There is between 0.1 and 0.4 μm between each of the tentacles, depending on their location.

== Taxonomy ==
Diaphanoeca grandis is most closely related within its genus to D. sphaerica, but also shares similarities with Crinolina isefiordensis. Several species are loosely grouped in a "D. grandis cluster" within Diaphanoeca, including D. cylindrica, D. multiannulata, D. sphaerica, and D. spiralifurca.

== Distribution and habitat ==
Diaphanoeca grandis has a wide distribution. It can be found most frequently in the Northeast Atlantic, North American boreal waters, and the Southern Ocean. It has also been recorded from the Baltic Sea, Black Sea, Mediterranean Sea, the Arctic, the North Pacific, the Caribbean, and the coasts of Australia and the Eastern Pacific.

== Behavior ==
Diaphanoeca grandis is a filter feeder. It uses its flagellum to push water through its lorica, which acts as a kind of sieve. It allows particles of certain sizes inside, while keeping larger particles out. This is important because the species lacks the ability to reverse the flow of water to clear its inner filter collar, and if large particles were allowed in, the collar would quickly become clogged. The species is a micro-heterotroph that feeds on bacteria and detritus. It is capable of feeding on very small pieces of detrital carbon, which are usually only consumed by bacteria. It takes roughly 90 seconds to phagocytize a single bacterium and is capable of filtering approximately 5,000 times its own volume in one hour.

Diaphanoeca grandis sinks in a watery environment at a rate of approximately 0.6 μm per second. For a cell of its size and shape, the expected rate is slightly lower at 0.5 μm per second.

== Cultivation ==
While Diaphanoeca grandis is not a cultivated species, it has been noted that it could have use as food for the species of Tintinnopsis. Additionally, fragments of the lorica of D. grandis are capable of being used by Tintinnopsis in their own loricas.
