= Cladospongia elegans =

Scientific classification
- Domain: Eukaryota
- (unranked): Opisthokonta
- (unranked): Holozoa
- Class: Choanoflagellatea
- Order: Craspedida
- Family: Codonosigidae
- Genus: Cladospongia M.O.P.Iyengar & K.R.Ramanathan, 1940

Species
- Cladospongia elegans M.O.P.Iyengar & K.R.Ramanathan (type)

Species of single-celled organism

Cladospongia is a genus of choanoflagellate. The type species (C. elegans) is found in India (Madras).
