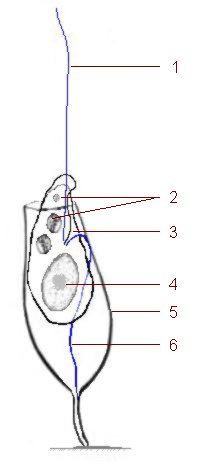
- Bicosoeca cell scheme: 1. anterior flagellum, 2. phagosomes, 3. cytostome, 4. nucleus, 5. lorica, 6. posterior flagellum

Scientific classification
- Domain: Eukaryota
- (unranked): SAR
- (unranked): Heterokonta
- Class: Bikosea
- Order: Bicosoecida
- Family: Bicosoecaceae Ritter von Stein, 1878

Genera
- Genus Bicosoeca Clark 1866; Genus Codonoeca Clark 1867; Genus Hedraeophysa Kent 1880

Synonyms
- Codonoecidae Kent 1880

= Bicosoecaceae =

Family of single-celled organisms

Bicosoecaceae is a family of bicosoecids in the order Bicosoecida.

The name of the type genus Bicosoeca described by James-Clark in 1866 is derived from Greek roots (bikos, vase, bowl, plus oekein, inhabit). The philologically preferable compound would be Bicoeca, as "corrected" by Stein in 1878 and followed by most subsequent authors. However, according to the ICBN and ICZN, the original spelling of the name cannot be considered incorrect and it must be used in its original form.
