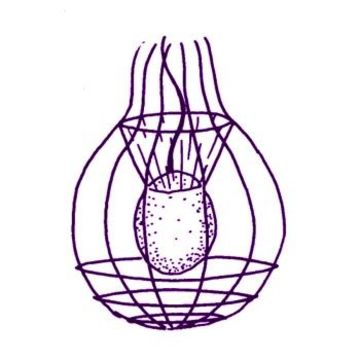
- Diagrammatic representation of Diaphanoeca grandis

Scientific classification
- Domain: Eukaryota
- Clade: Amorphea
- Class: Choanoflagellata
- Order: Acanthoecida
- Family: Acanthoecidae
- Genus: Diaphanoeca; W.Ellis, 1930

= Diaphanoeca =

Genus of protozoans

Diaphanoeca is a genus of choanoflagellates belonging to the family Acanthoecidae.

Species:

- Diaphanoeca aperta B.S.C.Leadbeater
- Diaphanoeca cylindrica B.S.C.Leadbeater
- Diaphanoeca fiordensis (R.F.Scagel & J.R.Stein) R.E.Norris
- Diaphanoeca grandis Ellis
- Diaphanoeca multiannulata Buck
- Diaphanoeca parva W.Ellis
- Diaphanoeca pedicellata Leadbeater
- Diaphanoeca sphaerica Thomsen
- Diaphanoeca undulata Thomsen
