= Calotheca =

Scientific classification
- Domain: Eukaryota
- Supergroup: Amorphea
- Clade: Obazoa
- Clade: Opisthokonta
- Clade: Holozoa
- Class: Choanoflagellata
- Order: Acanthoecida
- Family: Acanthoecidae
- Genus: Calotheca; H. A. Thomsen and O. Moestrup, 1983

Species
- Calotheca pallida (Bryant, 1945); Calotheca parvula (Weise, 1908)

Genus of choanoflagellates

Calotheca is the name used for a genus of choanoflagellates in the family Acanthoecidae, though this name is a junior homonym of the name Calotheca Heyden, 1887, and it must be replaced under the rules of the ICZN. The species C. alata is from Indo-Pacific Localities.
