= Acanthocorbis =

Scientific classification
- Domain: Eukaryota
- Class: Choanoflagellata
- Order: Acanthoecida
- Family: Acanthoecidae
- Genus: Acanthocorbis; S.Hara & E.Takahashi, 1984

Species
- See text

Synonyms
- Pseudomicrosportella

Genus of choanoflagellates

Acanthocorbis is a genus of choanoflagellates within the family Acanthoecidae.

== Species ==
- Acanthocorbis apoda (Leadbeater) Hara & Takahashi, 1984
- Acanthocorbis asymmetrica (Thomsen) Hara & Takahashi, 1984
- Acanthocorbis camarensis Hara et al., 1996
- Acanthocorbis campanula (Espeland) Thomsen, 1991
- Acanthocorbis haurakiana Thomsen, 1991
- Acanthocorbis nana Thomsen, Garrison & Kosman, 1991
- Acanthocorbis prolongata Thomsen, Garrison & Kosman, 1997
- Acanthocorbis tinnabulum Marchant et al., 1987
- Acanthocorbis tintinnabulum Marchant, van den Hoff & Burton, 1987
- Acanthocorbis unguiculata (Thomsen) Hara & Takahashi, 1984
- Acanthocorbis weddellensis Thomsen, Garrison & Kosman, 1997
