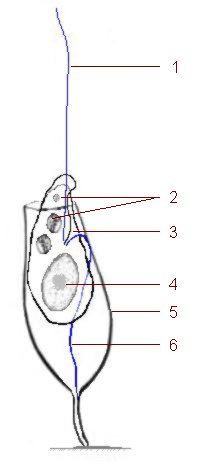
- Bicosoeca cell scheme: 1. anterior flagellum, 2. phagosomes, 3. cytostome, 4. nucleus, 5. lorica, 6. posterior flagellum

Scientific classification
- Domain: Eukaryota
- (unranked): SAR
- (unranked): Heterokonta
- Class: Bikosea
- Order: Bicosoecida
- Family: Bicosoecaceae
- Genus: Bicosoeca James-Clark, 1866

Species
- see text

Synonyms
- Bikoeca (sic) Stein, 1878; Bicoeca (sic) Senn, 1900; Codomonas Lackey 1939; Domatomonas Lackey 1939; Poteriodendron von Stein 1878; Stephanocodon Pascher 1942

= Bicosoeca =

Genus of single-celled organisms

Bicosoeca is a genus of bicosoecids in the family Bicosoecaceae.

It is the type genus of its family. The name Bicosoeca, described by James-Clark in 1866, is derived from Greek roots (bikos, vase, bowl, plus oekein, inhabit). The philologically preferable compound would be Bicoeca, as "corrected" by Stein in 1878 and followed by most subsequent authors. However, according to the ICBN and ICZN, the original spelling of the name cannot be considered incorrect and it must be used in its original form.

== Species ==
- Bicosoeca accreta Hibberd 1978
- Bicosoeca acuminata Stokes 1885
- Bicosoeca antarctica Pankow 1991
- Bicosoeca dissimilis Stokes 1885
- Bicosoeca lauterbornei
- Bicosoeca lepteca Stokes 1885
- Bicosoeca leptostoma Stokes 1885
- Bicosoeca longipes Stokes 1885
- Bicosoeca mignotii Moestrup, Thomsen & Hibberd 1992
- Bicosoeca phiala Stokes 1895
- Bicosoeca ruttneri Wawrik
- Bicosoeca socialis Lemmermann 1908 non Lauterborn 1894 non Kent 1871
- Bicosoeca starmachii Hamar 1979
- Bicosoeca szabadosii Hamar
- Bicosoeca tenuis Kent 1880
- Bicosoeca section Poteriodendron (von Stein 1878) Bourrelly 1951
  - Bicosoeca dinobryoidea Lemmermann 1914
  - Bicosoeca petiolata (von Stein 1878) Pringsheim 1947
- Bicosoeca section Stephanocodon (Pascher 1942) Bourrelly 1951
  - Bicosoeca campanulata (Lackey 1942) Bourrelly 1953 em. Skuja 1956
  - Bicosoeca irregularis (Pascher 1942) Bourrelly 1951
  - Bicosoeca socialis Lauterborn 1894 non Lemmermann 1908
  - Bicosoeca stellata Bourrelly 1951
- Bicosoeca section Codomonas (Lackey 1939) Bourrelly 1951
  - Bicosoeca ainikkiae Järnefelt 1956
  - Bicosoeca alaskana Hilliard 1971
  - Bicosoeca annulata (Lackey 1939) Bourrelly 1951
  - Bicosoeca crystallina Skuja 1956
  - Bicosoeca cylindrica (Lackey 1939) Bourrelly 1951
  - Bicosoeca depoucquesiana Bourrelly 1951
  - Bicosoeca fottii Bourrelly 1951
  - Bicosoeca kenaiensis (Hilliard 1971) Yubukia et al. 2015
  - Bicosoeca mitra Fott 1946
  - Bicosoeca paropsis Skuja 1956
  - Bicosoeca planctonica Kisselew 1931
  - Bicosoeca turrigera Nygaard 1949
  - Bicosoeca urceolata Fott 1941
- Bicosoeca section Eubicoeca Bourrelly 1951
  - Bicosoeca borealis Hilliard 1971
  - Bicosoeca conica Lemmermann 1914
  - Bicosoeca epiphytica Hilliard 1971
  - Bicosoeca eurystoma Hilliard 1971
  - Bicosoeca exilis Penard 1921
  - Bicosoeca gracilipes James-Clark 1867
  - Bicosoeca kepneri Reynolds 1927
  - Bicosoeca lacustris James-Clark 1867
  - Bicosoeca maris Picken 1941
  - Bicosoeca mediterranea Pavillard 1916
  - Bicosoeca oculata Zacharias 1894
  - Bicosoeca ovata Lemmermann 1914
  - Bicosoeca parva Hilliard 1971
  - Bicosoeca pontica Valkanov 1970
  - Bicosoeca synoica Skuja 1956
  - Bicosoeca vacillans
