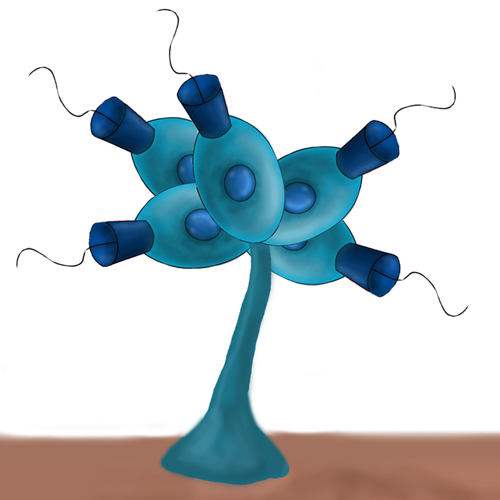
- Proterospongia colonial diagram

Scientific classification
- Domain: Eukaryota
- Supergroup: Amorphea
- Clade: Obazoa
- Clade: Opisthokonta
- Clade: Holozoa
- Class: Choanoflagellata
- Order: Craspedida
- Family: Codonosigidae
- Genus: Proterospongia; William Saville Kent

Type species
- Proterospongia heackelii (Also the Model Species) William Saville-Kent

Species
- Proterospongia heackelii Proterospongia nana Proterospongia spina Proterospongia skujae Proterospongia choanojuncta Proterospongia dybsoeënsis

Synonyms
- Protospongia, William Saville Kent, 1880-1882 (See text for context)

= Proterospongia =

Genus of colony-forming single-celled organisms

Proterospongia (Formerly Protospongia) is a genus of single-celled aquatic organisms which form colonies. It belongs to the choanoflagellate class. As a colony-forming choanoflagellate, Proterospongia is of interest to scientists studying the mechanisms of intercellular signaling and adhesion present before animals appeared.

It used to and was originally called Protospongia by William Saville Kent but the name was changed to Proterospongia by William Saville Kent as Protospongia was already taken before for the genus which William Saville Kent later realized

== Physical characteristics ==
Members of Proterospongia have the typical choanoflagellate cell structure characterized by a cell body 5-10μm in diameter with a 20-30μm apical flagellum surrounded by a collar of 15-25 actin-filled microvilli. The flagellum propels swimming cells through the water column and creates water currents through the microvilli, which trap foodstuff such as bacteria and detritus. The arrangement of organelles in Proterospongia appears consistent with other choanoflagellates and is characterized by an anterior dictyosome under the flagellar base, a central nucleus, peripheral mitochondria and a posterior food vacuole.

As a member of the Codonosigidae family, Proterospongia have only a fine investment that is indistinct by light microscopy or completely lack an outer-covering. Proterospongia species are distinguished by colony morphology, which vary from simple chains of cells to striking astral assemblages. Colonies having extracellular jelly or mucilage have been described by Kent, Lackey, and Leadbeater; however the composition of this substance is unknown. Kent also described a Proterospongia species containing two types of cells embedded in mucilage; however, this is the only account of such a species and it has been suggested that the observed amoeboid cells were actually posterior tentacles that are present on some choanoflagellates.

== Life history ==
Although several Proterospongia species have been described, only P. choanojuncta has a described life history. Based on this description, Proterospongia alternates between colonial, Swimming and adherent solitary states. Leadbeater’s 1983 description resulted in the consolidation of Choanocea perplexea and Proterospongia choanojuncta species into Proterospongia choanojuncta. Additional studies of solitary and colonial species may result in further species consolidation.

== Classification ==
Proterospongia is a taxonomic classification of colonial Codonosigidae choanoflagellates based on the physical appearance of individual cells and the morphology of the colony. First described by Kent in Manual of the Infusoria (1880-1882) as Protospongia, there are six described species of Proterospongia and the colony structure varies between species. The members of Proterospongia genus remain to be classified in a phylogenetic framework.

== See also ==
- Evolution of eukaryotes

== Additional references ==
1. Dawkins, Richard (2005), The Ancestor's Tale: A Pilgrimage to the Dawn of Evolution, Houghton Mifflin Harcourt, ISBN 978-0-618-61916-0
2. James, T. Y., F. Kauff, C. L. Schoch, et al. mult. 2006. Reconstructing the early evolution of Fungi using a six-gene phylogeny. Nature 443:818-22.
3. Lang, B. F., C. O'Kelly, T. Nerad, M. W. Gray, and G. Burger. 2002. The closest unicellular relatives of animals. Curr Biol 12:1773-8.
4. Philippe, H, Snell, EA, Bapteste, E, Lopez, P, Holland, PWH, and D Casane. 2004. Phylogenomics of eukaryotes: the impact of missing data on alignments. Molecular Biology and Evolution. 21(9):123-135.
5. Snell, EA, Furlong, RF, and PWH Holland. 2001. Hsp70 sequences indicate that choanoflagellates are closely related to animals. Current Biology. 11:967-970.
