= Cussonia holstii =

Scientific classification
- Kingdom: Plantae
- Clade: Tracheophytes
- Clade: Angiosperms
- Clade: Eudicots
- Clade: Asterids
- Order: Apiales
- Family: Araliaceae
- Genus: Cussonia
- Species: C. holstii

Binomial name
- Cussonia holstii Harms ex Engl.

Species of plant

Cussonia holstii is a small to medium size tree belonging to the family Araliaceae. The tree is similar in shape to a paw paw tree.

== Description ==
The species can grow up to 20 m tall, the trunk is straight and can reach 1 m in diameter. Its bark is fissured and scaly and commonly dark greyish in color. The species has digitately compound adult leaves clustered at the end of branches, with 3-7 leaflets that are broadly ovate in outline with a crenate margin; the apex is acuminate while the base is cuneate to cordate. Petiole is present and up to 40 cm long. Flowers are in spikes, green to yellow in color, can be up to 30 together at the apex of branches.

== Distribution ==
The species occurs in East Africa from Somalia southwards to Tanzania.

== Uses ==
A decoction of leaf extracts is used in traditional medicine to treat abdominal pain while a bark decoction is used during child birth to clean the uterus and expel the placenta. Leaves are also used as fodder for goats.

Wood is soft and used to make doors and beehives.
