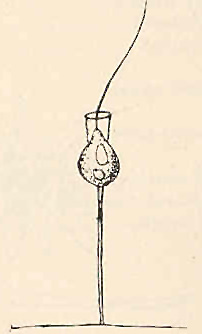
- Codonosiga botrytis

Scientific classification
- Domain: Eukaryota
- Supergroup: Amorphea
- Clade: Obazoa
- Clade: Opisthokonta
- Clade: Holozoa
- Class: Choanoflagellata
- Order: Craspedida
- Family: Codonosigidae
- Genus: Codonosiga; F.Stein, 1878

Type species
- C. pulcherrima H.J.Clark, 1866

Species
- 20 species: C. allioides W.S.Kent, 1881; C. assimilis W.S.Kent, 1881; C. botrytis W.S.Kent, 1880; C. botrytis (Ehrenberg) Bütschli, 1878; C. candelabrum W.S.Kent, 1881; C. corymbosa (Entz) Bourr.; C. cymosa W.S.Kent, 1881; C. dichotoma A.Stokes, 1883; C. echinata W.S.Kent, 1871; C. florea A.Stokes, 1884; C. furcata W.S.Kent, 1881; C. gracilis (Kent, 1880) De Saedeleer, 1927; C. grossularia W.S.Kent, 1881; C. longipes A.Stokes, 1883; C. magnifica A.Stokes, 1885; C. pulcherrima H.J.Clark, 1866; C. pyriformis W.S.Kent, 1881; C. steinii W.S.Kent, 1881; C. umbellata (Tatem) W.S.Kent, 1881; C. utriculus A.Stokes, 1885

Synonyms
- 1 synonym: Codosiga H.J.Clark 1866 (Note: As Codonosiga is an illegitimate name, it has generally been accepted as a synonym of the accepted name, Codosiga. To avoid identifying Codonosiga as a synonym of itself, it has been necessary to incorrectly identify Codosiga as a synonym of Codonosiga)

= Codonosiga =

Genus of choanoflagellates

Schematic of a Codonosiga cell: 1. Flagellum; 2. Food particles; 3. Plasma collar; 4. Cell nucleus; 5. Food vacuole; 6. Attached to the substrate

The genus name Codonosiga F.Stein, 1878 is a Nomen illegitimum, an illegitimate name. The accepted name is Codosiga H.J.Clark, 1866, Codonosiga is a synonym of this accepted name.

The genus is included in the family Codonosigidae within the class Choanoflagellata.

== Etymology ==
The genus name derives from two ancient Greek words, "κώδων" (kṓdōn) meaning bell, and "σιγή" (sigḗ) meaning silent. The name means silent bell.

== Taxonomy ==
The genus was first described, in 1866, by US naturalist Henry James-Clark, (Note: Born Henry James Clark he changed his name to the hyphenated Henry James-Clark) using the name Codosiga. In 1878 the German zoologist Samuel Friedrich Stein (also Friedrich von Stein) introduced the genus name Codonosiga.

The earlier name, Codosiga, has priority, and is the accepted name. The later name, Codonosiga, is an illegitimate name, and is recognised as a synonym of the accepted name.
