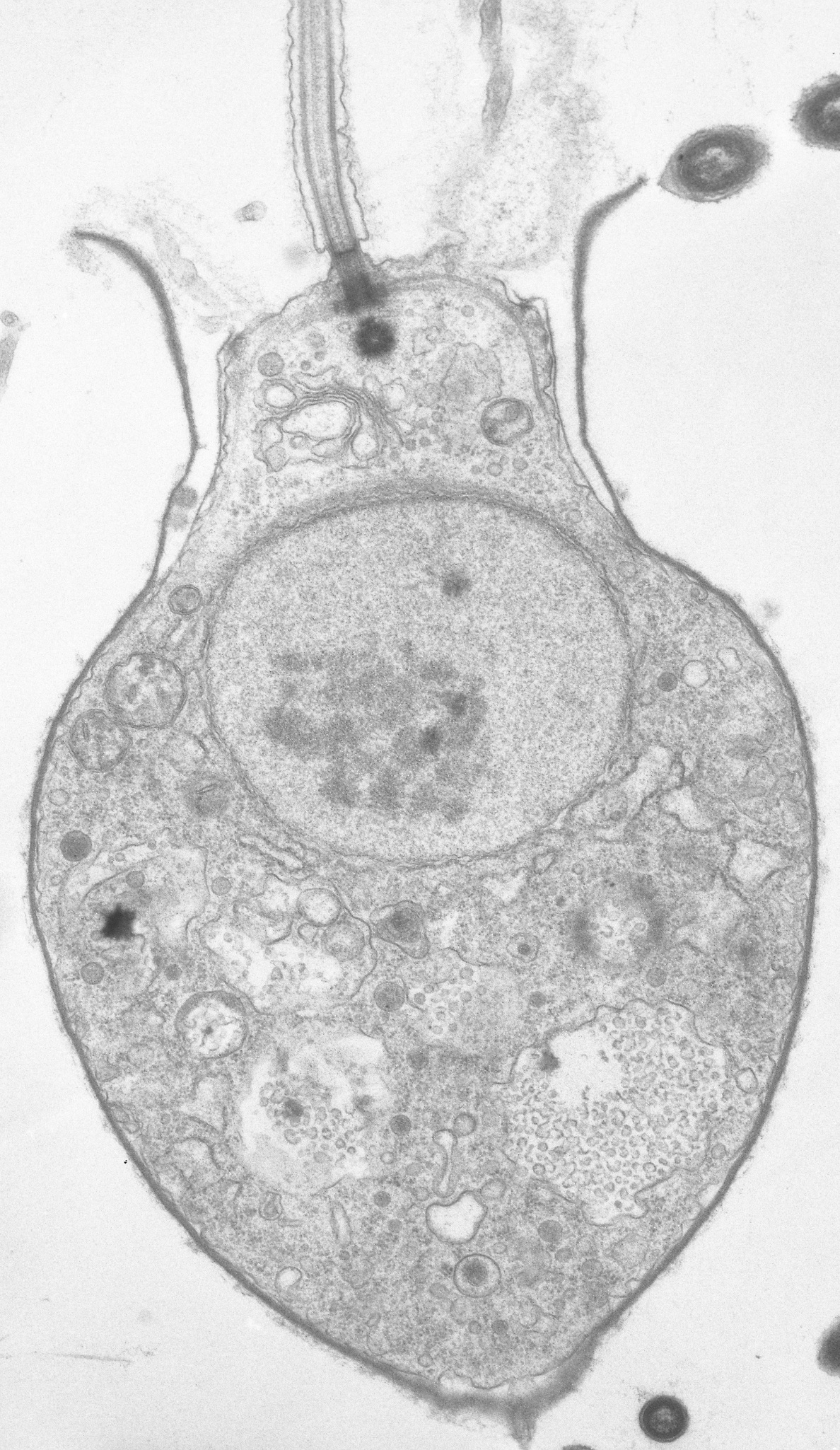
- Salpingoeca sp., in transmission electron microscopy (TEM)

Scientific classification
- Domain: Eukaryota
- Supergroup: Amorphea
- Clade: Obazoa
- Clade: Opisthokonta
- Clade: Holozoa
- Class: Choanoflagellata
- Order: Craspedida
- Family: Salpingoecidae
- Genus: Salpingoeca; James-Clark, 1866

Species
- Salpingoeca aggregata Valkanov; Salpingoeca amphoridium James-Clark; Salpingoeca ampullacea D. de C. Bicudo & C. E. de M. Bicudo; Salpingoeca ampulloides D. de C. Bicudo & C. E. de M. Bicudo; Salpingoeca butschlii Lemmermann; Salpingoeca caudiculata D.C.Bicudo & C.E.M.Bicudo; Salpingoeca clarkii Stein; Salpingoeca collaris Stokes; Salpingoeca convallaria Stein; Salpingoeca frequentissima (Zacharias) Lemmermann, 1913; Salpingoeca gracilis Clark; Salpingoeca inquillata Kent; Salpingoeca lefevrei Bourrelly; Salpingoeca marina James-Clark; Salpingoeca minuta Kent; Salpingoeca rosetta Dayel et al., 2011; Salpingoeca pyxidium Kent; Salpingoeca vaginicola Stein

= Salpingoeca =

Genus of choanoflagellates

Salpingoeca is a genus of choanoflagellates in the family Salpingoecidae. The species Salpingoeca rosetta is relatively well characterized.
