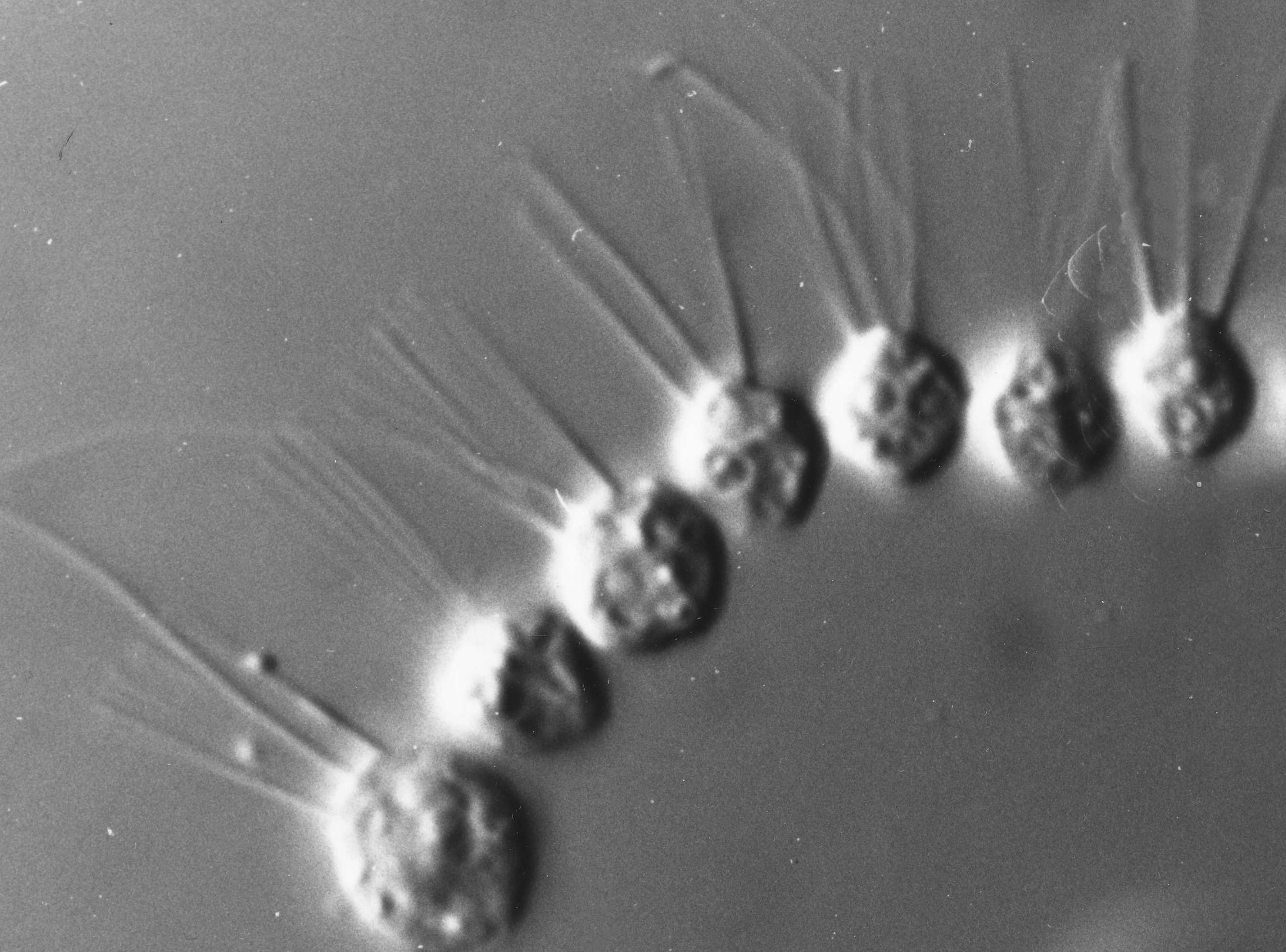

Scientific classification
- Domain: Eukaryota
- Clade: Obazoa
- Clade: Opisthokonta
- Class: Choanoflagellata
- Order: Craspedida
- Family: Codonosigaceae
- Genus: Desmarella
- Species: D. moniliformis

Binomial name
- Desmarella moniliformis Kent, 1878

= Desmarella moniliformis =

Species of choanoflagellate

Desmarella moniliformis is a species of colonial choanoflagellate belonging to the family Codonosigidae.

The species is found in the northern parts of the Atlantic and northeastern parts of the Pacific near the United Kingdom, Belgium, and Sweden.

The morphology and structure of D. moniliformis colonies consist of a single, slightly curved ribbon-like row composed of around 2 to 20 cells; with an average of 8 cells per colony. Cells have a typical ovoid form; the average body size is 7.3 μm in length and 5.7 μm in width.

D. moniliformis primarily feeds on bacteria and certain algae, acting to break down organic material and recycle minerals in the microbial food web.
