= Cussonia sphaerocephala =

Scientific classification
- Kingdom: Plantae
- Clade: Tracheophytes
- Clade: Angiosperms
- Clade: Eudicots
- Clade: Asterids
- Order: Apiales
- Family: Araliaceae
- Genus: Cussonia
- Species: C. sphaerocephala

Binomial name
- Cussonia sphaerocephala Thunb.

Species of tree

Cussonia sphaerocephala is a species of tree in the family Araliaceae. It is known as the Natal forest cabbage tree; in Afrikaans it is called the Natalse boskiepersol, and in isiZulu as umsenge.

== Description ==
The distinctive leaves are twice compound arranged in neat circular heads.

== Habitat ==
It grows on the subtropical coast of South Africa.

== Ecology ==
The larva of the cabbage tree emperor moth (Bunaea alcinoe) feed on the leaves.
