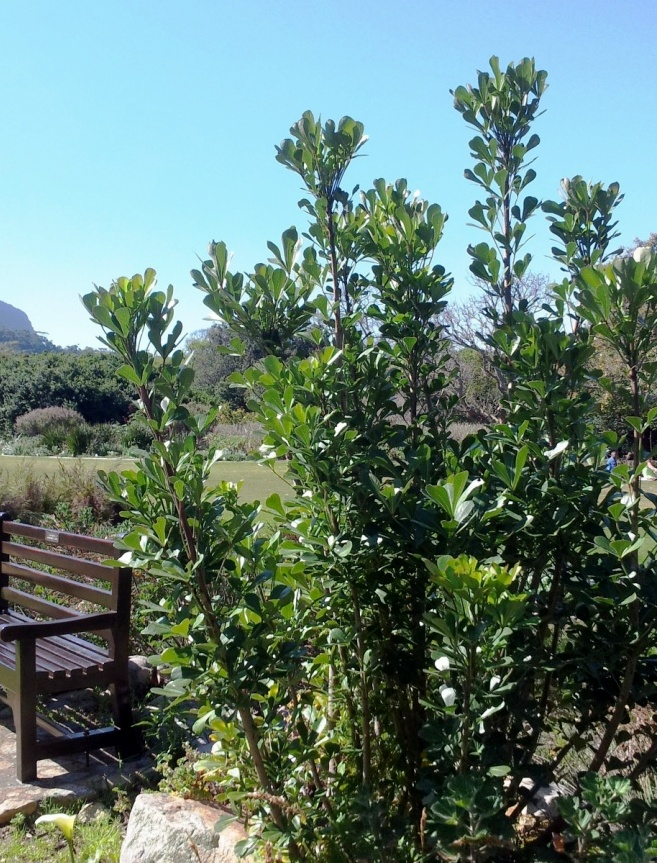
- A small C. thyrsiflora specimen in cultivation

Scientific classification
- Kingdom: Plantae
- Clade: Tracheophytes
- Clade: Angiosperms
- Clade: Eudicots
- Clade: Asterids
- Order: Apiales
- Family: Araliaceae
- Genus: Cussonia
- Species: C. thyrsiflora

Binomial name
- Cussonia thyrsiflora Thunb.

= Cussonia thyrsiflora =

Cape coast cabbage tree

Species of tree

Cussonia thyrsiflora, known as the Cape coast cabbage tree, or Kaapse kuskiepersol in Afrikaans, is a small evergreen tree in the family Araliaceae.

== Range ==
It naturally occurs in South Africa along the southern Cape coast, between Cape Town and Port Elizabeth.

== Habit ==
It can be grown as an attractive shrub or tree for coastal gardens, as it can withstand beach soils and winds. However, it also thrives in acidic or clay soils. It is normally a thick evergreen shrub with bisexual yellow flowers and black fruits, however it can be pruned to allow it to grow as a proper tree of up to 5 meters.

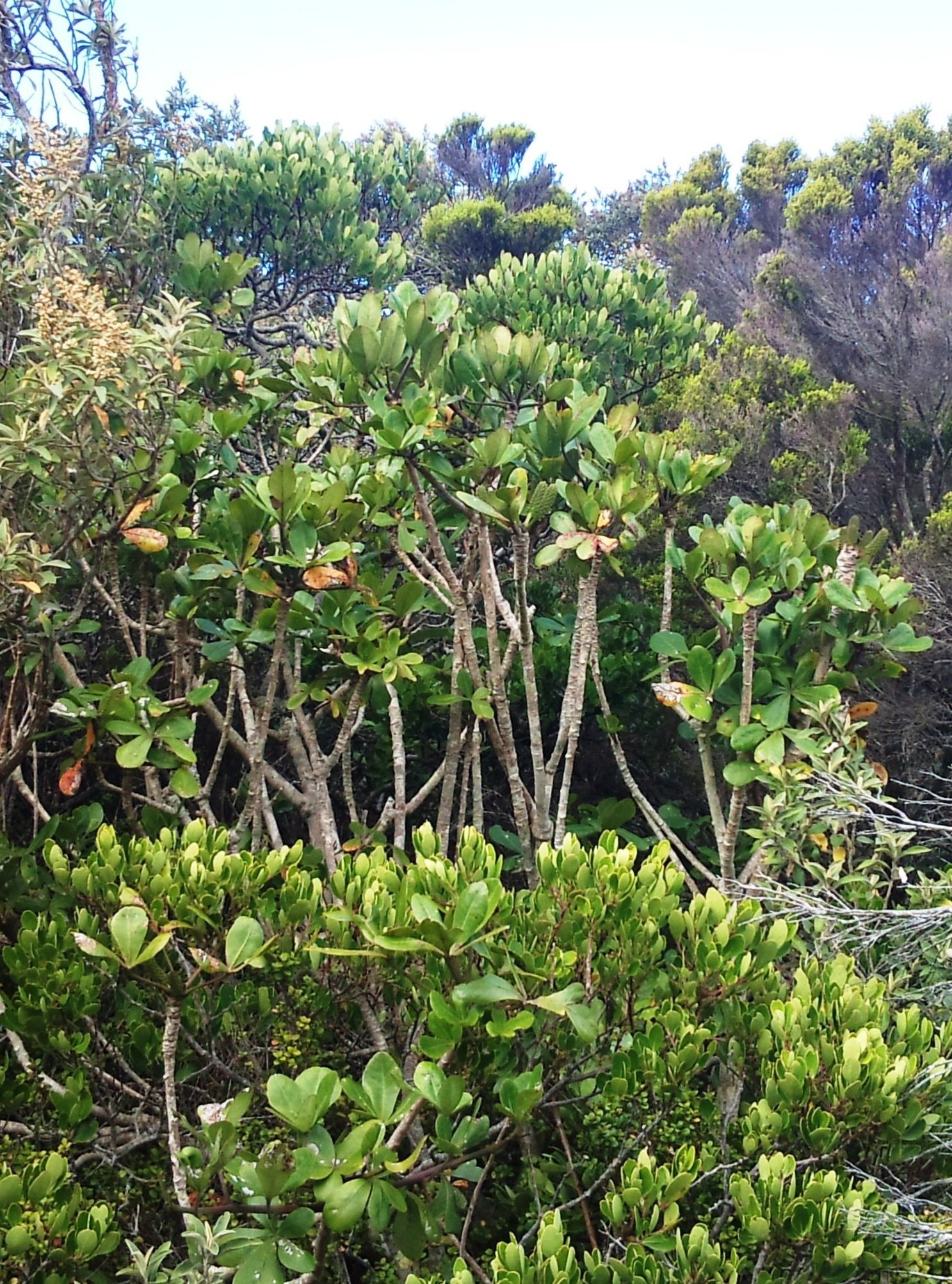
Upright stems of C. thyrsiflora, with foliage clustered at their tips
