= Cussonia bancoensis =

Scientific classification
- Kingdom: Plantae
- Clade: Tracheophytes
- Clade: Angiosperms
- Clade: Eudicots
- Clade: Asterids
- Order: Apiales
- Family: Araliaceae
- Genus: Cussonia
- Species: C. bancoensis

Binomial name
- Cussonia bancoensis Aubrév. & Pellegr.

Species of tree

Cussonia bancoensis, commonly called the aky tree, is a montane rainforest tree of the ginsing, or ivy family (Araliaceae) Believed to be originally endemic to Ghana, but now feral throughout tropical West Africa It is up to 40 metres (130 ft) height, with few branches, mostly vertical reiterations, each topped with a rosette of large five-pointed palmate leaves. The flowers are malodorous, and pollinated by flies. The wood is rich in potassium, and the ash is favored in making soap.
