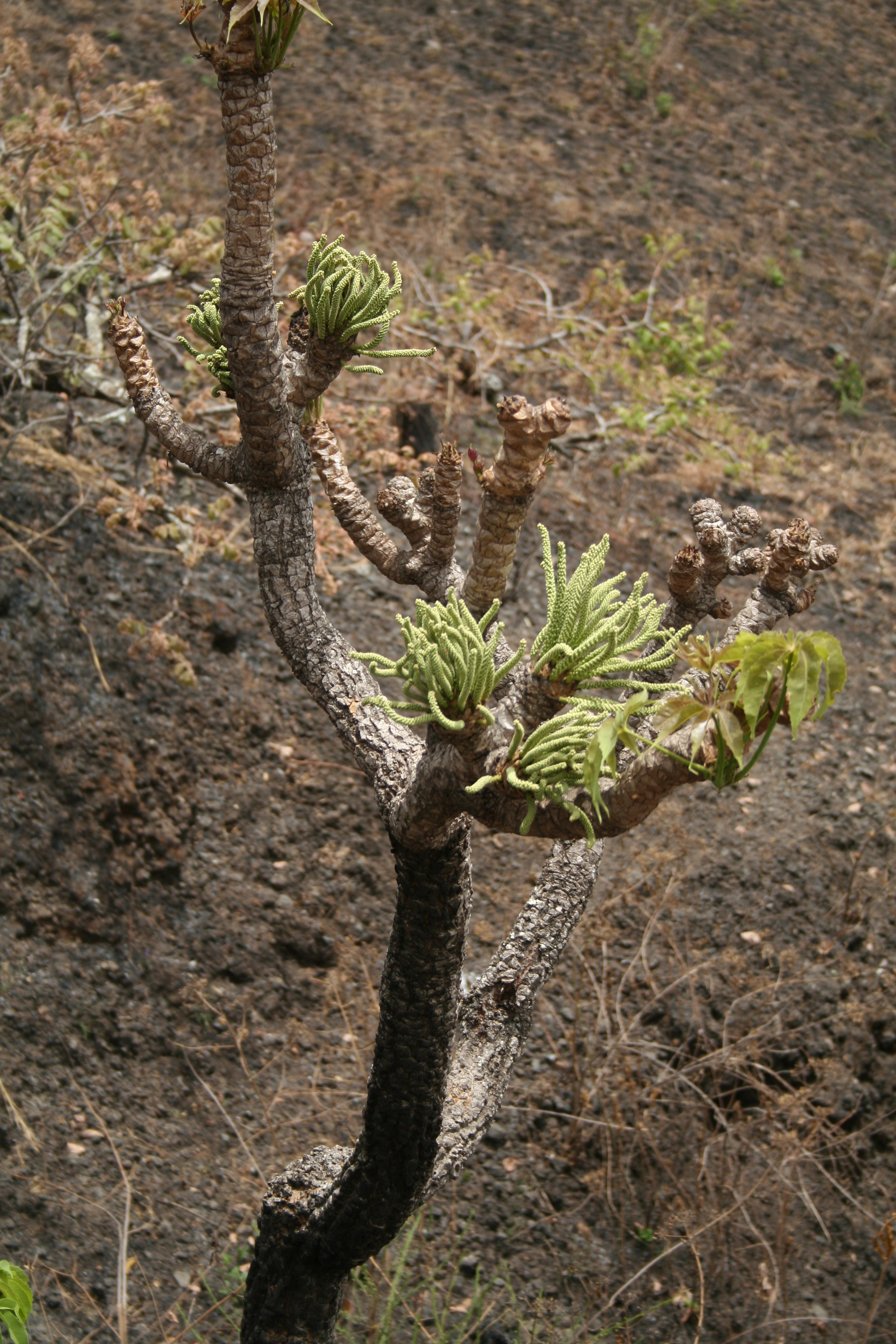

Scientific classification
- Kingdom: Plantae
- Clade: Tracheophytes
- Clade: Angiosperms
- Clade: Eudicots
- Clade: Asterids
- Order: Apiales
- Family: Araliaceae
- Genus: Cussonia
- Species: C. arborea

Binomial name
- Cussonia arborea Hochst. ex A.Rich.

= Cussonia arborea =

Species of plant

Cussonia arborea is a deciduous small to medium sized tree within the family Araliaceae. Extracts of the species are widely used in traditional medicine to treat a variety of ailments.

== Description ==
A multi-branched tree, the species can reach a height of 15 m, while its trunk can reach 45 cm in diameter. The bark is thick, corky and deeply furrowed, grey to dark grey in color. The leaves are palmately compound, with 3-9 leaflets or it can be simple, leaves are deeply lobed when mature and tend to have a leathery glabrous to glabrescent upper surface, its young leaves tend to be tomentose; leaflets are 6-30 cm long and 2-18 cm wide. Leaflets are obovate to elliptical in outline, the margin is commonly entire to crenate and the apex tend to be acute or acuminate while the base tend to be cuneate. Flowers are in umbels of spikes that points to different directions, up to 15 spikes per umbel, the fruit is globose or ovoid in shape, dark purple and up to 5 mm long.

== Distribution ==
The species is widely distributed in West, Central and East Africa. From Guinea and Senegal in West Africa westwards to Eritrea and Ethiopia in the horn of Africa and southwards to Zimbabwe. It occurs in open forests, woodlands and savannahs.

== Chemistry ==
Rutin and quinic acid esters have been isolated from the methanol extracts of the species. Triterpene saponins, including Cussonosides A and B have been isolated from the species.

== Uses ==
Bark decoction is used to treat malaria in Nigeria. In Ghana, Malawi and Zimbabwe, extracts are used to treat mental health related issues. Its leaves are used in a decoction to treat rheumatism and oedema. A water decoction of bark extracts is used as a topical treatment of gonorrhea and a root decoction is drunk for the treatment of diarrhea.
