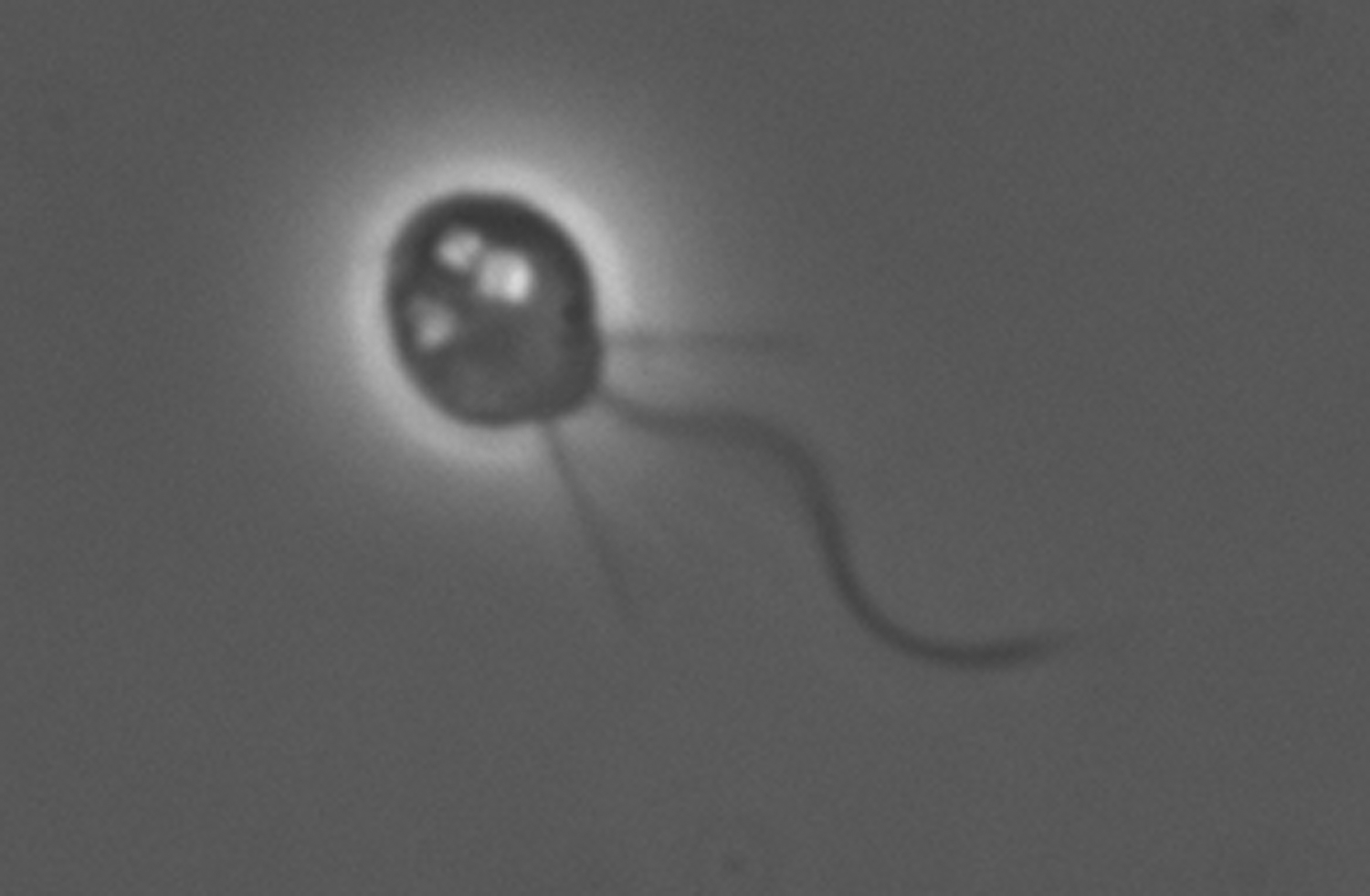
- phase contrast image of Monosiga brevicollis

Scientific classification
- Domain: Eukaryota
- Supergroup: Amorphea
- Clade: Obazoa
- Clade: Opisthokonta
- Clade: Holozoa
- Class: Choanoflagellata
- Order: Craspedida; Cavalier-Smith, 1997, emend. Nitsche et al. 2011

Families
- Codonosigidae; Salpingoecidae

= Craspedida =

Craspedida Temporal range: 422.78–0 Ma

Order of single-celled organisms

Craspedida is an order of choanoflagellate, with members with an exclusively organic covering. Crown group craspedids (and perhaps crown group choanoflagellates if Acanthoecida arose within Craspedida) appeared 422.78 million years ago, although a previous study from 2017 recovered the divergence of the crown group choanoflagellates (craspedids) at 786.62 million years.

== Subgroups ==
- Codonosigidae
  - Codosiga
  - Desmarella
  - Kentrosiga
  - Monosiga
  - Proterospongia
  - Sphaeroeca
  - Stylochromonas
- Salpingoecidae
  - Astrosiga
  - Aulomonas
  - Choanoeca
  - Cladospongia
  - Codonosigopsis
  - Diplosiga
  - Hartaetosiga
  - Mylnosiga
  - Lagenoeca
  - Microstomoeca
  - Paramonosiga
  - Salpingoeca
  - Stagondoeca

=== Cladogram ===
The following cladogram is based on the 2014 study by Leadbeater.

- Choanoflagellata
  - Acanthoecida
  - Craspedida
    - Codonosigidae
      - Codonosiga
        - Codonosiga botrytis
        - Codonosiga elegans
      - Desmarella
      - Kentrosiga
      - Monosiga
      - Proterospongia
      - Sphaeroeca
      - Stylochromonas
    - Salpingoecidae
      - Astrosiga
      - Aulomonas
      - Choanoeca
      - Cladospongia
      - Codonosigopsis
      - Diplosiga
      - Hartaetosiga
      - Mylnosiga
      - Lagenoeca
      - Microstomoeca
      - Paramonosiga
      - Salpingoeca
      - Stagondoeca
