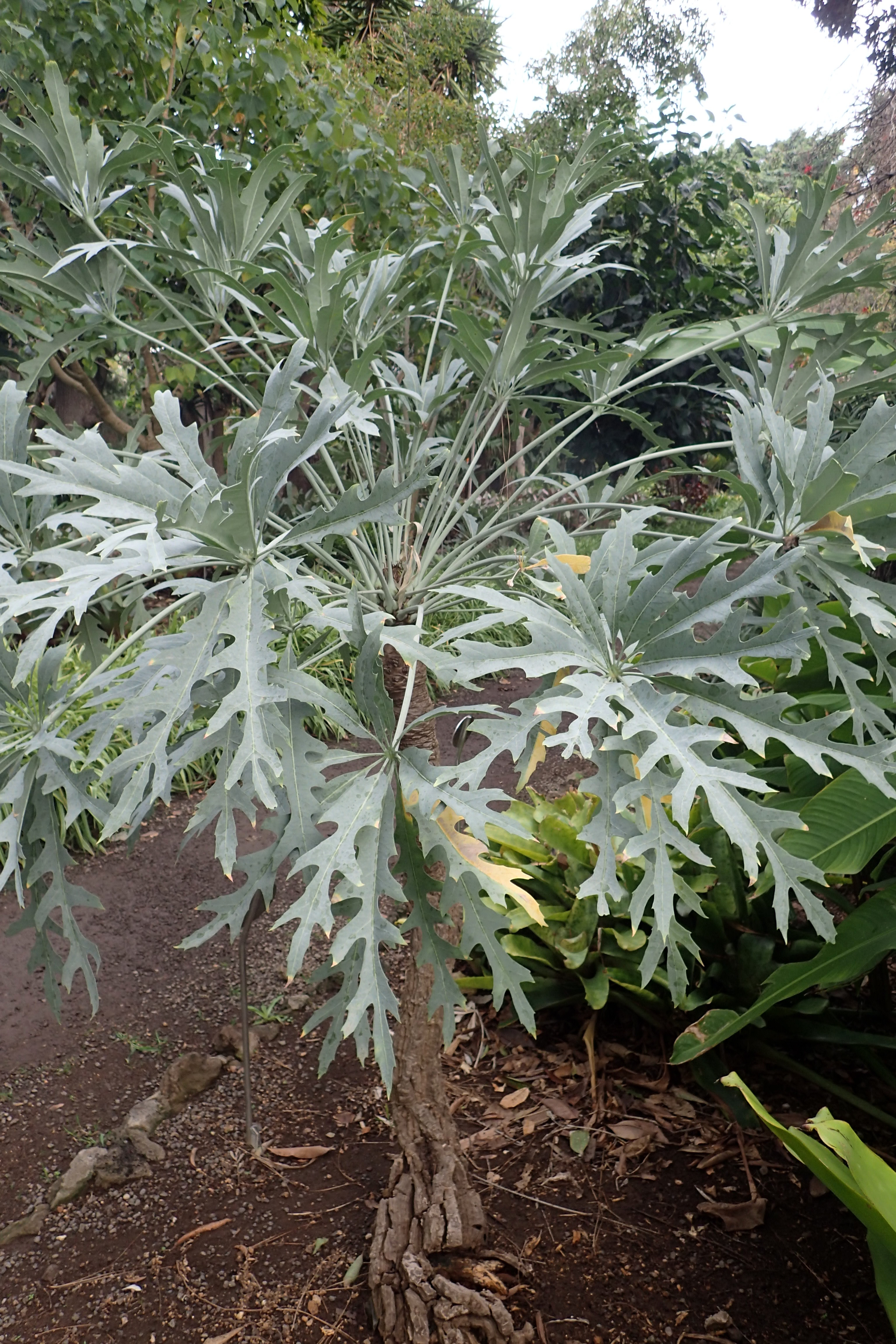
- Cussonia paniculata

Scientific classification
- Kingdom: Plantae
- Clade: Tracheophytes
- Clade: Angiosperms
- Clade: Eudicots
- Clade: Asterids
- Order: Apiales
- Family: Araliaceae
- Subfamily: Aralioideae
- Genus: Cussonia; Thunb.

Species
- See text

Synonyms
- Sphaerodendron Seem.

= Cussonia =

Cabbage trees

Genus of flowering plants

Cussonia is a genus of plants of the family Araliaceae, which is native to the Afrotropics. It originated in Africa and has its center of distribution in South Africa and the Mascarene Islands. Due to their striking habit, they are a conspicuous and easily recognizable group of plants. Their genus name commemorates the botanist Pierre Cusson. The Afro-Malagasy and Asian Schefflera, and Afrotropical Seemannaralia genera are related taxa that share several of its morphological characteristics, among which the leaves borne on the end of branches, inflorescences carried on terminal branches or stems, and reduced leaf complexity in developing inflorescences.

== Range and habitat ==
They occur in grasslands, woodlands and forests, from sea level to over 2,000 metres in altitude. Geographically, they are indigenous to sub-Saharan Africa, Yemen in the Arabian Peninsula and the Comoro Islands.

== Habit and morphology ==
They are squat to lanky shrubs and trees with a palm-like habit. Their leaves are typically grouped in umbrella-shaped arrangements at the tips of long erect branches. The leaves are carried on long petioles, and have conspicuous stipules. The leaves are very variable in shape, often palmately compound (cf. subgenus Paniculata Strey) with leaflets likewise variable in shape, but also simple or palmate. Their usually dense inflorescences are often spiked, and their small flowers usually have 5 greenish petals. Their stems and underground parts are succulent, and their bark is often corky. These plants are best grown from seed. These plants can handle an occasional and mild frost, but a chill will make the leaves fall off.

== Species ==
There are some 20 to 22 species:

- Cussonia angolensis (Seem.) Hiern
- Cussonia arborea Hochst. ex A.Rich.
- Cussonia arenicola Strey
- Cussonia bancoensis Aubrév. & Pellegr.
- Cussonia brieyi De Wild.
- Cussonia corbisieri De Wild.
- Cussonia gamtoosensis Strey
- Cussonia holstii Harms ex Engl.
- Cussonia jatrophoides Hutchinson & E.A.Bruce
- Cussonia natalensis Sond.
- Cussonia nicholsonii Strey
- Cussonia ostinii Chiov.
- Cussonia paniculata Eckl. & Zeyh.
- Cussonia sessilis Lebrun
- Cussonia sphaerocephala Strey
- Cussonia spicata Thunb.
- Cussonia thyrsiflora Thunb.
- Cussonia transvaalensis Reyneke
- Cussonia zimmermannii Harms
- Cussonia zuluensis Strey

== Gallery ==
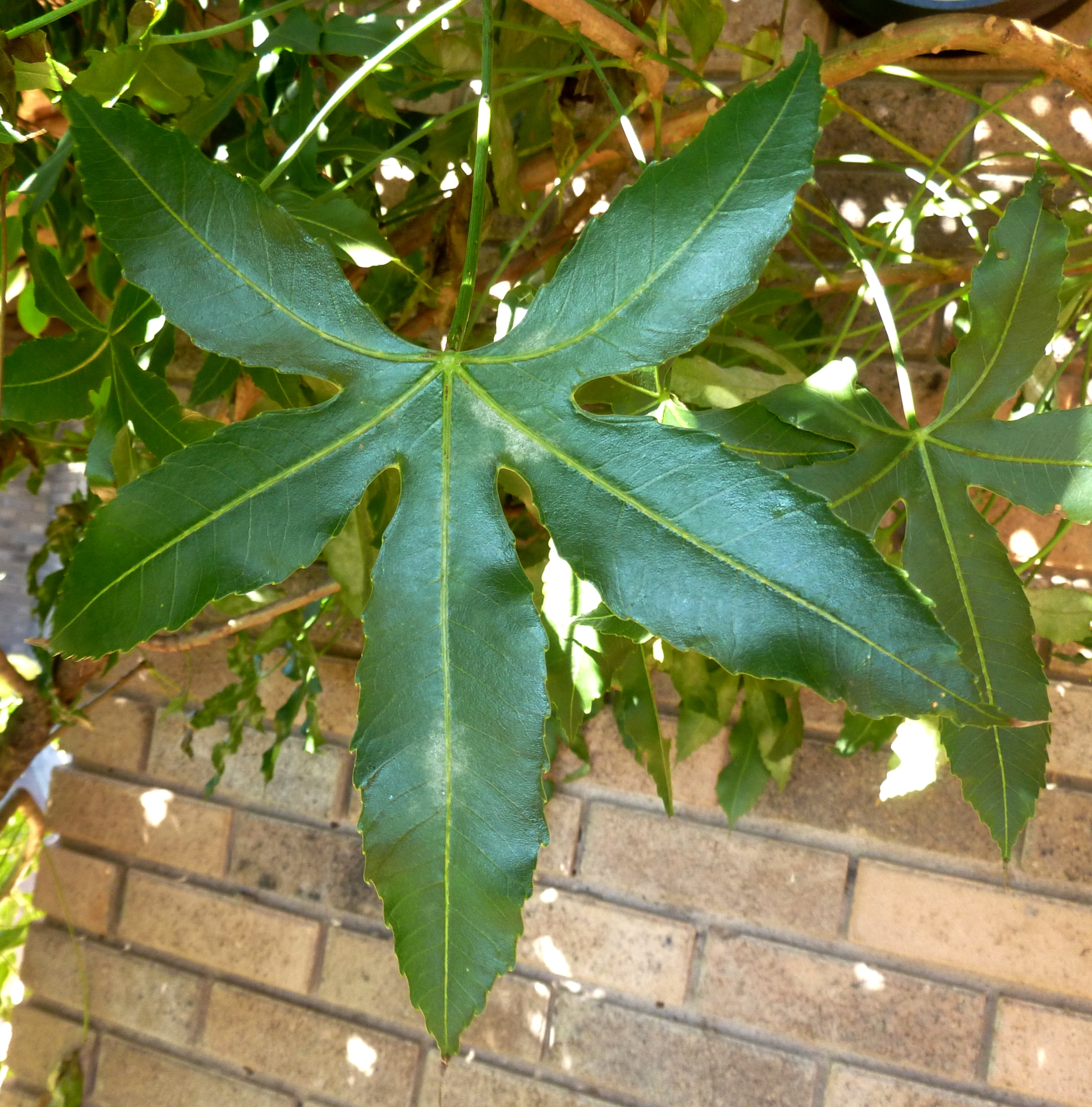
Palmate leaf of Cussonia natalensis

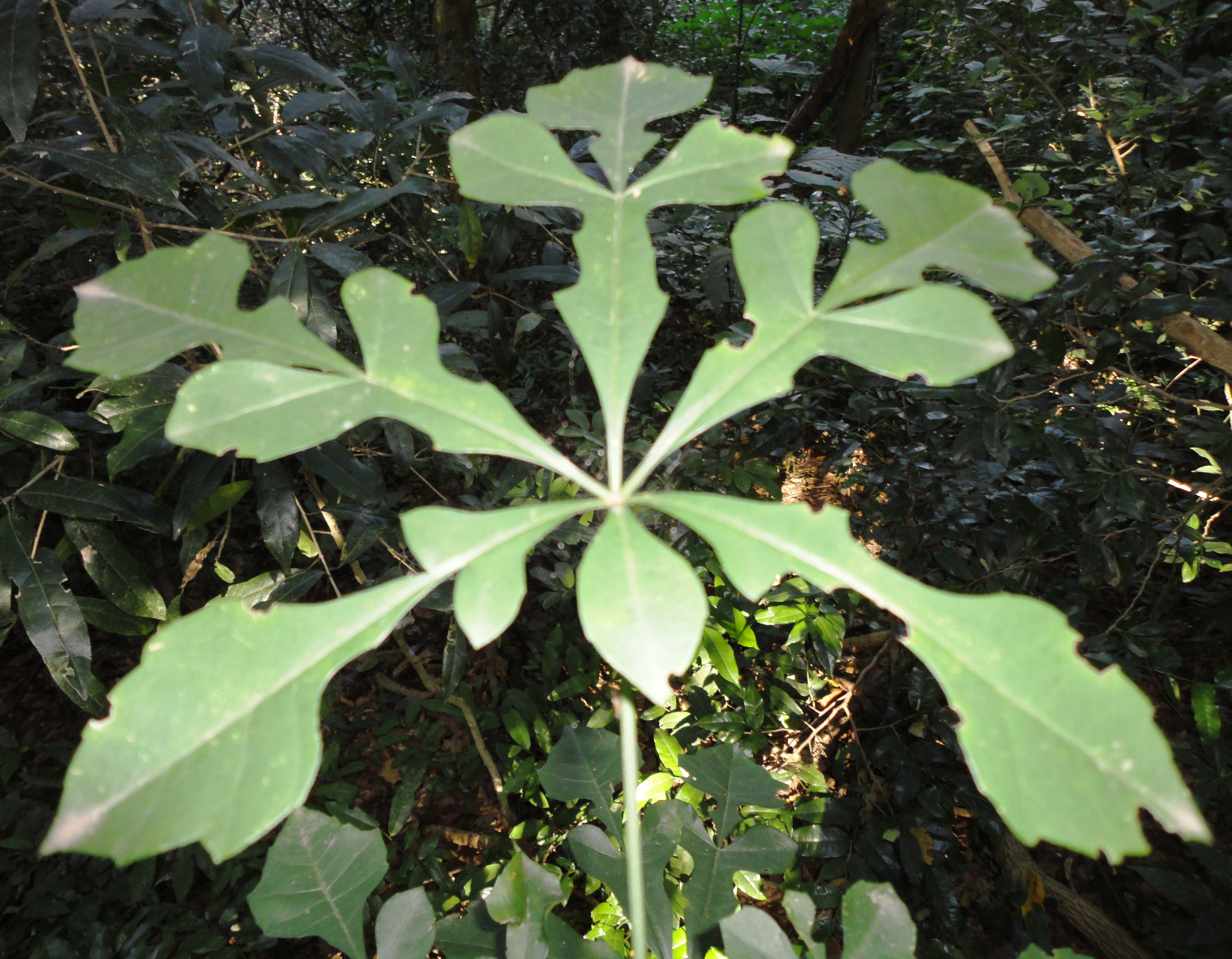
Compound leaf of Cussonia nicholsonii (6 leaflets)

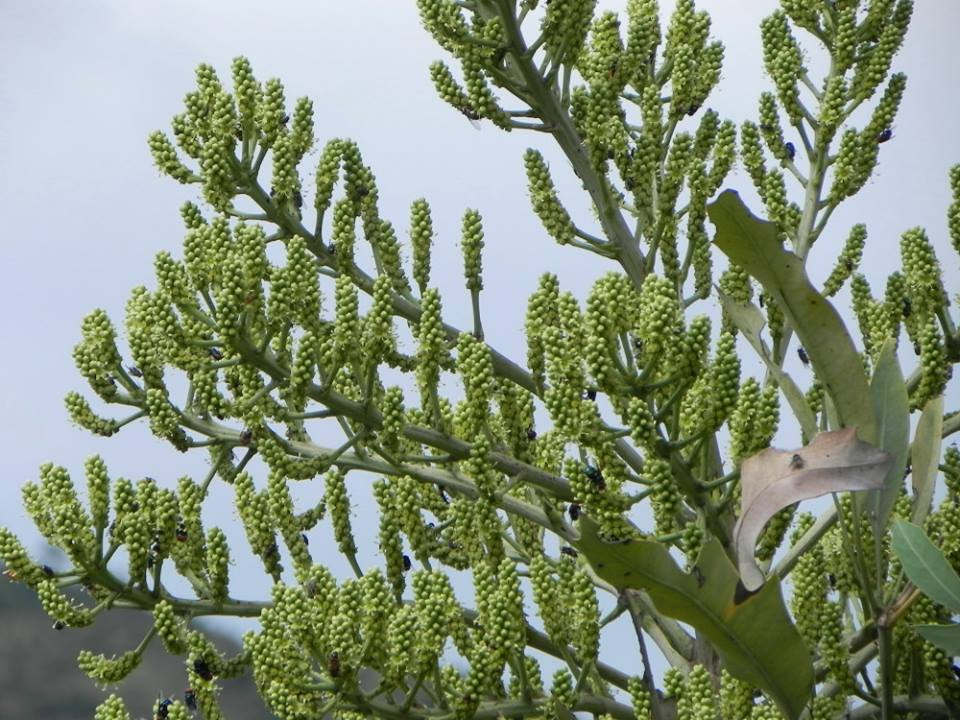
Inflorescences of Cussonia paniculata

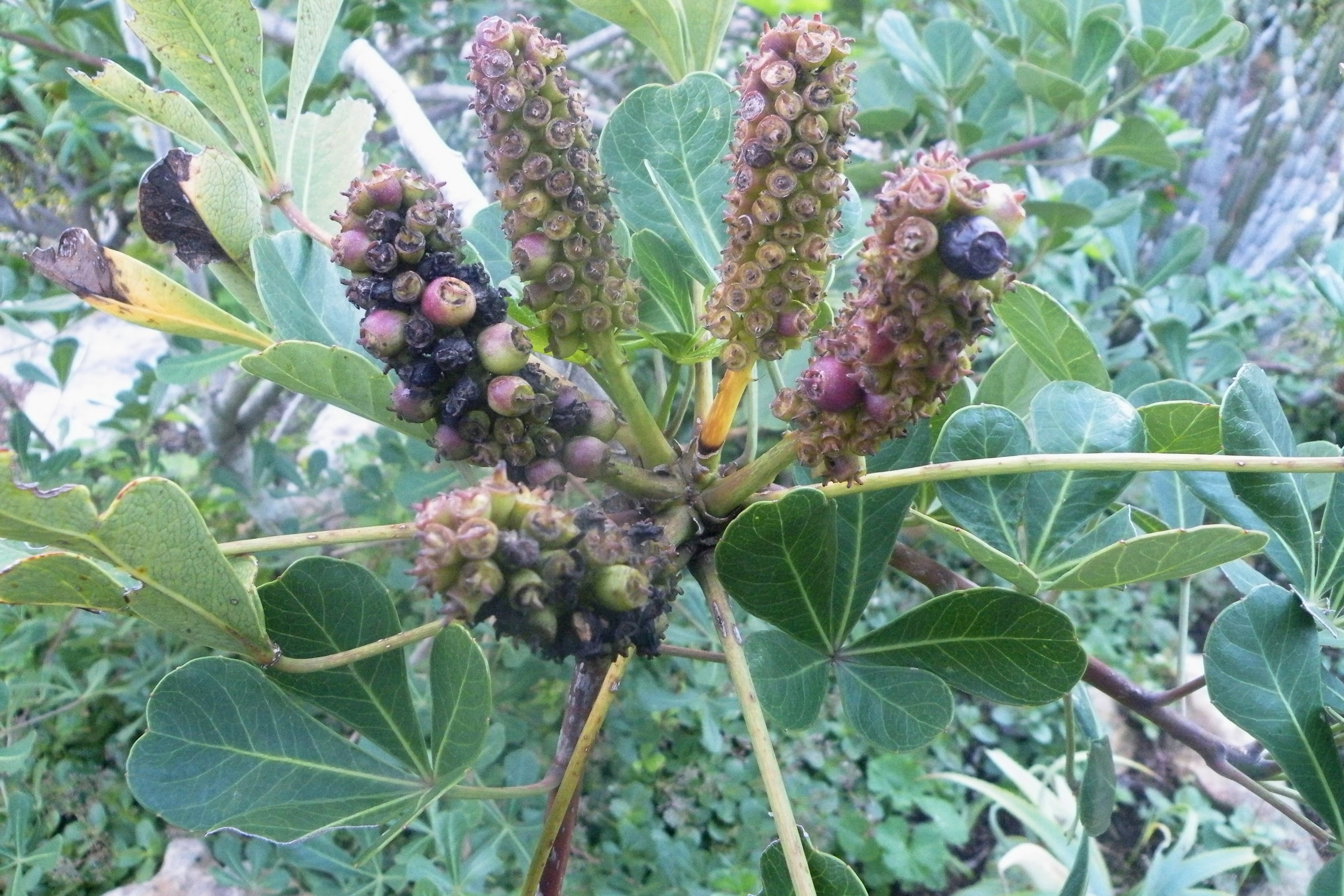
Infrutescences of Cussonia thyrsiflora
