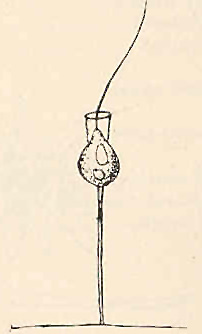
- Codonosiga botrytis

Scientific classification
- Domain: Eukaryota
- Clade: Obazoa
- Clade: Opisthokonta
- Class: Choanoflagellata
- Order: Craspedida
- Family: Codonosigidae

Genera
- Codonosiga; Proterospongia

= Codonosigidae =

Family of choanoflagellates

Codonosigidae were a choanoflagellate family. In the newest taxonomy the family Codonsigidae is replaced by the Salpingoecidae.
