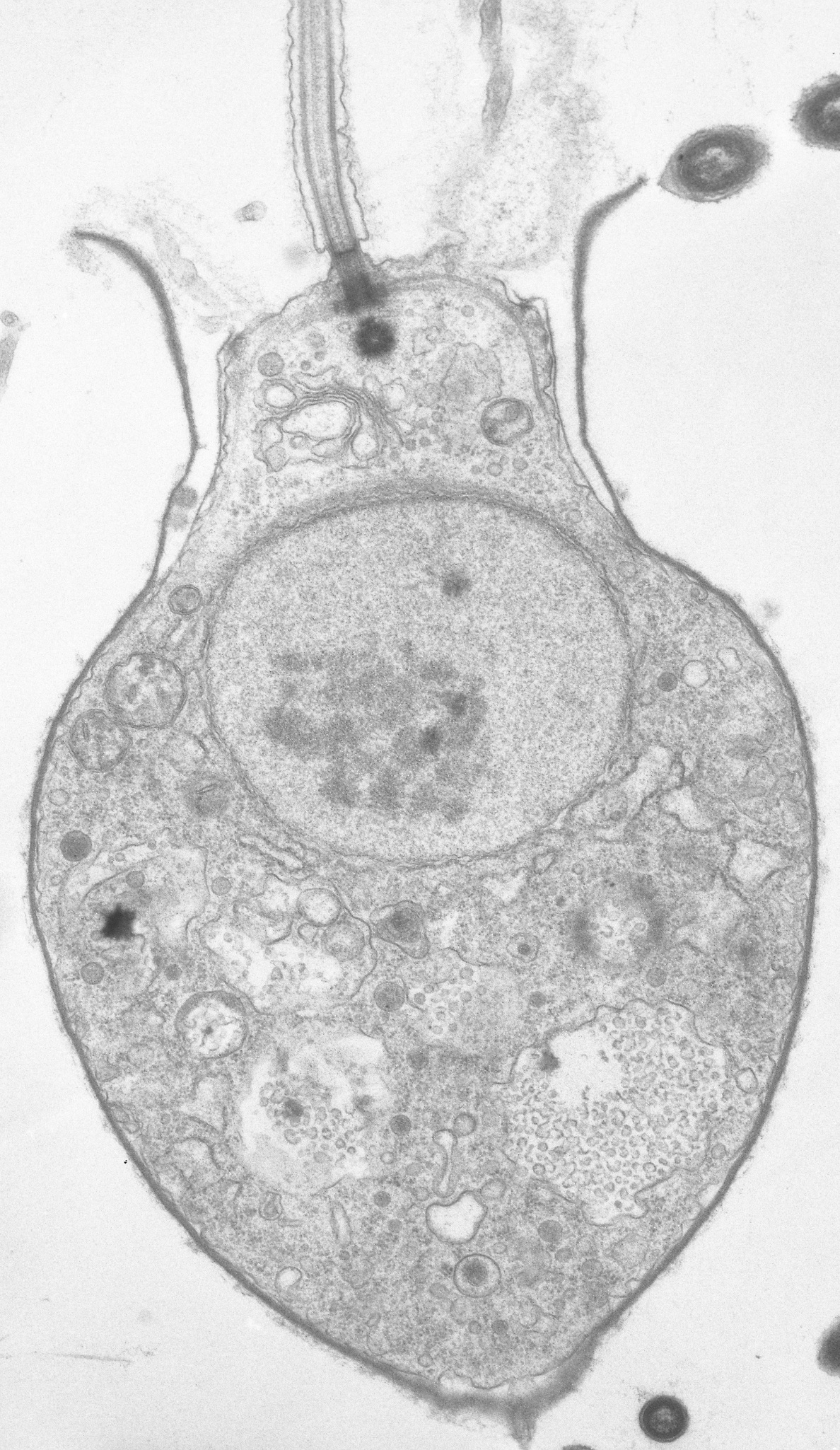
- Salpingoeca sp., in transmission electron microscopy (TEM)

Scientific classification
- Domain: Eukaryota
- Clade: Obazoa
- Clade: Opisthokonta
- Class: Choanoflagellata
- Order: Craspedida
- Family: Salpingoecidae; W.S.Kent, 1880

Genera
- Choanoeca; Diploeca; Pachysoeca; Salpingoeca; Sphaeroeca; Stelexomonas

= Salpingoecidae =

Family of choanoflagellates

Salpingoecidae is a family of choanoflagellates.
