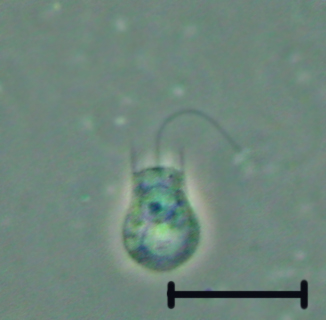
- Codosiga sp.

Scientific classification
- Domain: Eukaryota
- Clade: Podiata
- Supergroup: Amorphea
- Clade: Obazoa
- Clade: Opisthokonta
- Clade: Holozoa
- Clade: Filozoa
- Clade: Choanozoa
- Class: Choanoflagellata; Kent 1880–1882

Type species
- Monosiga brevicollis

Orders & families
- Craspedida; Codonosigidae; Salpingoecidae; Acanthoecida; Stephanoecidae; Acanthoecidae

Synonyms
- Craspedmonadina Stein 1878; Craspedomonadaceae Senn 1900; Craspedophyceae Chadefaud 1960; Craspédomonadophycidées Bourrelly 1968; Craspedomonadophyceae Hibberd 1976; Choanomonadea Krylov et al. 1980; Choanoflagellida Levine et al. 1980, Lee et al., 1985; Choanoflagellea Cavalier-Smith 1997; Choanomonada Adl et al. 2005; Choanoflagellatea Cavalier-Smith 1998

= Choanoflagellate =

Choanoflagellates Temporal range: Neoproterozoic-present, fossils from 950–0 Ma Only possible fossils are known from Cretaceous (Cenomanian/Turonian)

Group of eukaryotes considered the closest living relatives of animals

Choanoflagellates are a group of free-living unicellular and colonial flagellate eukaryotes considered to be the closest living relatives of animals. The name refers to the characteristic funnel-shaped "collar" of interconnected microvilli and the presence of a flagellum. Choanoflagellates are found globally in aquatic environments, and they are of particular interest to evolutionary biologists studying the origins of multicellularity in animals.

The flagellum of choanoflagellates is surrounded by microvilli at its base. Movement of the flagellum creates water currents that can propel free-swimming choanoflagellates through the water column and trap bacteria and detritus against the microvilli, where these foodstuffs are engulfed. This feeding plays an ecological role in the carbon cycle by linking different trophic levels.

Choanoflagellates bear morphological similarities to the choanocyte, a type of cell in sponges. As the closest living relatives of animals, choanoflagellates serve as a useful model for reconstructions of the last unicellular ancestor of animals. According to a 2021 study, crown group craspedids (and perhaps crown group choanoflagellates if Acanthoecida arose within Craspedida) appeared 422.78 million years ago, although a previous study from 2017 recovered the divergence of the crown group choanoflagellates (craspedids) at 786.62 million years.

== Etymology ==
Choanoflagellate is a hybrid word from Greek χοάνη khoánē meaning "funnel" (due to the shape of the collar) and the Latin word flagellum (whence English flagellum).

== Appearance ==
Detailed morphology

Each choanoflagellate has a single flagellum, surrounded by a ring of actin-filled protrusions called microvilli, forming a cylindrical or conical "collar" (choanos in Greek). Movement of the flagellum draws water through the collar, and bacteria and detritus are captured by the microvilli and ingested. Water currents generated by the flagellum also push free-swimming cells along, as in animal sperm. In contrast, most other flagellates are pulled by their flagella.

In addition to the single apical flagellum surrounded by actin-filled microvilli that characterizes choanoflagellates, the internal organization of organelles in the cytoplasm is constant. A flagellar basal body sits at the base of the apical flagellum, and a second, non-flagellar basal body rests at a right angle to the flagellar base. The nucleus occupies an apical-to-central position in the cell, and food vacuoles are positioned in the basal region of the cytoplasm. Additionally, the cell body of many choanoflagellates is surrounded by a distinguishing extracellular matrix or periplast. These cell coverings vary greatly in structure and composition and are used by taxonomists for classification purposes. Many choanoflagellates build complex basket-shaped "houses", called lorica, from several silica strips cemented together. The functional significance of the periplast is unknown, but in sessile organisms, it is thought to aid attachment to the substrate. In planktonic organisms, there is speculation that the periplast increases drag, thereby counteracting the force generated by the flagellum and increasing feeding efficiency.

Choanoflagellates are either free-swimming in the water column or sessile, adhering to the substrate directly or through either the periplast or a thin pedicel. Although choanoflagellates are thought to be strictly free-living and heterotrophic, several choanoflagellate relatives, such as members of Ichthyosporea or Mesomycetozoa, follow a parasitic or pathogenic lifestyle. The life histories of choanoflagellates are poorly understood. Many species are thought to be solitary; however, coloniality seems to have arisen independently several times within the group, and colonial species still retain a solitary stage.

== Ecology ==
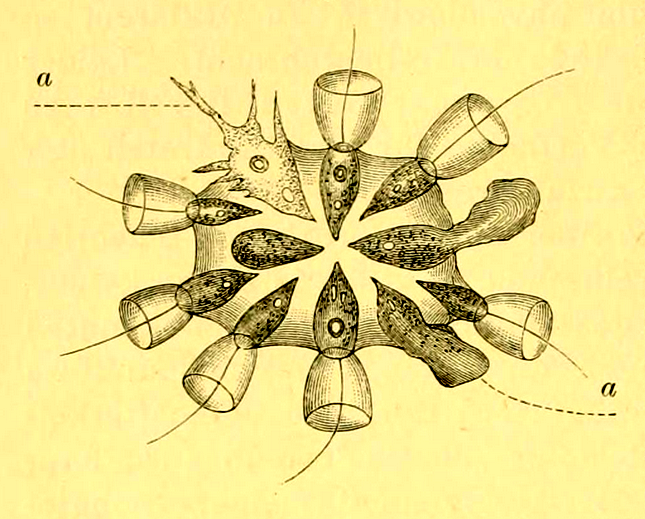
Drawing of a choanoflagellate colony by Metchnikoff, 1886

Over 125 extant species of choanoflagellates are known, distributed globally in marine, brackish and freshwater environments from the Arctic to the tropics, occupying both pelagic and benthic zones. Although most sampling of choanoflagellates has occurred between 0 and 25 m (0 and 82 ft), they have been recovered from as deep as 300 m (980 ft) in open water and 100 m (330 ft) under Antarctic ice sheets.

Many species are hypothesized to be cosmopolitan on a global scale [e.g., Diaphanoeca grandis has been reported from North America, Europe and Australia (OBIS)], while other species are reported to have restricted regional distributions. Co-distributed choanoflagellate species can occupy quite different microenvironments, but in general, the factors that influence the distribution and dispersion of choanoflagellates remain to be elucidated.

A number of species, such as those in the genus Proterospongia, form simple colonies, planktonic clumps that resemble a miniature cluster of grapes in which each cell in the colony is flagellated or clusters of cells on a single stalk. A colonial species from Mono Lake, Barroeca monosierra, forms spheres filled with a branched network of an extracellular matrix where a microbiome of different species of symbiotic bacteria live. In October 2019, scientists found a new band behaviour of choanoflagellates: they apparently can coordinate to respond to light. Studies on the colonial species Salpingoeca rosetta have shown that the individual cells use electrical signals to coordinate their movements and synchronize flagellar beating within the colony, using the same type of voltage-gated calcium channels as those found in animal neurons and muscles.

The choanoflagellates feed on bacteria and link otherwise inaccessible forms of carbon to organisms higher in the trophic chain. Even today, they are important in the carbon cycle and microbial food web. There is some evidence that choanoflagellates feast on viruses as well.

== Life cycle ==
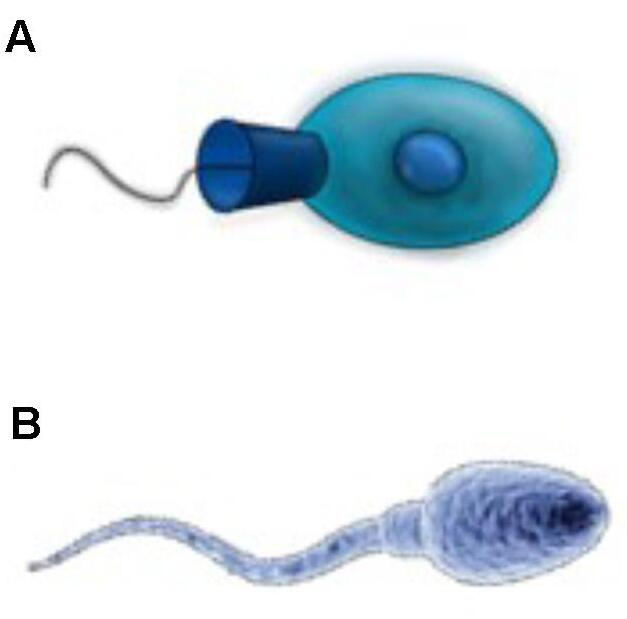
The calcium homeostasis of a modern sperm cell (B) looks very similar to that of an ancient choanoflagellate (A). The hormone precursor farnesol is very ancient in evolution, and its use goes back at least as far as the choanoflagellates which preceded the animals.

Choanoflagellates grow vegetatively, with multiple species undergoing longitudinal fission; however, the reproductive life cycle of choanoflagellates remains to be elucidated. A paper released in August 2017 showed that environmental changes, including the presence of certain bacteria, trigger the swarming and subsequent sexual reproduction of choanoflagellates. The ploidy level is unknown; however, the discovery of both retrotransposons and key genes involved in meiosis previously suggested that they used sexual reproduction as part of their life cycle. Some choanoflagellates can undergo encystment, which involves the retraction of the flagellum and collar and encasement in an electron dense fibrillar wall. On transfer to fresh media, excystment occurs; though it remains to be directly observed.

Evidence for sexual reproduction has been reported in the choanoflagellate species Salpingoeca rosetta. Evidence has also been reported for the presence of conserved meiotic genes in the choanoflagellates Monosiga brevicollis and Monosiga ovata.

== Silicon biomineralization ==
The Acanthoecid choanoflagellates produce an extracellular basket structure known as a lorica. The lorica is composed of individual costal strips, made of a silica-protein biocomposite. Each costal strip is formed within the choanoflagellate cell and is then secreted to the cell surface. In nudiform choanoflagellates, lorica assembly takes place using a number of tentacles once sufficient costal strips have been produced to comprise a full lorica. In tectiform choanoflagellates, costal strips are accumulated in a set arrangement below the collar. During cell division, the new cell takes these costal strips as part of cytokinesis and assembles its own lorica using only these previously produced strips.

Choanoflagellate biosilicification requires the concentration of silicic acid within the cell. This is carried out by silicon transporter (SiT) proteins. Analysis of choanoflagellate SiTs shows that they are similar to the SiT-type silicon transporters of diatoms and other silica-forming stramenopiles. The SiT gene family shows little or no homology to any other genes, even to genes in non-siliceous choanoflagellates or stramenopiles. This suggests that the SiT gene family evolved via a lateral gene transfer event between Acanthoecids and Stramenopiles. This is a remarkable case of horizontal gene transfer between two distantly related eukaryotic groups, and has provided clues to the biochemistry and silicon-protein interactions of the unique SiT gene family.

== Classification ==
=== Relationship to metazoans ===
Félix Dujardin, a French biologist interested in protozoan evolution, recorded the morphological similarities of choanoflagellates and sponge choanocytes and proposed the possibility of a close relationship as early as 1841. Over the 1990s and the 2000s, this hypothesized relationship between choanoflagellates and animals has been upheld by independent analyses of multiple unlinked genetic sequences: 18S rDNA, nuclear protein-coding genes, and mitochondrial genomes (Steenkamp, et al., 2006; Burger, et al., 2003; Wainright, et al., 1993). Importantly, comparisons of mitochondrial genome sequences from a choanoflagellate and three sponges confirm the placement of choanoflagellates as an outgroup to Metazoa (animals, also known as Animalia) and negate the possibility that choanoflagellates evolved from metazoans (Lavrov, et al., 2005). Finally, a 2001 study of genes expressed in choanoflagellates has revealed that choanoflagellates synthesize homologues of metazoan cell signaling and adhesion genes. Genome sequencing shows that, among living organisms, the choanoflagellates are most closely related to animals.

Because choanoflagellates and metazoans are closely related, comparisons between the two groups promise to provide insights into the biology of their last common ancestor and the earliest events in metazoan evolution. The choanocytes (also known as "collared cells") of sponges (considered among the most basal metazoa) have the same basic structure as choanoflagellates. Collared cells are found in other animal groups, such as ribbon worms, suggesting this was the morphology of their last common ancestor. The last common ancestor of animals and choanoflagellates was unicellular, perhaps forming simple colonies; in contrast, the last common ancestor of all eumetazoan animals was a multicellular organism, with differentiated tissues, a definite "body plan", and embryonic development (including gastrulation). The timing of the splitting of these lineages is difficult to constrain, but was probably in the late Precambrian, >600 million years ago.

External relationships of Choanoflagellatea.

- Opisthokonta
  - Holomycota
    - Cristidiscoidea
    - Fungi
  - Holozoa
    - Ichthyosporea
    - - Corallochytrea
      - Filozoa
        - Filasterea
        - Choanozoa
          - Animalia (Metazoa)
          - Choanoflagellatea

=== Phylogenetic relationships ===
The choanoflagellates were included in Chrysophyceae until Hibberd, 1975. Recent molecular phylogenetic reconstruction of the internal relationships of choanoflagellates allows the polarization of character evolution within the clade. Large fragments of the nuclear SSU and LSU ribosomal RNA, alpha tubulin, and heat-shock protein 90 coding genes were used to resolve the internal relationships and character polarity within choanoflagellates. Each of the four genes showed similar results independently and analysis of the combined data set (concatenated) along with sequences from other closely related species (animals and fungi) demonstrate that choanoflagellates are strongly supported as monophyletic and confirm their position as the closest known unicellular living relative of animals.

Previously, Choanoflagellida was divided into these three families based on the composition and structure of their periplast: Codonosigidae, Salpingoecidae and Acanthoecidae. Members of the family Codonosigidae appear to lack a periplast when examined by light microscopy, but may have a fine outer coat visible only by electron microscopy. The family Salpingoecidae consists of species whose cells are encased in a firm theca that is visible by both light and electron microscopy. The theca is a secreted covering predominately composed of cellulose or other polysaccharides. These divisions are now known to be paraphyletic, with convergent evolution of these forms widespread. The third family of choanoflagellates, the Acanthoecidae, has been supported as a monophyletic group. This clade possess a synapomorphy of the cells being found within a basket-like lorica, providing the alternative name of "Loricate Choanoflagellates". The Acanthoecid lorica is composed of a series of siliceous costal strips arranged into a species-specific lorica pattern."

The choanoflagellate tree based on molecular phylogenetics divides into three well supported clades. Clade 1 and Clade 2 each consist of a combination of species traditionally attributed to the Codonosigidae and Salpingoecidae, while Clade 3 comprises species from the group taxonomically classified as Acanthoecidae. The mapping of character traits on to this phylogeny indicates that the last common ancestor of choanoflagellates was a marine organism with a differentiated life cycle with sedentary and motile stages.

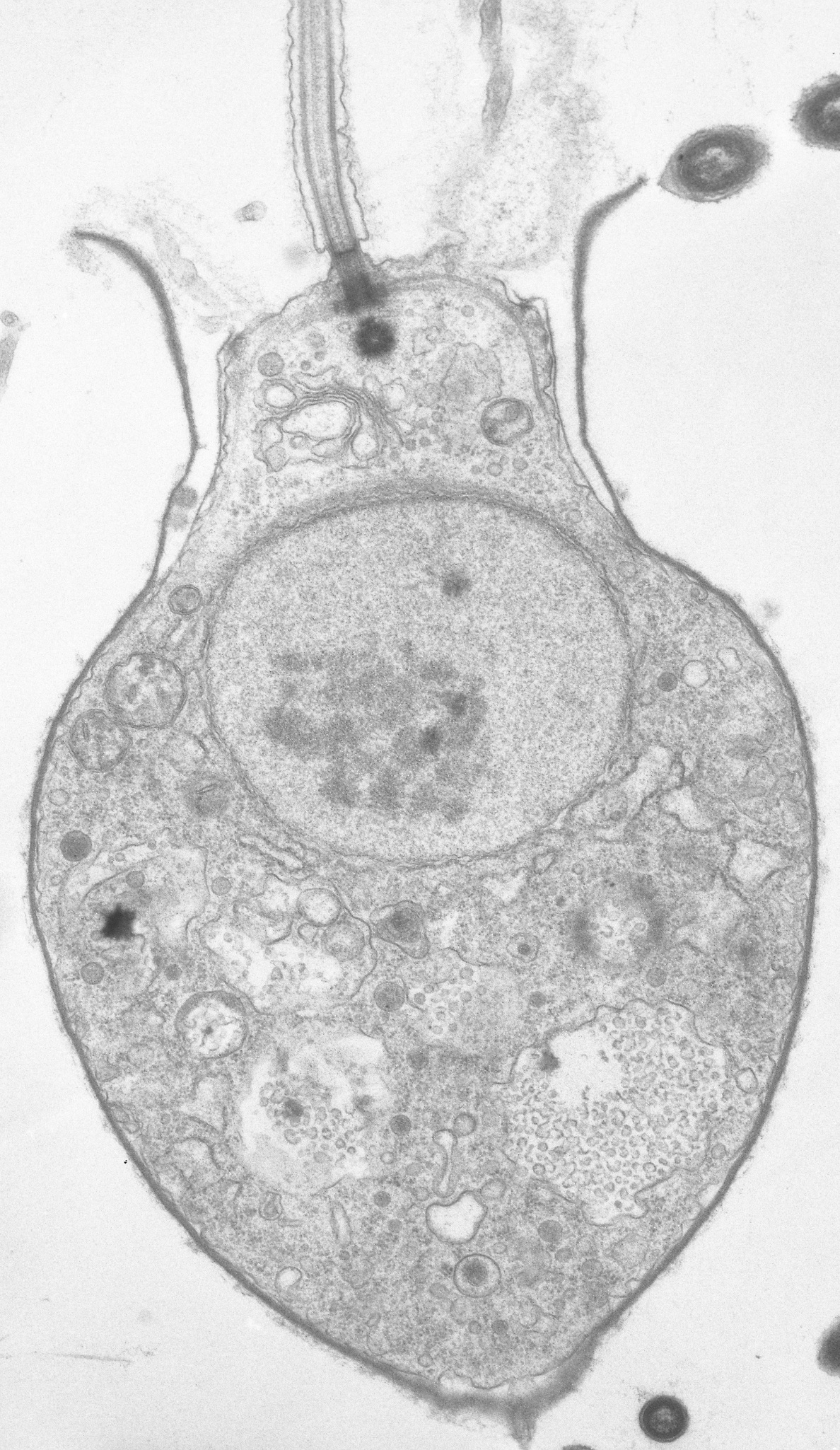
Salpingoeca sp. section under TEM

=== Taxonomy ===
Choanoflagellates;

- Order Craspedida Cavalier-Smith 1997 em. Nitsche et al. 2011
  - Family Salpingoecidae Kent 1880-1882
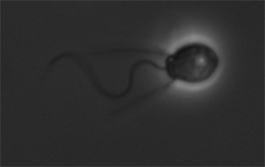
    - Salpingoeca rosetta under PCM
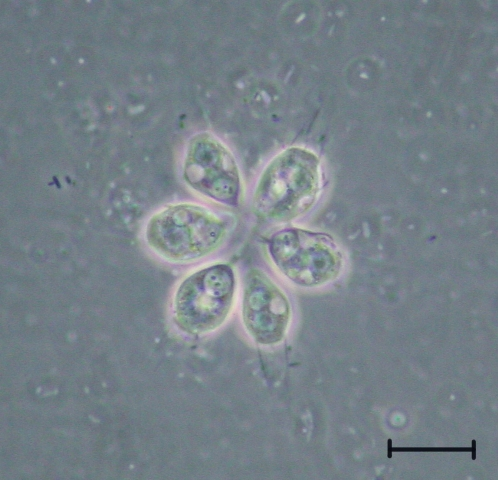
      Codosiga sp. under light microscopy, isolated from Siberian buried soils.
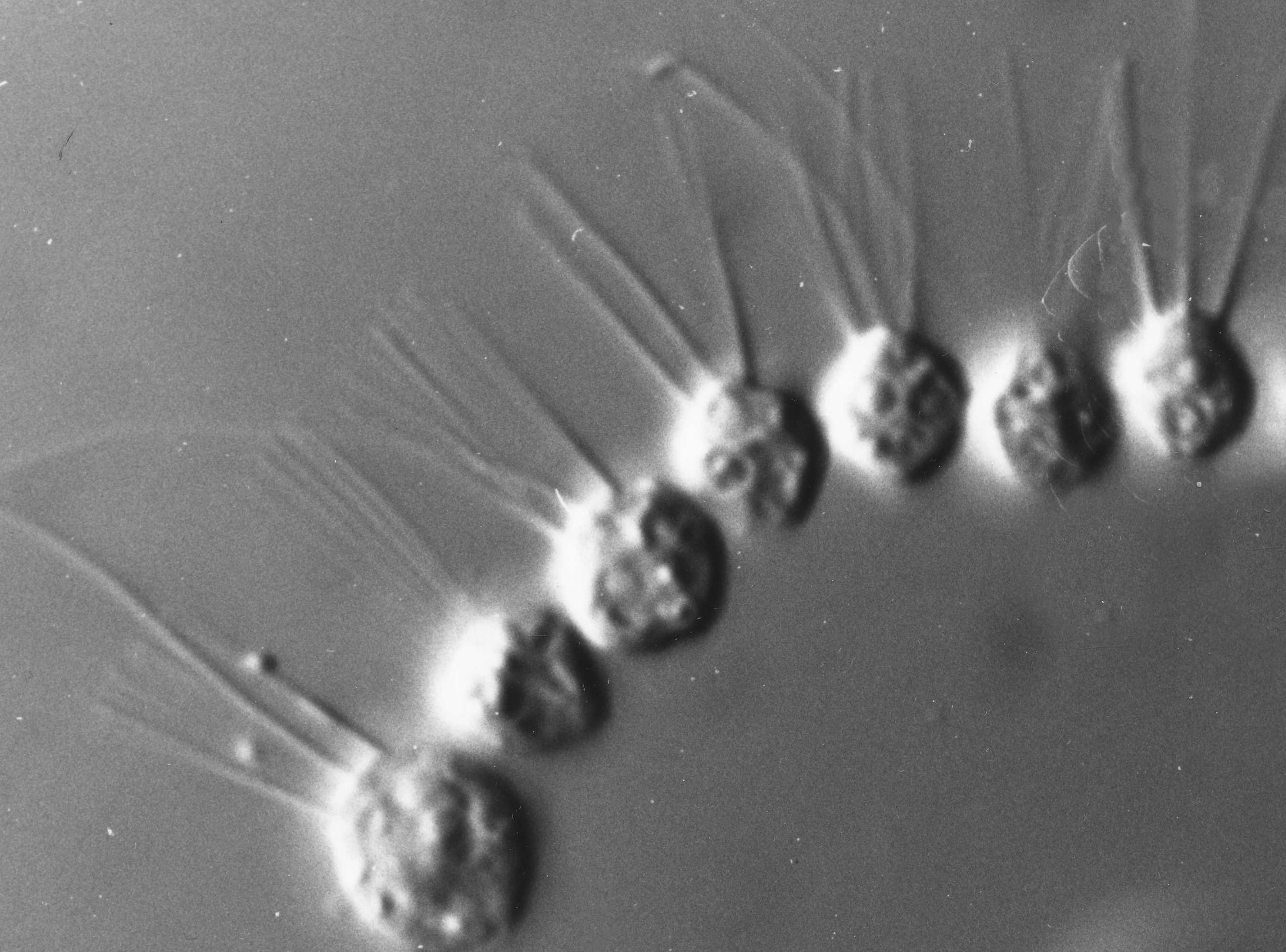
      Desmarella moniliformis colony under PCM
      ?Dicraspedella Ellis 1930
    - ?Diploeca Ellis 1930
    - ?Diplosigopsis Francé 1897
    - ?Pachysoeca Ellis 1930
    - ?Piropsis Meunier 1910
    - ?Salpingorhiza Klug 1936
    - ?Sphaerodendron Zhukov, Mylnikov & Moiseev 1976 non Seemann 1865
    - ?Stelexomonas Lackey 1942
    - Astrosiga Kent 1880-1882
    - Aulomonas Lackey 1942
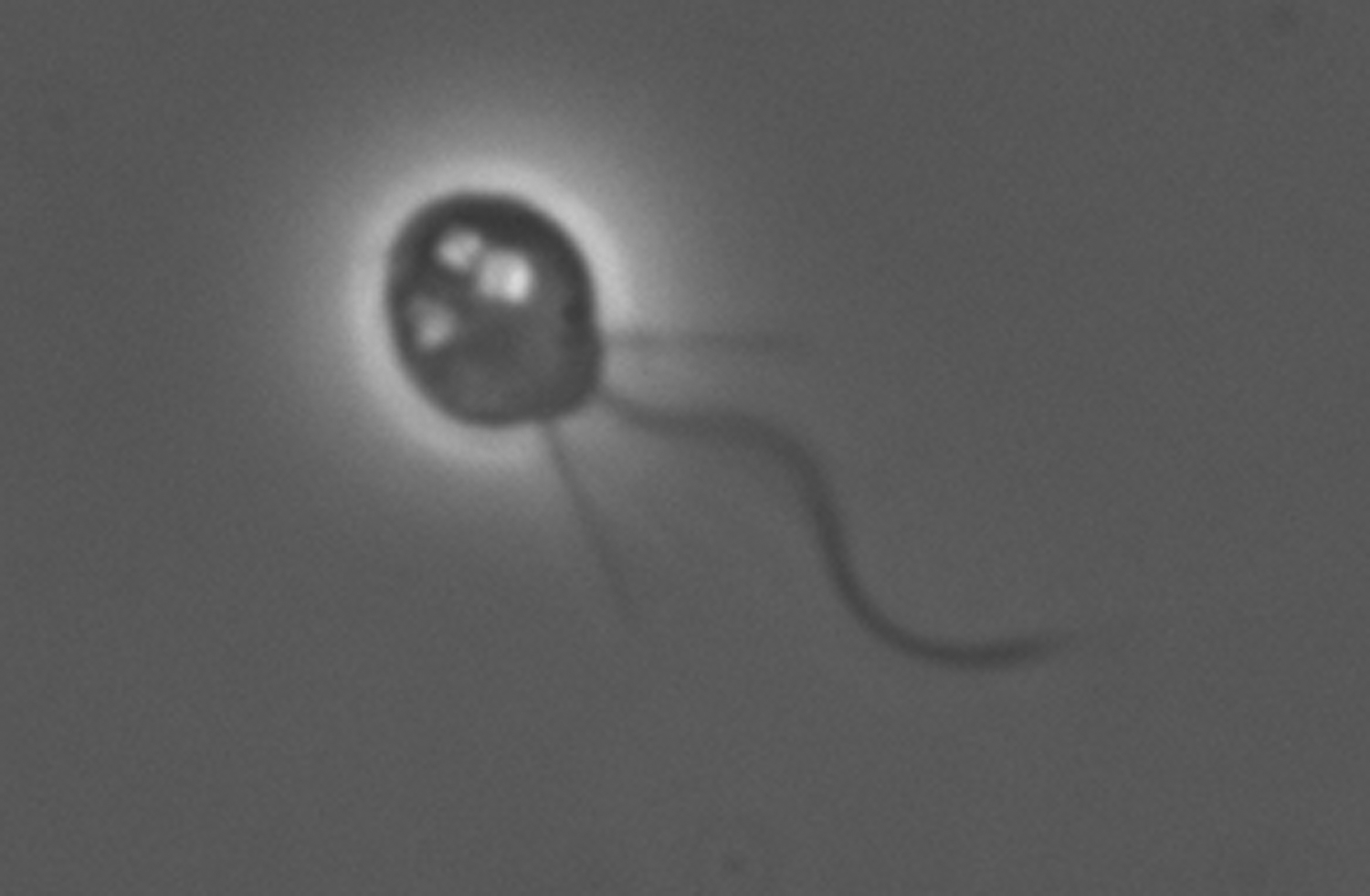
    - Monosiga brevicollis under PCM
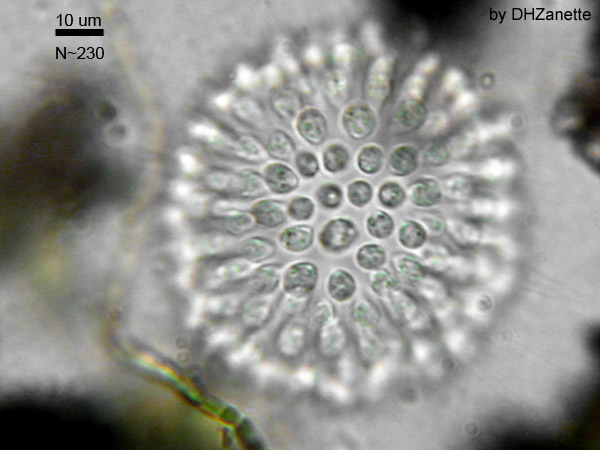
      Sphaeroeca colony (approx. 230 individuals) under light microscopy.
      Choanoeca Ellis 1930
    - Cladospongia Iyengar & Ramathan 1940
    - Codonosigopsis Senn 1900
    - Diplosiga Frenzel 1891
    - Hartaetosiga Carr, Richter & Nitsche 2017
    - Mylnosiga Carr, Richter & Nitsche 2017
    - Lagenoeca Kent 1881
    - Microstomoeca Carr, Richter & Nitsche 2017
    - Paramonosiga Jeuck, Arndt & Nitsche 2014
    - Salpingoeca James-Clark 1868 non Ellis 1933
    - Stagondoeca Carr, Richter & Nitsche 2017
  - Family Codonosigaceae Kent 1880-1882
    - Codosiga James-Clark 1866
    - Desmarella Kent 1880-1882
    - Kentrosiga Schiller 1953
    - Monosiga Kent 1880-1882
    - Proterospongia Kent 1882
    - Sphaeroeca Lauterborn 1894 non Meyrick 1895
    - Stylochromonas Lackey 1940
- Order Acanthoecida Norris 1965 em. Nitsche et al. 2011 (Loricate choanoflagellates)
  - Conioeca Thomsen & Ostergaard 2019
  - Family Acanthoecidae Norris 1965 em. Nitsche et al. 2011 (Nudiform choanoflagellates)
    - Acanthoeca Ellis 1930
    - Enibas Schiwitza, Arndt & Nitsche 2019
    - Helgoeca Leadbeater 2008
    - Polyoeca Kent 1880
    - Savillea Loeblich III 1967
  - Family Stephanoecidae Leadbeater 2011 (Tectiform choanoflagellates)
    - ?Conion Thomsen 1982
    - ?Spiraloecion Marchant & Perrin 1986
    - Acanthocorbis Hara & Takahashi 1984
    - Amoenoscopa Hara & Takahashi 1987
    - Apheloecion Thomsen 1983
    - Bicosta Leadbeater 1978
    - Calliacantha Leadbeater 1978
    - Calotheca Thomsen & Moestrup 1983 non Desv. 1810 non Spreng. 1817 non Heyden 1887
    - Cosmoeca Thomsen 1984
    - Crinolina Thomsen 1976 non Smetana 1982
    - Crucispina Espeland & Throndsen 1986
    - Diaphanoeca Ellis 1930
    - Didymoeca Doweld 2003
    - Kakoeca Buck & Marchant 1991
    - Monocosta Thomsen 1979 non Monocostus Schumann 1904
    - Nannoeca Thomsen 1988
    - Parvicorbicula Deflandre 1960
    - Pleurasiga Schiller 1925
    - Polyfibula Manton 1981
    - Saepicula Leadbeater 1980
    - Saroeca Thomsen 1979
    - Spinoeca Thomsen, Ostergaard & Hansen 1995 non Poulsen 1973
    - Stephanacantha Thomsen 1983
    - Stephanoeca Ellis 1930
    - Syndetophyllum Thomsen & Moestrup 1983
    - Thomsenella Özdikmen 2009

== Genomes and transcriptomes ==
=== Monosiga brevicollis genome ===
The genome of Monosiga brevicollis, with 41.6 million base pairs, is similar in size to filamentous fungi and other free-living unicellular eukaryotes, but far smaller than that of typical animals. In 2010, a phylogenomic study revealed that several algal genes are present in the genome of Monosiga brevicollis. This could be due to the fact that, in early evolutionary history, choanoflagellates consumed algae as food through phagocytosis. Carr et al. (2010) screened the M. brevicollis genome for known eukaryotic meiosis genes. Of 19 known eukaryotic meiotic genes tested (including 8 that function in no other process than meiosis), 18 were identified in M. brevicollis. The presence of meiotic genes, including meiosis specific genes, indicates that meiosis, and by implication, sex is present within the choanoflagellates.

=== Salpingoeca rosetta genome ===
The genome of Salpingoeca rosetta is 55 megabases in size. Homologs of cell adhesion, neuropeptide and glycosphingolipid metabolism genes are present in the genome. S. rosetta has a sexual life cycle and transitions between haploid and diploid stages. In response to nutrient limitation, haploid cultures of S. rosetta become diploid. This ploidy shift coincides with mating during which small, flagellated cells fuse with larger flagellated cells. There is also evidence of historical mating and recombination in S. rosetta.

S. rosetta is induced to undergo sexual reproduction by the marine bacterium Vibrio fischeri. A single V. fischeri protein, EroS fully recapitulates the aphrodisiac-like activity of live V. fisheri.

=== Other genomes ===
The single-cell amplified genomes of four uncultured marine choanoflagellates, tentatively called UC1–UC4, were sequenced in 2019. The genomes of UC1 and UC4 are relatively complete.

=== Transcriptomes ===
An EST dataset from Monosiga ovata was published in 2006. The major finding of this transcriptome was the choanoflagellate Hoglet domain and shed light on the role of domain shuffling in the evolution of the Hedgehog signaling pathway. M. ovata has at least four eukaryotic meiotic genes.

The transcriptome of Stephanoeca diplocostata was published in 2013. This first transcriptome of a loricate choanoflagellate led to the discovery of choanoflagellate silicon transporters. Subsequently, similar genes were identified in a second loricate species, Diaphanoeca grandis. Analysis of these genes found that the choanoflagellate silicon transporters show homology to the SIT-type silicon transporters of diatoms and have evolved through horizontal gene transfer.

An additional 19 transcriptomes were published in 2018. A large number of gene families previously thought to be animal-only were found.
