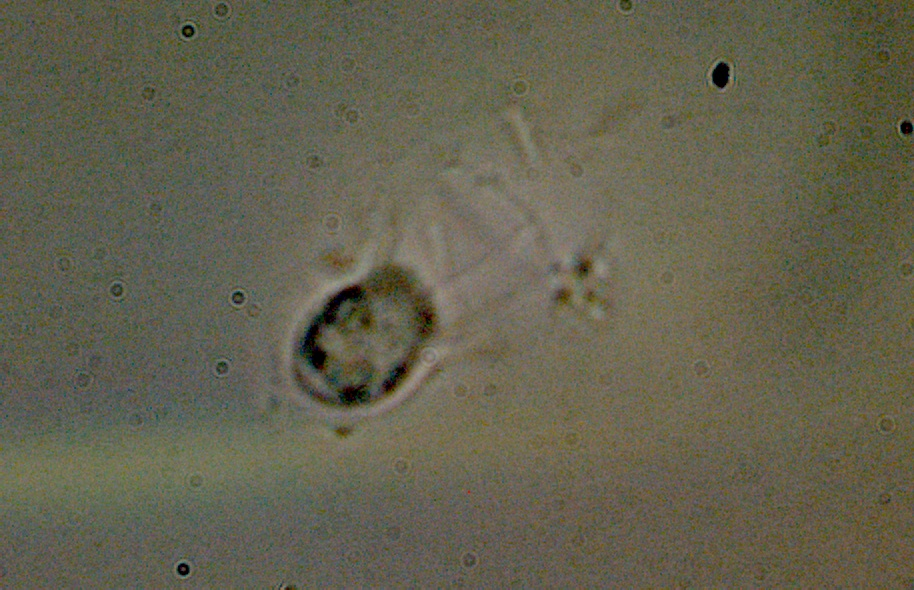
- Stephanoeca diplocostata taken under bright field at x100

Scientific classification
- Domain: Eukaryota
- Clade: Amorphea
- Class: Choanoflagellata
- Order: Acanthoecida
- Family: Acanthoecidae; Norris, 1965

Genera
- See text

= Acanthoecidae =

Family of protists

Acanthoecidae is a family of choanoflagellates. Its subgroups Diaphanoeca and Stephanoeca bear lorica composed of silica which possibly originate from diatoms via horizontal gene transfer.

== Genera ==
Acanthocorbis - Acanthoeca - Amoenoscopa - Apheloecion - Bicosta - Calliacantha - Calotheca - Campyloacantha - Conion - Cosmoeca - Crinolina - Crucispina - Diaphanoeca - Diplotheca - Kakoeca - Monocosta - Nannoeca - Parvicorbicula - Platypleura - Pleurasiga - Polyfibula - Polyoeca - Saepicula - Saroeca - Savillea - Spiraloecion - Stephanacantha - Stephanoeca - Syndetophyllum
