= Henry James Clark =

American naturalist (1826–1873)

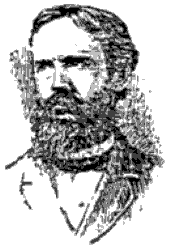
- Born: July 22, 1826; Easton, Massachusetts
- Died: July 1, 1873 (aged 46); Amherst, Massachusetts
- Education: New York University; Lawrence Scientific School
- Occupation: Naturalist

Henry James Clark (July 22, 1826 – July 1, 1873) was an American naturalist.

== Biography ==
He was born in Easton, Massachusetts, July 22, 1826. He graduated at New York University 1848; became a pupil of Asa Gray at the Cambridge botanical garden; graduated at the Lawrence Scientific School at Harvard 1854; assistant to Louis Agassiz till 1863, and also for three years adjunct Professor of Zoology at the Lawrence Scientific School; Professor of Natural Sciences in Pennsylvania State College, near Bellefonte, 1866–69; Professor of Natural History in University of Kentucky, Lexington, 1869–72; Professor of Veterinary Science in Massachusetts Agricultural College, Amherst, from 1872 until his death there July 1, 1873. He contributed to the Smithsonian publications, to the Proceedings of the American Academy of Arts and Sciences, and to other learned periodicals. Author of Mind in Nature (Cambridge, 1863) and of the Mode of Development of Animals (New York, 1865). See A. S. Packard, Jr.'s Memoir in Biographical Memoirs of the National Academy of Sciences (Washington, 1877).

In later life, he used the double-barrelled surname James-Clark.
