= William Saville-Kent =

English marine biologist and author (1845–1908)

William Saville-Kent FZS FLS
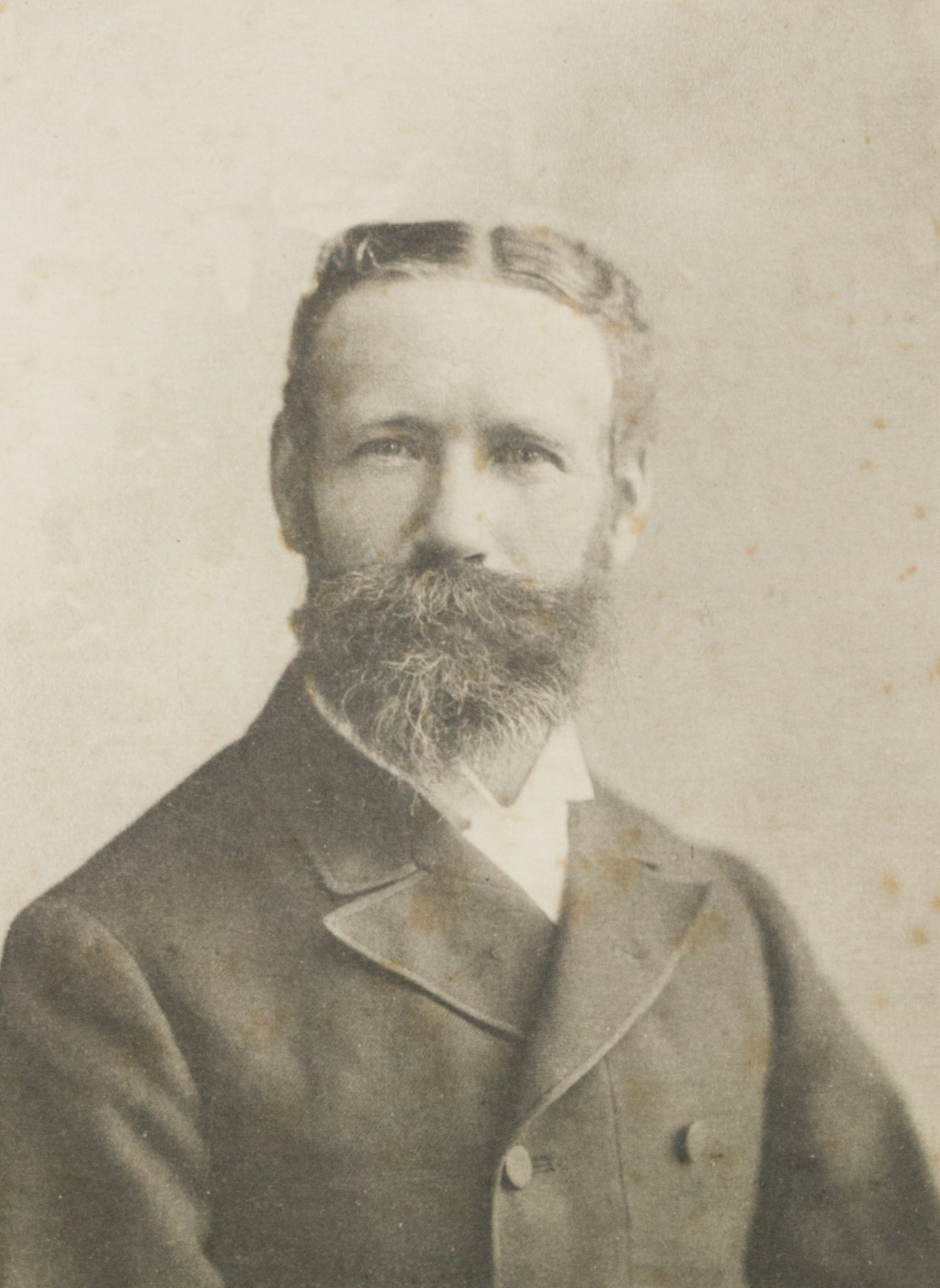
- Saville-Kent, c. 1892
- Born: 10 July 1845; Sidmouth, Devon, England
- Died: 11 October 1908 (aged 63); Bournemouth, Dorset
- Education: King's College London; Royal School of Mines
- Known for: Study of coral reefs, oysters
- Scientific career
- Fields: Marine biology
- Workplaces: Royal Society of Queensland
- Doctoral advisor: Thomas Henry Huxley

Signature
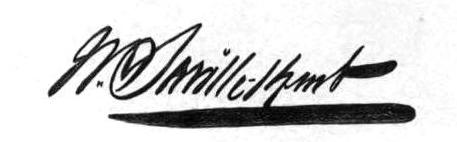

William Saville-Kent (10 July 1845 – 11 October 1908) was an English marine biologist, naturalist, Commissioner and Inspector of Tasmanian Fisheries and author. He is perhaps best-known for his work in the development of the artificial pearl industry.

== Early life ==
Born in the town of Sidmouth in Devon, South West England on 10 July 1845, William Saville-Kent was the son of Samuel Saville Kent (7 July 1800 – 5 February 1872) and Mary Ann Windus (b. 1808 – May 1852), who was Samuel's first wife. William was the youngest of ten children from his father's first marriage. Samuel was employed as a "Factory Commissioner" for the Home Office, and inspected factories to ensure that they were properly implementing the worker safety measures regulated in the Factory Acts of 1833. As the acts sought to alleviate the harm done to children that were caused by unregulated working conditions in the factories, Samuel's "duties required him to inspect factories that employed women and children." Despite having "ambitions for promotion," Samuel "suffered from the effects of local gossip and disapproval," as a consequence of him being a "known adulterer." Samuel's salacious reputation caused the family to move fairly often.

Saville-Kent's childhood was marred by several unfortunate events. First was the death of his mother, Mary Ann Windus, who died suddenly in May 1852. This was followed a few years later by the murder of his half-brother, Francis Saville-Kent, which led to national media coverage and great family upheaval; then, came the subsequent conviction of his elder sister, Constance, as a result of her confessing to the murder five years later. The Scotland Yard detective Inspector Jack Whicher—who was responsible for the murder investigation of Saville-Kent's half-brother—had also suspected that William was an accomplice, as Constance and William shared a close sibling relationship. Constance had initially been detained and questioned, but was released as a result of her high social status. However, no charges were ever made against William. Constance was sentenced to life in prison, which at the time was twenty years.

== Education ==
Saville-Kent was educated at King's College London, and then at the Royal School of Mines under T. H. Huxley. He held various jobs in Britain, including at the British Museum from 1866 to 1872. In 1869, he became a member of the Zoological Society of London and in 1873 of the Linnean Society. In 1870, Saville-Kent received a grant from the Royal Society to conduct a dredging survey off Portugal. He worked at the Brighton Aquarium (1872–1873), then at the Manchester Aquarium (1873–1876). He went on to work for various other aquariums, before returning to Brighton in 1879.

Saville-Kent married in 1872, but his wife died three years later. He remarried in 1876.

== Australia ==
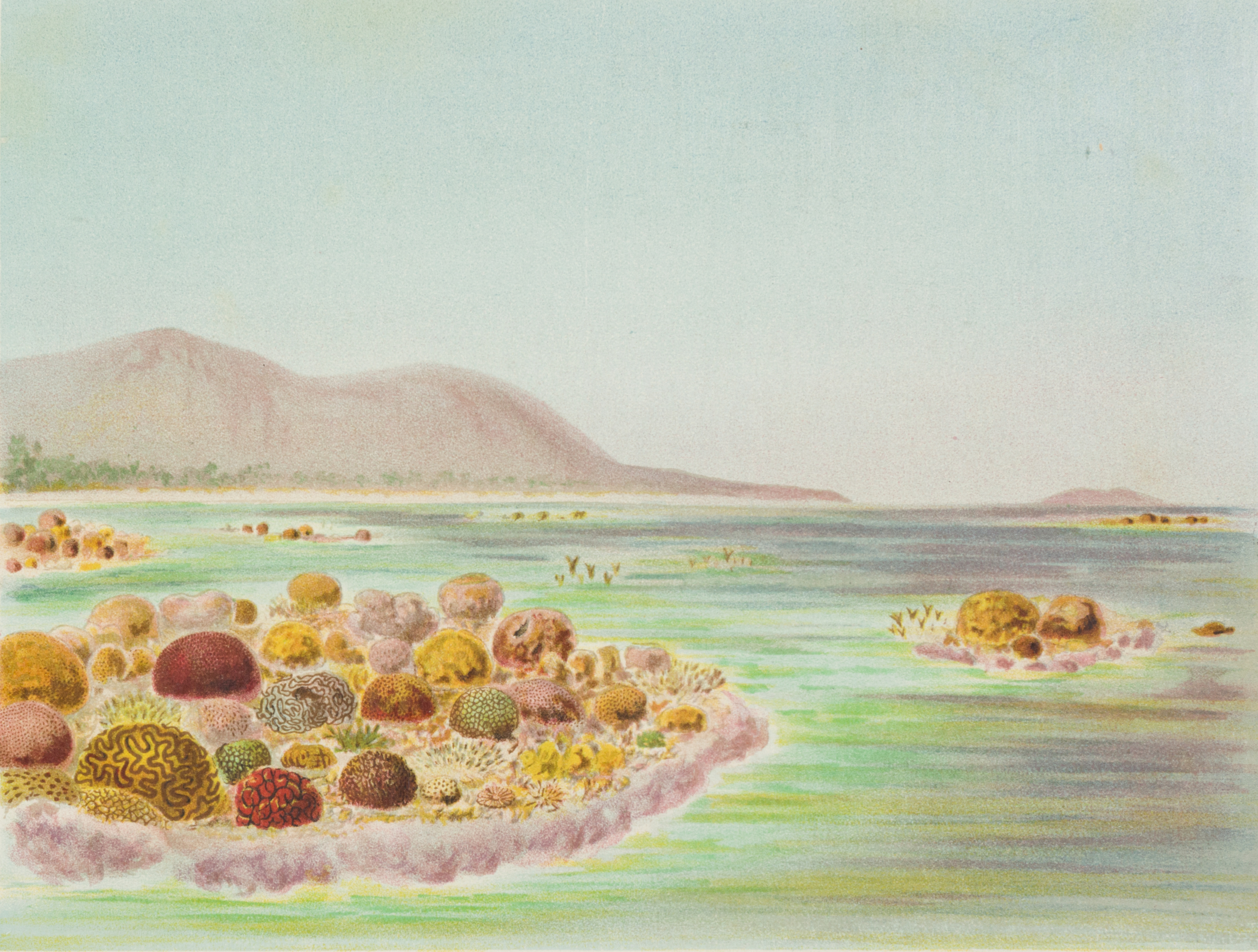
Tidally exposed inshore reef, Palm Islands Queensland, 1897, from a drawing by Saville-Kent

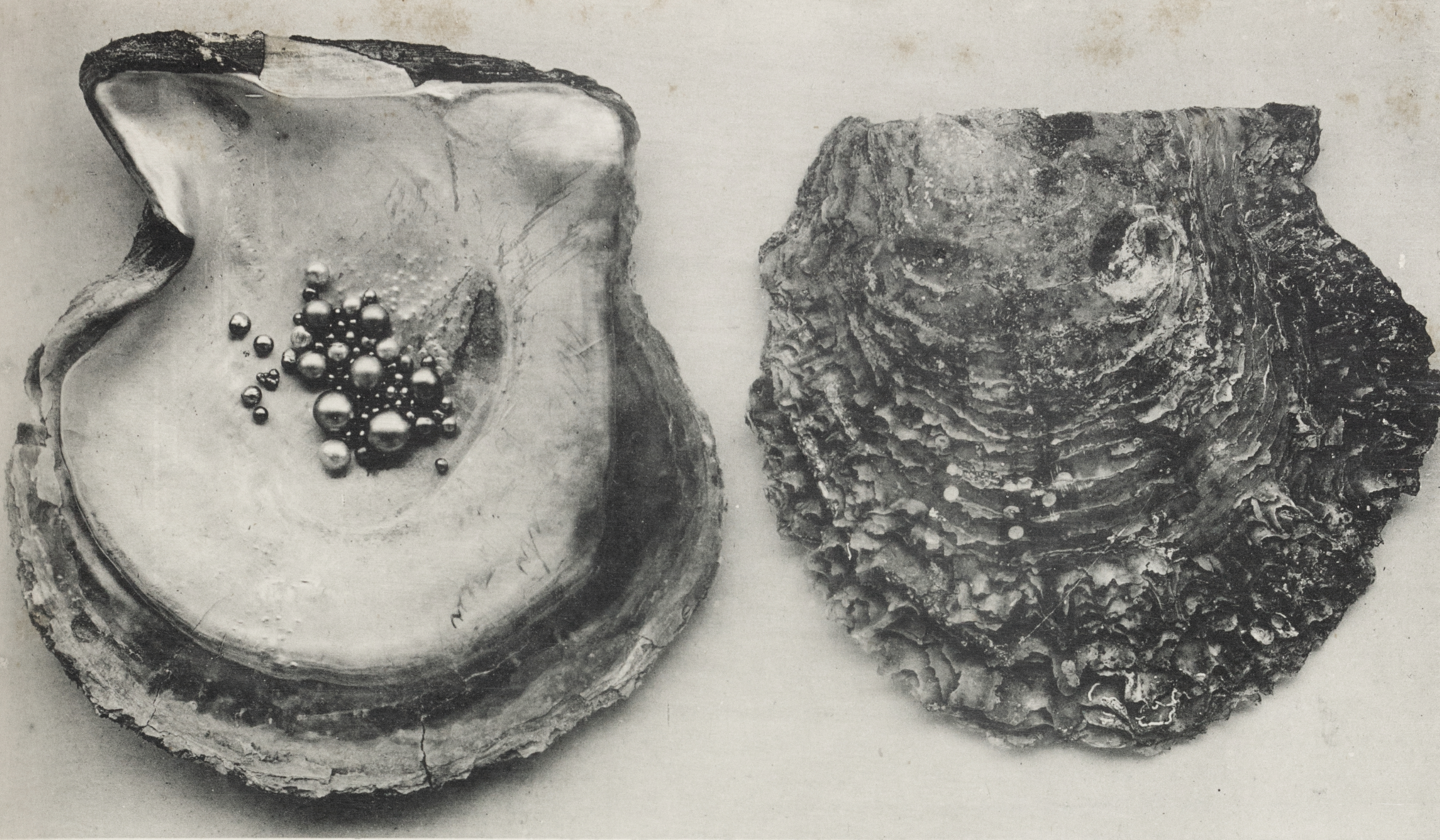
Artificially produced golden pearls, Shark's Bay, Western Australia, 1897, photo by Saville-Kent

On the recommendation of Huxley, in 1884 Saville-Kent became Inspector of Fisheries in Tasmania. In 1889, he became Commissioner of Fisheries for Queensland, and in 1892, Commissioner of Fisheries for Western Australia, a position he held until 1895. During this time he experimented with culturing pearls on Thursday Island; his experiments were successful, and modern-day spherical cultured pearls are primarily the result of discoveries he made. These discoveries were later patented by Dr. Tokichi Nishikawa of Japan, who had heard of Saville-Kent's techniques. Later, Saville-Kent went on to chair the Royal Society of Queensland from 1889 to 1890.

His book documentation of the Great Barrier Reef was the pioneering publication, attracted worldwide attention, and was for decades the definitive work on this landform.

His sister Constance had joined him in Australia in 1886, changing her name to Ruth Emilie Kaye and training as a nurse.

== Fisheries ==
Saville-Kent was a pioneer of the concept of sustainable fisheries. While at the Brighton Aquarium he witnessed a lobster lay eggs and charted the growth and development of the offspring. His goal was to see lobster and other commercial species of fish farmed as a sustainable resource.

Saville-Kent died in 1908, in Bournemouth. He is buried in All Saints' churchyard, Milford on Sea, Hampshire.

== Published works ==
- A Manual of the Infusoria, 1880, 1881, 1882 (3 Vol.)
- The Great Barrier Reef, 1893
- The Naturalist in Australia, 1897 (a copy with better colour correction online at State Library of New South Wales DSM/Q591.99/K)

== See also ==
- Category:Taxa named by William Saville-Kent
