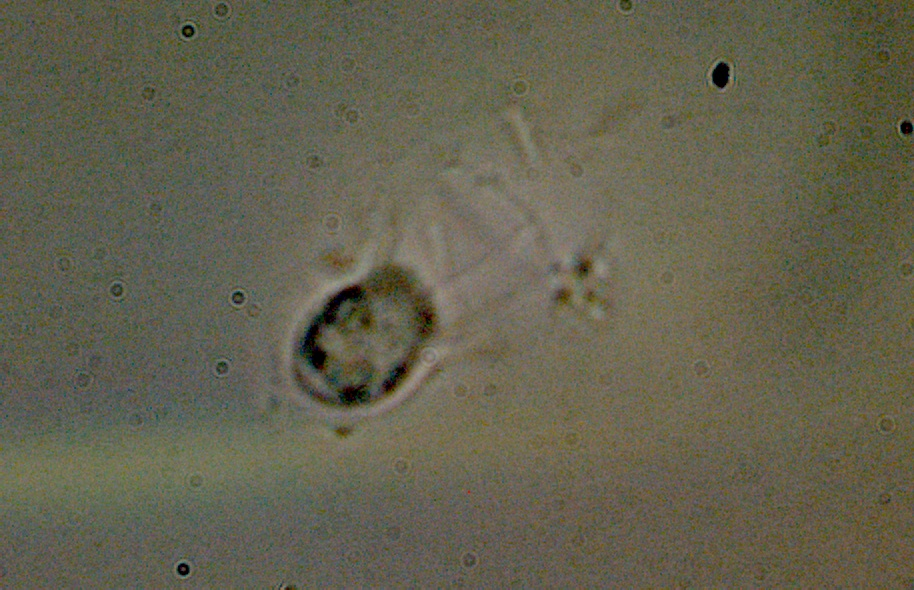
- Stephanoeca diplocostata

Scientific classification
- Domain: Eukaryota
- Clade: Obazoa
- Clade: Opisthokonta
- Clade: Holozoa
- Class: Choanoflagellata
- Order: Acanthoecida

= Acanthoecida =

Order of choanoflagellates

Acanthoecida is an order of Choanoflagellates belonging to the class Choanoflagellatea. It is a type of heterotrophic nanoflagellate that feeds on suspended particles.

Families:

- Acanthoecidae Norris, 1965
- Stephanoecidae Leadbeater in Nitsche et al., 2011
