= Saccocalyx =

Saccocalyx may refer to:

- Saccocalyx (plant), a genus of flowering plant in the family Lamiaceae
- Saccocalyx (sponge), a genus of animals in the family Euplectellidae
