= E. elegans =

E. elegans may refer to:

- Echeveria elegans, a plant species
- Elionurus elegans, a grass species found in Nigeria, Senegal and Burkina Faso
- Eleutherodactylus elegans, a frog species found in Colombia
- Erythroneura elegans, a leafhopper species
- Eryx elegans, a non-venomous snake species found in western Central Asia
- Eudorina elegans, a green alga species
- Eudromia elegans, the elegant crested tinamou or Martineta tinamou, a medium-sized bird species found in southern Chile and Argentina
- Euparyphus elegans, a soldier fly species found in Mexico
- Euphorbia elegans, a plant species

== Synonyms ==
- Eudictyon elegans, a synonym for Corbitella elegans, a glass sponge species found in Indonesia
