= Placosoma =

Placosoma may refer to:

- Placosoma (lizard), a genus of lizards in the family Gymnophthalmidae
- Placosoma (fungus), a genus of fungi in the family Asterinaceae
- Placosoma, a genus of sponges in the family Euplectellidae; synonym of Bolosoma
