= Echinicola rosea =

Scientific classification
- Domain: Bacteria
- Kingdom: Pseudomonadati
- Phylum: Bacteroidota
- Class: Cytophagia
- Order: Cytophagales
- Family: Cyclobacteriaceae
- Genus: Echinicola
- Species: E. rosea

Binomial name
- Echinicola rosea Liang et al. 2016

Type strain
- CGMCC 1.15407, JL3085, NBRC 111782

Synonyms
- Echinicola venus

Species of bacterium

Echinicola rosea is a Gram-negative, rod-shaped, aerobic and halotolerant bacterium from the genus of Echinicola which has been isolated from water from the South China Sea.

== Characteristics ==
Echinicola rosea produces light-pink pigmentation and exhibits gliding motility. Its predominant respiratory quinone is menaquinone-7 (MK-7), while its polar lipid composition includes phosphatidylethanolamine. The DNA G+C content of its type strain, JL3085, is 43.8 mol%. Analysis of its 16S ribosomal RNA gene showed that it was most closely related to Echinicola vietnamensis, with a sequence similarity of 96.8%. The type strain is also deposited in culture collections under the designations NBRC 111782 and CGMCC 1.15407.
