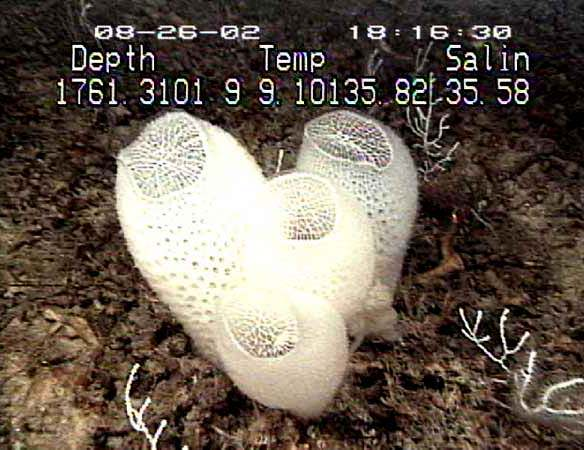
- Euplectella aspergillum, or Venus' Flower Basket, on the ocean floor

Scientific classification
- Kingdom: Animalia
- Phylum: Porifera
- Class: Hexactinellida
- Order: Lyssacinosida
- Family: Euplectellidae
- Subfamily: Euplectellinae
- Genus: Euplectella; Owen, 1841

Type species
- Euplectella aspergillum

= Euplectella =

Genus of sponges

Euplectella is a genus of glass sponges which includes the Venus' Flower Basket. Glass sponges have a skeleton made up of silica spicules that can form geometric patterns. These animals are most commonly found on muddy sea bottoms of the Western Pacific and Indian Ocean. Like all adult sponges, they are sessile and do not move once attached to a rock. They can be found at depths between 100 and 1,000 m, but they are most commonly found at depths greater than 500 m.

== Anatomy and diet ==
Euplectella is a member of the class Hexactinellid or glass sponges. The body of Euplectella is cylindrical and vase-like with a hole at the top, a tubular shape referred to as asconoid. The inner structure of this animal is covered by a layer of choanocytes. The skeleton is made of silica arranged in cylindrical lattice patterns, enabling flexibility and resilience to damage.

Glass sponges are anchored to the seafloor by thousands of spicules, long glassy fibers that are covered with recurved barbs. In Euplectella aspergillum, these high-load-bearing spicules have a solid silica core surrounded by dozens of thin layers that help provide extra tensile strength to anchor the animal. Each thin spicule is only 50 μm in diameter while measuring up to 10 cm (or 100,000 μm) in length.

Euplectella are filter feeders that consume bacteria and small plankton. Water is drawn into their central cavity through the holes in the sides of the sponge. They absorb organic debris and microscopic organisms through this process.

== Reproduction ==
Sea sponges have hermaphroditic properties, "producing both male and female gametes at different times." Euplectella can reproduce both sexually and asexually, resorting to asexual reproduction when conditions are unfavorable. This occurs through the presence of an amoebocyte on a deteriorating sponge. Once the deteriorating sponge is gone, the clump of cells remaining begins to grow a new sponge.

In sexual sea sponge reproduction, gametes are released into the water by male sponges and are absorbed through the inhalant current of the female sponge. An amoebocyte acts as a carrier cell, reaching the ovum alongside the sperm. Fertilization occurs when the sperm reaches the ovum, forming a zygote that then goes through radial holoblastic cleavage. This forms a new free-swimming larvae which will develop into a new sponge.

== Life cycle ==
Euplectella experiences two main life stages: the larval stage and the adult stage. In the larval stage, the larvae are free-flowing in the water. This type of larva is considered trichimella due to its free-swimming nature. Eventually, the larvae attach to rocks and metamorphose into an adult sea sponge.

In the adult stage, Euplectella are sessile and attached firmly to rocks through their spicules. It is unclear how long Euplectella generally live; other genera of glass sponge have been known to live up to 15,000 years in the wild. Although the intricate skeleton of Euplectella provides some protection from predation, starfish are known to eat them.

This species often has a symbiotic relationship with shrimp. Shrimp-like Stenopodidea can breed and live inside the Venus Flower Basket, or Euplectella aspergillum. Stenopodidea offspring leave through holes in the sponge. If the offspring become too large, they become trapped in the basket for the remainder of their lifetime. The pair of male and female Stenopodidea that live inside Euplectella clean it, with the waste the sponge produces serving as food for the Stenopodidea.

== Species ==
- Euplectella aspera
- Euplectella aspergillum
- Euplectella crassistellata
- Euplectella cucumer
- Euplectella curvistellata
- Euplectella gibbsa
- Euplectella imperialis
- Euplectella jovis
- Euplectella marshalli
- Euplectella nobilis
- Euplectella nodosa
- Euplectella oweni
- Euplectella paratetractina
- Euplectella plumosa
- Euplectella sanctipauli
- Euplectella semisimplex
- Euplectella simplex
- Euplectella suberea
- Euplectella timorensis
