= Cyclobacterium jeungdonense =

Scientific classification
- Domain: Bacteria
- Kingdom: Pseudomonadati
- Phylum: Bacteroidota
- Class: Cytophagia
- Order: Cytophagales
- Family: Cyclobacteriaceae
- Genus: Cyclobacterium
- Species: C. jeungdonense

Binomial name
- Cyclobacterium jeungdonense Joung et al. 2014

Type strain
- CECT 7706, HMD3055, KCTC 23150

Species of bacterium

Cyclobacterium jeungdonense is a horseshoe-shaped gram-negative bacterium from the genus of Cyclobacterium which was first isolated in Korea.
