= Euplectella gibbsa =

Scientific classification
- Kingdom: Animalia
- Phylum: Porifera
- Class: Hexactinellida
- Order: Lyssacinosida
- Family: Euplectellidae
- Genus: Euplectella
- Species: E. gibbsa

Binomial name
- Euplectella gibbsa Tabachnick & Collins, 2008

Species of sponge

Euplectella gibbsa is a species of glass sponge in the family Euplectellidae. It has been found in the North Atlantic Ocean.

== Etymology ==
The generic name, Euplectella, is derived from the Latin plecto, meaning "to weave", and the prefix eu-, in reference to the "complexity of the interweaving of its component threads".

The specific epithet, gibbsa, is derived from the Charlie-Gibbs fracture zone, the species' type locality.
