= Belliella pelovolcani =

Scientific classification
- Domain: Bacteria
- Kingdom: Pseudomonadati
- Phylum: Bacteroidota
- Class: Cytophagia
- Order: Cytophagales
- Family: Cyclobacteriaceae
- Genus: Belliella
- Species: B. pelovolcani

Binomial name
- Belliella pelovolcani Arun et al. 2009

Type strain
- BCRC 17883, CC-SAL-25, KCTC 13248

Species of bacterium

Belliella pelovolcani is a Gram-negative and non-motile bacterium from the genus Belliella which has been isolated from a mud-volcano in Wandan in Taiwan.
