= Echinicola pacifica =

Scientific classification
- Domain: Bacteria
- Kingdom: Pseudomonadati
- Phylum: Bacteroidota
- Class: Cytophagia
- Order: Cytophagales
- Family: Cyclobacteriaceae
- Genus: Echinicola
- Species: E. pacifica

Binomial name
- Echinicola pacifica Nedashkovskaya et al. 2006

Type strain
- DSM 19836, KCTC 12368, KMM 6172, LMG 23028, LMG 23350, Vancanneyt R-31437

Species of bacterium

Echinicola pacifica is a heterotrophic and motile bacterium from the genus of Echinicola which has been isolated from the sea urchin Strongylocentrotus intermedius from the Troitsa Bay in the Sea of Japan.
