= Cyclobacterium halophilum =

Scientific classification
- Domain: Bacteria
- Kingdom: Pseudomonadati
- Phylum: Bacteroidota
- Class: Cytophagia
- Order: Cytophagales
- Family: Cyclobacteriaceae
- Genus: Cyclobacterium
- Species: C. halophilum

Binomial name
- Cyclobacterium halophilum Shahinpei et al. 2014

Type strain
- CECT 8341, GASx41, IBRC-M 10761

Species of bacterium

Cyclobacterium halophilum is a Gram-negative, slightly halophilic, horseshoe-shaped and non-motile bacterium from the genus of Cyclobacterium which has been isolated soil from the coastal-marine wetland of Gomishan in Iran.
