= Amphidiscella hosiei =

Scientific classification
- Domain: Eukaryota
- Kingdom: Animalia
- Phylum: Porifera
- Class: Hexactinellida
- Order: Lyssacinosida
- Family: Euplectellidae
- Genus: Amphidiscella
- Species: A. hosiei

Binomial name
- Amphidiscella hosiei Tabachnick & Fromont, 2019

Species of sponge

Holotype site'"`UNIQ--ref-00000006-QINU`"'

Amphidiscella hosiei is a species of glass sponge in the family Euplectellidae, first found in the Perth Canyon at a depth of 695 m, off the Western Australian coast.
