= Algoriphagus ratkowskyi =

Scientific classification
- Domain: Bacteria
- Kingdom: Pseudomonadati
- Phylum: Bacteroidota
- Class: Cytophagia
- Order: Cytophagales
- Family: Cyclobacteriaceae
- Genus: Algoriphagus
- Species: A. ratkowskyi

Binomial name
- Algoriphagus ratkowskyi Bowman et al. 2003

Species of bacterium

Algoriphagus ratkowskyi is a bacterium. It is non-motile, strictly aerobic and saccharolytic.
