= Mesohyl =

Gelatinous matrix within a sponge

The mesohyl, formerly known as mesenchyme or as mesoglea, is the gelatinous matrix within a sponge. It fills the space between the external pinacoderm and the internal choanoderm. The mesohyl resembles a type of connective tissue and contains several amoeboid cells such as amebocytes, as well as fibrils and skeletal elements. For a long time, it has been largely accepted that sponges lack true tissue, but it is currently debated as to whether mesohyl and pinacoderm layers are tissues.

The mesohyl is composed of the following main elements: collagen, fibronectin-like molecules, galectin, and a minor component, dermatopontin. These polypeptides form the extracellular matrix which provides the platform for specific cell adhesion as well as for signal transduction and cellular growth.

The mesohyl includes a noncellular colloidal mesoglea with embedded collagen fibers, spicules and various cells, being as such a type of mesenchyme.

== Bibliography ==
- Lytle, Charles F.; Meyer, John R. (May 21, 2004). General Zoology Laboratory Guide (Fourteenth ed.). New York: McGraw-Hill. ISBN 978-0-07-234900-9.
- Müller, Werner E.G. (February 2003). "The Origin of Metazoan Complexity: Porifera as Integrated Animals". Integrative and Comparative Biology. 43 (1): 3–10. doi:10.1093/icb/43.1.3. JSTOR 3884834. PMID 21680404.
