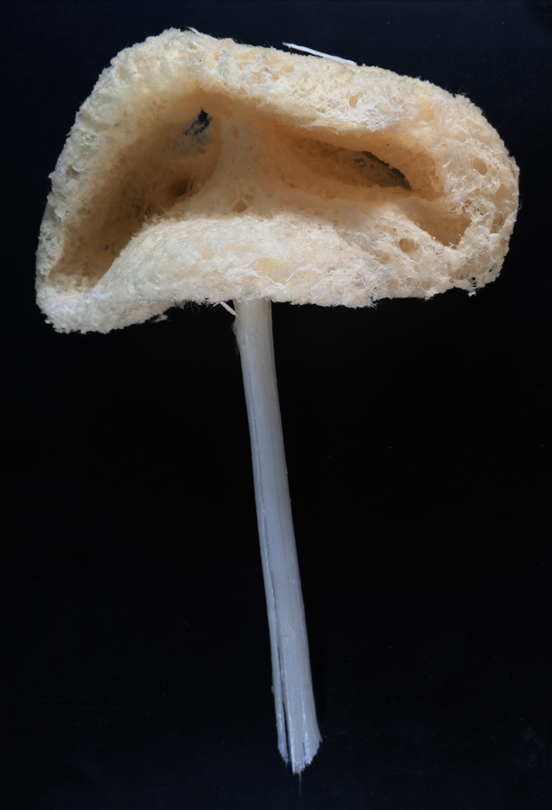

Scientific classification
- Kingdom: Animalia
- Phylum: Porifera
- Class: Hexactinellida
- Order: Lyssacinosida
- Family: Euplectellidae
- Genus: Advhena; Castello-Branco, Collins, Hajdu, 2020
- Species: A. magnifica

Binomial name
- Advhena magnifica (Castello-Branco, Collins, Hajdu, 2020)

= Advhena =

Genus of sponges

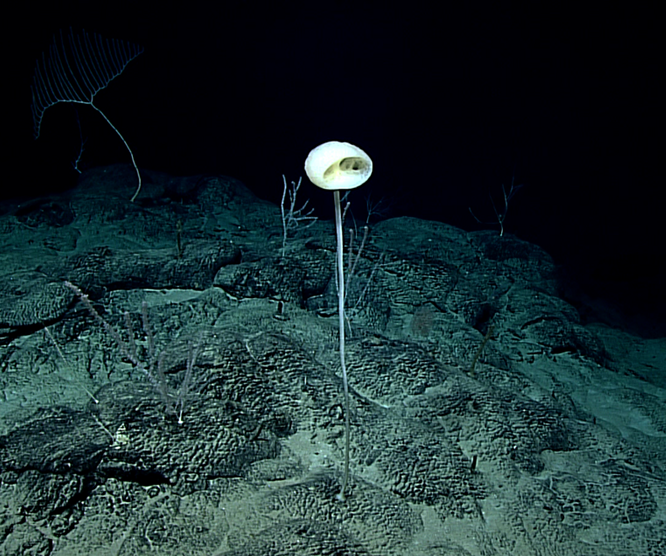
A. magnifica in its natural habitat

Advhena is a monotypic genus of glass sponges in the family Euplectellidae. It contains the single species Advhena magnifica, also known as the E.T. sponge, after the titular character in the film E.T. the Extra-Terrestrial.

== Taxonomy ==
Advhena magnifica was first found in 2016 by scientists on the NOAAS Okeanos Explorer on Pigafetta Guyot, east of the Mariana Trench at a depth of 2,028 metres (6,654 ft). Before description, it was thought to be in the genus Bolosoma. Its holotype is numbered USNM 1424107 and was described in 2020.

The genus name, Advhena, is derived from the Latin word advena, meaning alien, due to its elongated head and neck and large "eyes." An "h" was added to the word to distinguish it from the gastropod genus Advena. The specific epithet, magnifica, is Latin for magnificent.

== Description ==
This sponge has a somewhat flattened spherical body, with a large lateral opening on one side of the body measuring about 50 millimetres (2.0 in). The body, which is 136 millimetres (5.4 in) in diameter, is held up by a lengthy peduncle longer than 154 millimetres (6.1 in), at least four times the size of the body. Spicules in the choanosome are diactine, meaning that they have two arms.

== Distribution ==
Advhena magnifica is native to the Pacific Ocean.
