= Amphidiscella lecus =

Scientific classification
- Kingdom: Animalia
- Phylum: Porifera
- Class: Hexactinellida
- Order: Lyssacinosida
- Family: Euplectellidae
- Genus: Amphidiscella
- Species: A. lecus

Binomial name
- Amphidiscella lecus Reiswig, 2014

Species of sponge

Amphidiscella lecus is a species of sea sponge first found at the bottom of shelf, canyon and seamounts of the west coast of Washington, British Columbia and the Gulf of Alaska.
