= Euplectella paratetractina =

Scientific classification
- Kingdom: Animalia
- Phylum: Porifera
- Class: Hexactinellida
- Order: Lyssacinosida
- Family: Euplectellidae
- Genus: Euplectella
- Species: E. paratetractina

Binomial name
- Euplectella paratetractina Tabachnick, Janussen & Menschenina, 2008, 2008

Species of sponge

Euplectella paratetractina is a species of glass sponge in the family Euplectellidae. It has been found in waters off the coast of Australia.

== Etymology ==
The generic name, Euplectella, is derived from the Latin plecto, meaning "to weave", and the prefix eu-, in reference to the "complexity of the interweaving of its component threads".

The specific epithet, paratetractina, was given due to the large abundance of paratetractins within certain spicules of the species.
