= Echinicola jeungdonensis =

Scientific classification
- Domain: Bacteria
- Kingdom: Pseudomonadati
- Phylum: Bacteroidota
- Class: Cytophagia
- Order: Cytophagales
- Family: Cyclobacteriaceae
- Genus: Echinicola
- Species: E. jeungdonensis

Binomial name
- Echinicola jeungdonensis Kim et al. 2011

Type strain
- CECT 7682, HMD3054, KCTC 23122

Species of bacterium

Echinicola jeungdonensis is a non-motile bacterium from the genus of Echinicola which has been isolated from a solar saltern in Jeungdo in Korea.
