= Belliella kenyensis =

Scientific classification
- Domain: Bacteria
- Kingdom: Pseudomonadati
- Phylum: Bacteroidota
- Class: Cytophagia
- Order: Cytophagales
- Family: Cyclobacteriaceae
- Genus: Belliella
- Species: B. kenyensis

Binomial name
- Belliella kenyensis Akhwale et al. 2015

Type strain
- No. 164, CECT 8551, DSM 46651

Synonyms
- Belliella keniaensis

Species of bacterium

Belliella kenyensis is a Gram-negative and aerobic bacterium from the genus Belliella which has been isolated from lake sediments from the alkaline Lake Elmenteita from the Kenyan Rift Valley in Kenya.
