= Belliella aquatica =

Scientific classification
- Domain: Bacteria
- Kingdom: Pseudomonadati
- Phylum: Bacteroidota
- Class: Cytophagia
- Order: Cytophagales
- Family: Cyclobacteriaceae
- Genus: Belliella
- Species: B. aquatica

Binomial name
- Belliella aquatica Zhong et al. 2015

Type strain
- TS-T86, CGMCC 1.12479, JCM 19468

Species of bacterium

Belliella aquatica is a Gram-negative, strictly heterotrophic, aerobic, non-spore-forming and non-motile bacterium from the genus Belliella which has been isolated from the saline lake Lake Tuosu from the Qaidam Basin in China.
