= Euplectella cucumer =

Scientific classification
- Domain: Eukaryota
- Kingdom: Animalia
- Phylum: Porifera
- Class: Hexactinellida
- Order: Lyssacinosida
- Family: Euplectellidae
- Genus: Euplectella
- Species: E. cucumer

Binomial name
- Euplectella cucumer Owen, 1857

Species of sponge

Euplectella cucumer is a species of glass sponge in the family Euplectellidae. It has been found around the Seychelles.

== Etymology ==
The generic name, Euplectella, is derived from the Latin plecto, meaning "to weave", and the prefix eu-, in reference to the "complexity of the interweaving of its component threads".

The specific epithet, cucumer, is derived from the Latin cucumeris, meaning "cucumber", due to the fact that the shape of the species' body resembles a cucumber.
