= Cyclobacterium xiamenense =

Scientific classification
- Domain: Bacteria
- Kingdom: Pseudomonadati
- Phylum: Bacteroidota
- Class: Cytophagia
- Order: Cytophagales
- Family: Cyclobacteriaceae
- Genus: Cyclobacterium
- Species: C. xiamenense

Binomial name
- Cyclobacterium xiamenense Chen et al. 2014

Type strain
- CGMCC 1.12432, KD51, KCTC 32253

Synonyms
- Cyclobacterium xiamenensis

Species of bacterium

Cyclobacterium xiamenense is a horseshoe-shaped, Gram-negative and non-motile bacterium from the genus of Cyclobacterium which has been isolated from the alga Chlorella autotrophica from the coastal sea of Xiamen in China.
