= Belliella baltica =

Scientific classification
- Domain: Bacteria
- Kingdom: Pseudomonadati
- Phylum: Bacteroidota
- Class: Cytophagia
- Order: Cytophagales
- Family: Cyclobacteriaceae
- Genus: Belliella
- Species: B. baltica

Binomial name
- Belliella baltica Brettar et al. 2004

Type strain
- BA13, CIP 108006, DSM 15883, LMG 21964

Synonyms
- Bella baltica Bellia baltica

Species of bacterium

Belliella baltica is a Gram-negative and rod-shaped bacterium from the genus Belliella which has been isolated from water from the Baltic Sea.
