= Euplectella sanctipauli =

Scientific classification
- Kingdom: Animalia
- Phylum: Porifera
- Class: Hexactinellida
- Order: Lyssacinosida
- Family: Euplectellidae
- Genus: Euplectella
- Species: E. sanctipauli

Binomial name
- Euplectella sanctipauli Castello-Branco, Collins & Hajdu, 2020

Species of sponge

Euplectella sanctipauli is a species of glass sponge in the family Euplectellidae. It is known from type specimens found off the coast of Brazil.

== Etymology ==
The generic name, Euplectella, is derived from the Latin plecto, meaning "to weave", and the prefix eu-, in reference to the "complexity of the interweaving of its component threads".

The specific epithet, sanctipauli, is derived from the São Paulo Ridge in the southwest Atlantic Ocean, the type locality of the species.
