= Cyclobacterium caenipelagi =

Scientific classification
- Domain: Bacteria
- Kingdom: Pseudomonadati
- Phylum: Bacteroidota
- Class: Cytophagia
- Order: Cytophagales
- Family: Cyclobacteriaceae
- Genus: Cyclobacterium
- Species: C. caenipelagi

Binomial name
- Cyclobacterium caenipelagi Jung et al. 2013

Type strain
- CCUG 63247, HD-17, KCTC 32178

Species of bacterium

Cyclobacterium caenipelagi is a Gram-negative and aerobic bacterium from the genus of Cyclobacterium which has been isolated from tidal flat sediments in Korea.
