= Cyclobacterium qasimii =

Scientific classification
- Domain: Bacteria
- Kingdom: Pseudomonadati
- Phylum: Bacteroidota
- Class: Cytophagia
- Order: Cytophagales
- Family: Cyclobacteriaceae
- Genus: Cyclobacterium
- Species: C. qasimii

Binomial name
- Cyclobacterium qasimii Shivaji et al. 2012

Type strain
- KCTC 23011, NBRC 106168, M12-11B

Species of bacterium

Cyclobacterium qasimii is a horseshoe-shaped, psychrotolerant and non-motile bacterium from the genus of Cyclobacterium which has been isolated from marine sediments from Kongsfjorden in Svalbard.
