= Cyclobacterium marinum =

Scientific classification
- Domain: Bacteria
- Kingdom: Pseudomonadati
- Phylum: Bacteroidota
- Class: Cytophagia
- Order: Cytophagales
- Family: Cyclobacteriaceae
- Genus: Cyclobacterium
- Species: C. marinum

Binomial name
- Cyclobacterium marinum corrig. (Raj 1976) Raj and Maloy 1990

Type strain
- ATCC 25205, CCM 2503, CECT 5007, CGMCC 1.2808, DSM 745, KCTC 12171, KCTC 2917, LMG 13164, NCIB 1802, NCIMB 1802, Raj, strain Johnson

Synonyms
- Cyclobacterium marinus, Flectobacillus marinus, Microcyclus marinus

Species of bacterium

Cyclobacterium marinum is a bacterium from the genus of Cyclobacterium which has been isolated from coelomic fluid of a sand dollar from the Newport Beach in the United States. "cyclobacterium marinum" produces homospermidine
