= Echinicola sediminis =

Scientific classification
- Domain: Bacteria
- Kingdom: Pseudomonadati
- Phylum: Bacteroidota
- Class: Cytophagia
- Order: Cytophagales
- Family: Cyclobacteriaceae
- Genus: Echinicola
- Species: E. sediminis

Binomial name
- Echinicola sediminis Lee et al. 2017

Type strain
- DSM 103729, 001-Na2, JCM 31786, KCTC 52495

Species of bacterium

Echinicola sediminis is a Gram-negative, rod-shaped and aerobic bacterium from the genus of Echinicola which has been isolated from beach sediments from the Yellow Sea from Sindu-ri in Korea.
