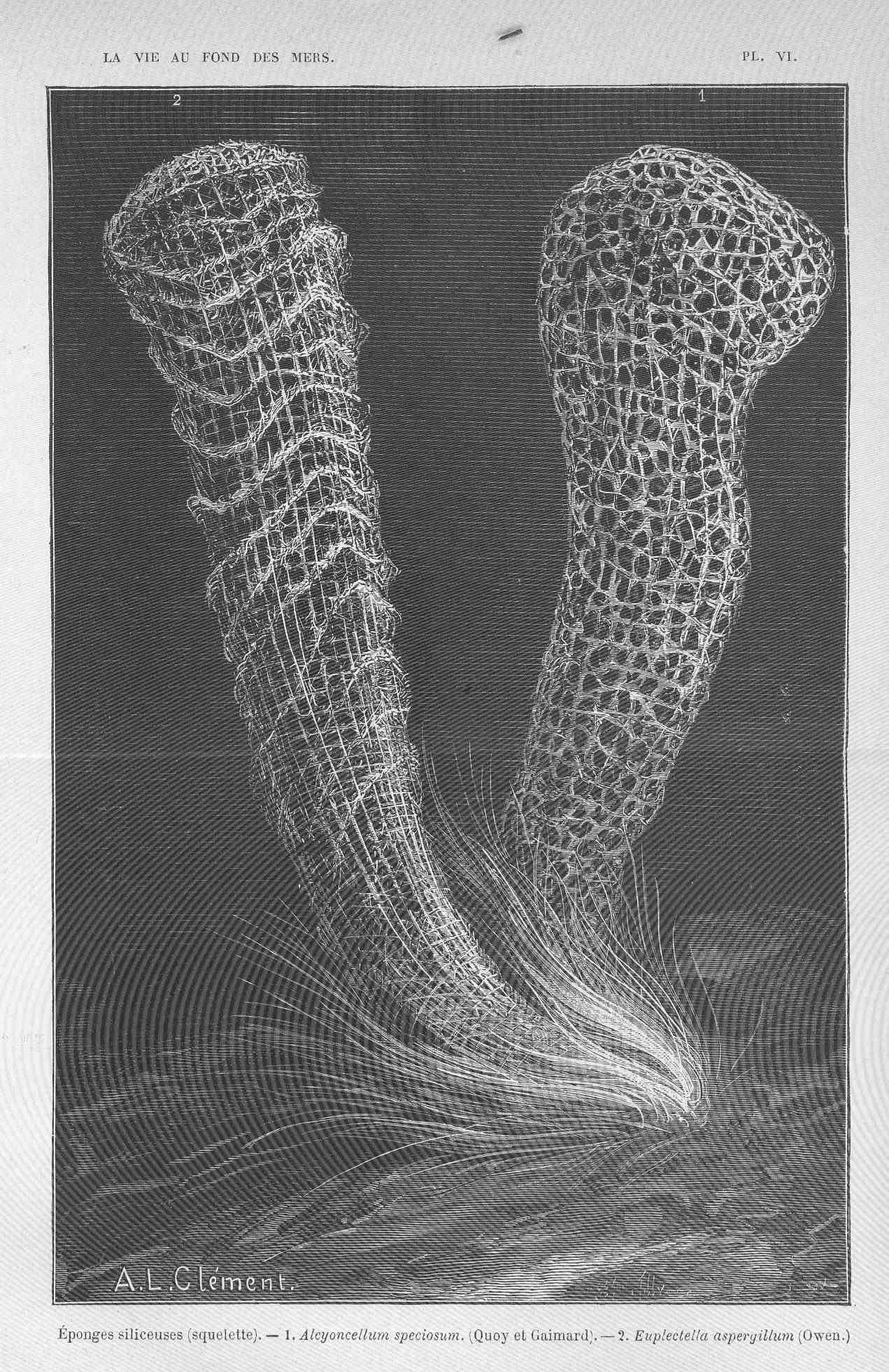
- Illustration by A. L. Clement: glass sponges (skeleton).-1. Alcyoncellum speciosum. (Quoy et Gaimard).-2. Euplectella aspergillum (Owen), in Filhol, H. (1885) Vie au Fond des Mers : les Explorations Sous-Marines et les Voyages du Travailleur et du Talisman, Paris: G. Masson, Editeur

Scientific classification
- Domain: Eukaryota
- Kingdom: Animalia
- Phylum: Porifera
- Class: Hexactinellida
- Order: Lyssacinosida
- Family: Euplectellidae
- Subfamily: Corbitellinae
- Genus: Corbitella; Gray, 1867

Species
- Corbitella discasterosa Tabachnick & Lévi, 2004; Corbitella elegans (Marshall, 1875); Corbitella pulchra (Schulze, 1887); Corbitella speciosa (Quoy & Gaimard, 1833)

Synonyms
- List: Alcyoncellum Quoy & Gaimard, 1833; Eudictyon Marshall, 1875; Eudictyum Marshall, 1875; Habrodictyon Thomson, 1868; Habrodictyum Schulze, 1887; Taegeria Schulze, 1886

= Corbitella =

Genus of sponges

Corbitella is a genus of glass sponges (Hexactinellids) belonging to the family Euplectellidae.
