= Aquiflexum balticum =

Scientific classification
- Domain: Bacteria
- Kingdom: Pseudomonadati
- Phylum: Bacteroidota
- Class: Cytophagia
- Order: Cytophagales
- Family: Cyclobacteriaceae
- Genus: Aquiflexum
- Species: A. balticum

Binomial name
- Aquiflexum balticum Brettar et al. 2004

Type strain
- BA160 T, CIP 108445, DSM 16537, LMG 22565, VTT E-072684

Species of bacterium

Aquiflexum balticum is a gram-negative bacterium from the genus of Aquiflexum which has been isolated from water from the Baltic Sea.
