= Belliella buryatensis =

Scientific classification
- Domain: Bacteria
- Kingdom: Pseudomonadati
- Phylum: Bacteroidota
- Class: Cytophagia
- Order: Cytophagales
- Family: Cyclobacteriaceae
- Genus: Belliella
- Species: B. buryatensis

Binomial name
- Belliella buryatensis Kozyreva et al. 2016

Type strain
- 2C, 5C, KCTC 32194, VKM B-2724

Species of bacterium

Belliella buryatensis is a Gram-negative and non-motile bacterium from the genus Belliella which has been isolated from alkaline lake water from the Lake Solenoe in Buryatia in Russia.
