= Cyclobacterium lianum =

Scientific classification
- Domain: Bacteria
- Kingdom: Pseudomonadati
- Phylum: Bacteroidota
- Class: Cytophagia
- Order: Cytophagales
- Family: Cyclobacteriaceae
- Genus: Cyclobacterium
- Species: C. lianum

Binomial name
- Cyclobacterium lianum Ying et al. 2006

Type strain
- CGMCC 1.6102, HY9, JCM 14011

Synonyms
- Cyclobacterium linum

Species of bacterium

Cyclobacterium lianum is a horseshoe-shaped, heterotrophic, aerobic and non-motile bacterium from the genus of Cyclobacterium which has been isolated from sediments from the Xijiang oilfield of the South China Sea in China.
