= Cyclobacterium amurskyense =

Scientific classification
- Domain: Bacteria
- Kingdom: Pseudomonadati
- Phylum: Bacteroidota
- Class: Cytophagia
- Order: Cytophagales
- Family: Cyclobacteriaceae
- Genus: Cyclobacterium
- Species: C. amurskyense

Binomial name
- Cyclobacterium amurskyense Nedashkovskaya et al. 2005

Type strain
- CIP 108848, KCTC 12363, KMM 6143, LMG 23026, Nedashkovskaya V1SW 70

Synonyms
- Cyclobacterium amurskyensis

Species of bacterium

Cyclobacterium amurskyense is a heterotrophic, aerobic and non-motile bacterium from the genus of Cyclobacterium which has been isolated from sea water.
