= Belliella marina =

Scientific classification
- Domain: Bacteria
- Kingdom: Pseudomonadati
- Phylum: Bacteroidota
- Class: Cytophagia
- Order: Cytophagales
- Family: Cyclobacteriaceae
- Genus: Belliella
- Species: B. marina

Binomial name
- Belliella marina Song et al. 2015

Species of bacterium

Belliella marina is a Gram-negative, rod-shaped and strictly aerobic bacterium from the genus Belliella which has been isolated from seawater from the Indian Ocean.
