= Echinicola vietnamensis =

Scientific classification
- Domain: Bacteria
- Kingdom: Pseudomonadati
- Phylum: Bacteroidota
- Class: Cytophagia
- Order: Cytophagales
- Family: Cyclobacteriaceae
- Genus: Echinicola
- Species: E. vietnamensis

Binomial name
- Echinicola vietnamensis Nedashkovskaya et al. 2007

Type strain
- 534, CIP 109902, DSM 17526, KCTC 12713, KMM 6221, LMG 23754, R-32916

Species of bacterium

Echinicola vietnamensis is a heterotrophic and halotolerant bacterium from the genus of Echinicola which has been isolated from seawater from a musselfarm from the Nha Trang Bay in Vietnam.
