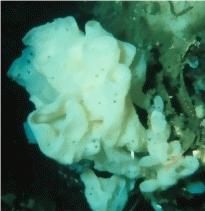
- Atlantisella sp.

Scientific classification
- Kingdom: Animalia
- Phylum: Porifera
- Class: Hexactinellida
- Order: Lyssacinosida
- Family: Euplectellidae
- Subfamily: Corbitellinae
- Genus: Atlantisella; Tabachnick, 2002

Type species
- Atlantisella incognita Tabachnick, 2002

Species
- Atlantisella incognita Tabachnick, 2002; Atlantisella lorraineae Reiswig & Kelly, 2017

= Atlantisella =

Genus of sponges

Atlantisella is a genus of glass sponges (Hexactinellids) belonging to the family Euplectellidae, first described in 2002 by Konstantin Tabachnick.

Species of this genus are found off the coast of New Zealand, in the central Pacific and off the west coast of the United States.
