= Amphidiscella =

Scientific classification
- Kingdom: Animalia
- Phylum: Porifera
- Class: Hexactinellida
- Order: Lyssacinosida
- Family: Euplectellidae
- Subfamily: Bolosominae
- Genus: Amphidiscella; Tabachnick & Lévi, 1997

Genus of sponges

Amphidiscella is a genus of sea sponge in the family Euplectellidae.

== Species ==
The following species are accepted within Amphidiscella:

- Amphidiscella abyssalis Reiswig & Kelly, 2018
- Amphidiscella atlantica Tabachnick & Collins, 2008
- Amphidiscella caledonica Tabachnick & Lévi, 1997
- Amphidiscella hosiei Tabachnick & Fromont, 2019
- Amphidiscella lecus Reiswig, 2014
- Amphidiscella levii Domingos, Kersken, Schuster & Xavier, 2026
- Amphidiscella monai Tabachnick & Lévi, 1997
- Amphidiscella sonnae Reiswig & Kelly, 2018
