= Cyclobacterium =

Scientific classification
- Domain: Bacteria
- Kingdom: Pseudomonadati
- Phylum: Bacteroidota
- Class: Cytophagia
- Order: Cytophagales
- Family: Cyclobacteriaceae
- Genus: Cyclobacterium; Raj and Maloy 1990

Type species
- Cyclobacterium marinum

Species
- C. amurskyense C. caenipelagi C. halophilum C. jeungdonense C. lianum C. marinum C. qasimii C. xiamenense

Synonyms
- Cyclibacterium

Genus of bacteria

Cyclobacterium is a mesophilic, neutrophilic, chemoorganotrophic and aerobic bacterial genus from the family of Cyclobacteriaceae. Cyclobacterium bacteria occur in marine habitats
