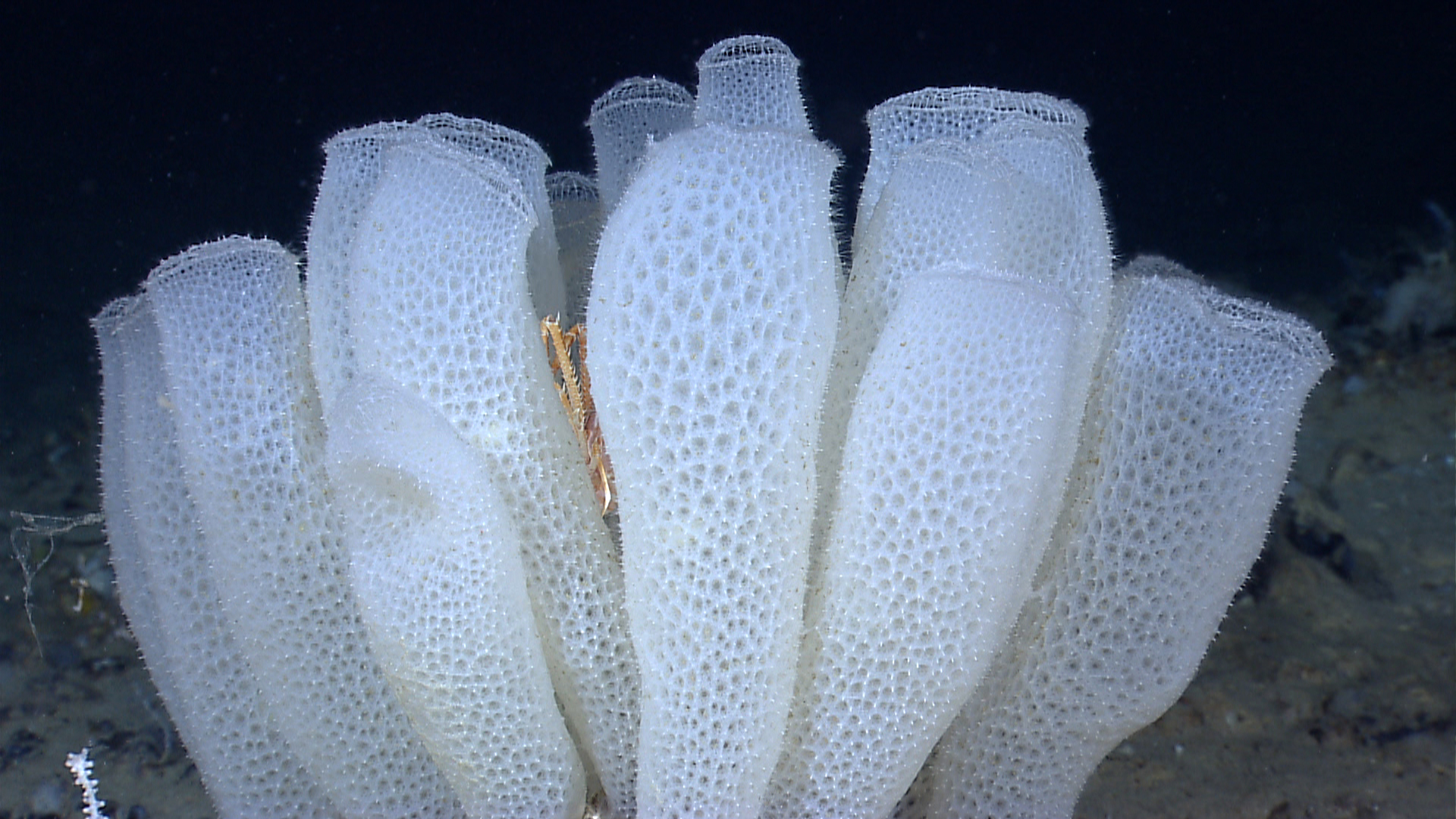
- Venus' flower basket clonal buds
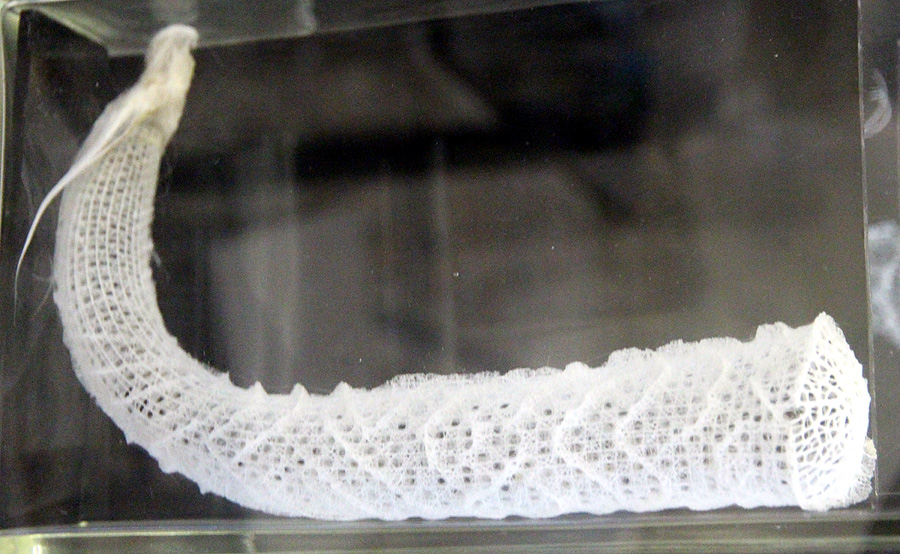
- Specimen

Scientific classification
- Kingdom: Animalia
- Phylum: Porifera
- Class: Hexactinellida
- Order: Lyssacinosida
- Family: Euplectellidae
- Genus: Euplectella
- Species: E. aspergillum

Binomial name
- Euplectella aspergillum Owen, 1841

= Venus' flower basket =

Species of glass sponge

The Venus' flower basket (Euplectella aspergillum) is a species of glass sponge found in the deep waters of the Pacific Ocean, usually at depths below 500 m (1,600 ft). Like other glass sponges, they build their skeletons out of silica, which forms a unique lattice structure consisting of spicules. This body structure is of great interest in materials science as the optical and mechanical properties are in some ways superior to man-made materials. Like other sponges, they feed by filtering sea water to capture plankton and marine snow. Little is known regarding their reproductive habits, though the fluid dynamics of their body structure likely influence reproduction and it is hypothesized that they may be hermaphroditic.

== Taxonomy ==
Euplectella aspergillum was described in 1841 by Sir Richard Owen. As the genus Euplectella was named to accommodate this species, it is the type of its genus. Owen describes it as "...one of the most singular and beautiful, as well as the rarest of the marine productions...", but placed in "the very lowest class of the animal kingdom", if it even could be considered an animal, classifying it in the Alcyonoid family. The specimen he examined was 8 in (200 mm) in length, 2 in (51 mm) across the base, and 1 in (25 mm) across the apex of the skeleton. 4 subspecies are accepted;

- E. aspergillum aspergillum Owen, 1841 (Nominate)
- E. aspergillum regalis Schulze, 1900
- E. aspergillum australica Tabachnick, Janussen & Menshenina, 2008
- E. aspergillum indonesica Tabachnick, Janussen & Menshenina, 2008

== Morphology ==
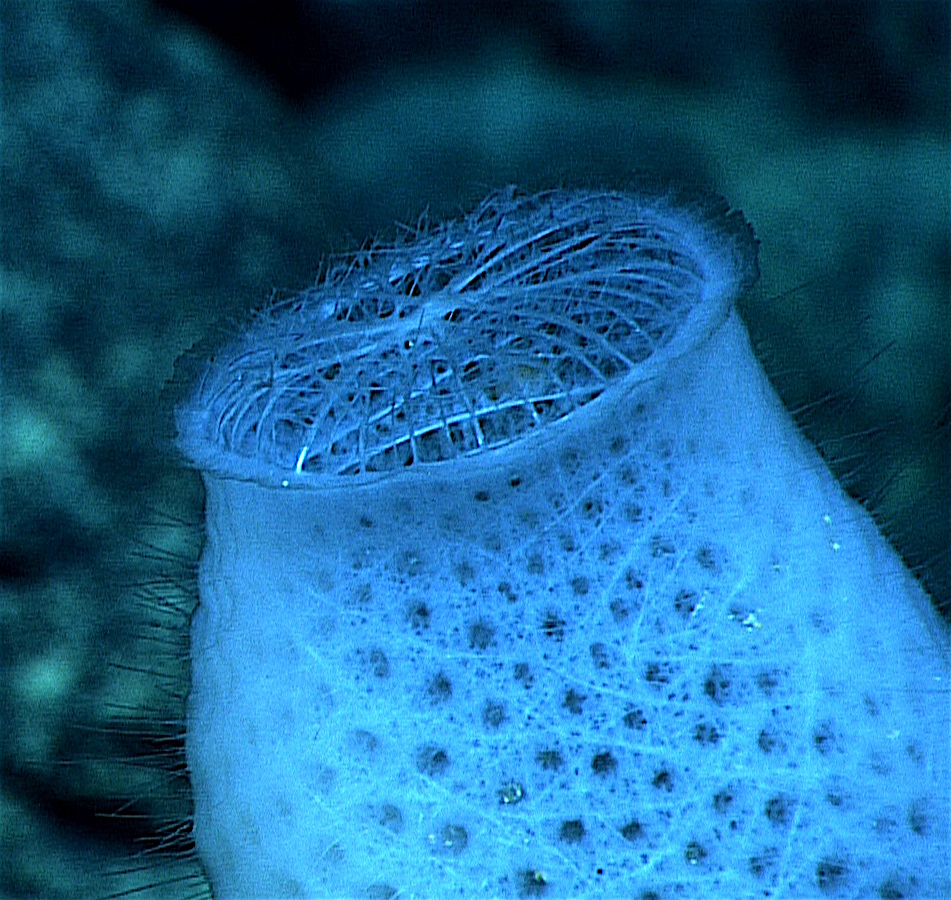
Closeup of intricate lattice of the Venus' flower basket

The body is tubular, curved and basket- or vase-like in shape. The body is composed entirely of silica (the main constituent of glass) which is why they are commonly known as glass sponges; the silica makes up the form of six-pointed siliceous spicules (composed of three perpendicular rays, giving them six points). In the case of glass sponges, the spicules "weave" together to form a very fine mesh, which gives the sponge's body a rigidity not found in other sponge species and allows glass sponges to survive at great depths in the water column. The body is perforated by numerous apertures (there are many holes that lead into the body cavity), which are not true ostia but simply parietal gaps. The structure of the sponge is syconoid; the ostia connects to incurrent canals, on through the radial canals and into prosopyles that open into the spongocoel, the central "atrium", and to the outside through the osculum. The sponges are usually between 10 cm (3.9 in) and 30 cm (12 in) tall.

E. aspergillum is distinguished in having anchorate basalia with six teeth, and diactins.

The skeleton of these sponges also contain silica nanoparticles among other biomaterials.

== Habitat ==
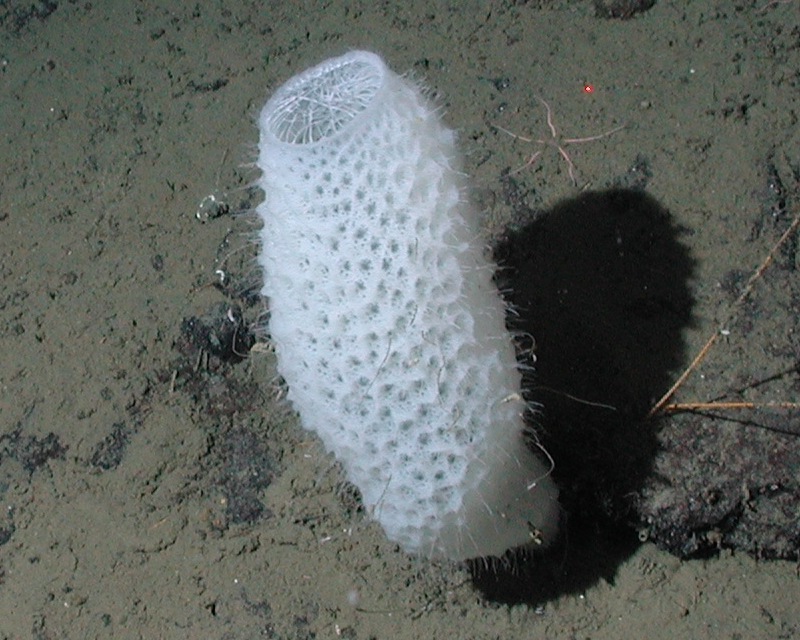
Euplectella aspergillum at a depth of 2,572 m (8,438 ft)

Venus' flower baskets are found in the western Pacific Ocean nearby the Philippine Islands. Other species of this genus occur throughout oceans around the world, including near Japan and in the Indian Ocean.

This sponge's habitat is on rocky areas of the seafloor, where it lives and grows connected to hard substrate for its entire life. It can be found from 100–1,000 m (330–3,280 ft) below the ocean's surface, and is most common at depths greater than 500 m (1,600 ft). More specifically, they tend to anchor in soft sediments due to the nature of their spicules.

This sponge can often be found inhabiting loose, muddy sediments, causing them to develop a structure that keeps them rooted to the sea floor.

== Biology ==
It is speculated that the sponge harnesses bioluminescence to attract plankton.

Hexactinellids in the Pacific ocean form reefs, which may collect carbon in deep sea environments.

=== Reproduction ===
Little is known about the reproduction of these sponges. Sperm was found in one sample of E. aspergillum, within the connective tissue, and was described as aggregated clusters within very fine, thread-like appendages. This would contribute to the idea of the species being hermaphroditic. While these sponges are sessile, the sperm can be carried by the current and the ova that a different organism retained can be fertilized.

Their peculiar skeletal structures have been found to have important fluid-dynamic effects on both reducing the drag experienced by the sponge and in promoting coherent swirling motions inside the body cavity, arguably to promote selective filter feeding and sexual reproduction. In a study performed by a group of Italian researchers, a three-dimensional model of Venus' Flower Basket was utilized to simulate the flow of water molecules in and out of its lattice. The researchers found that, while reducing the sponge's drag, it also created minute vortices inside the sponge which facilitated the mixing of its sperm and eggs.

=== Symbiosis ===
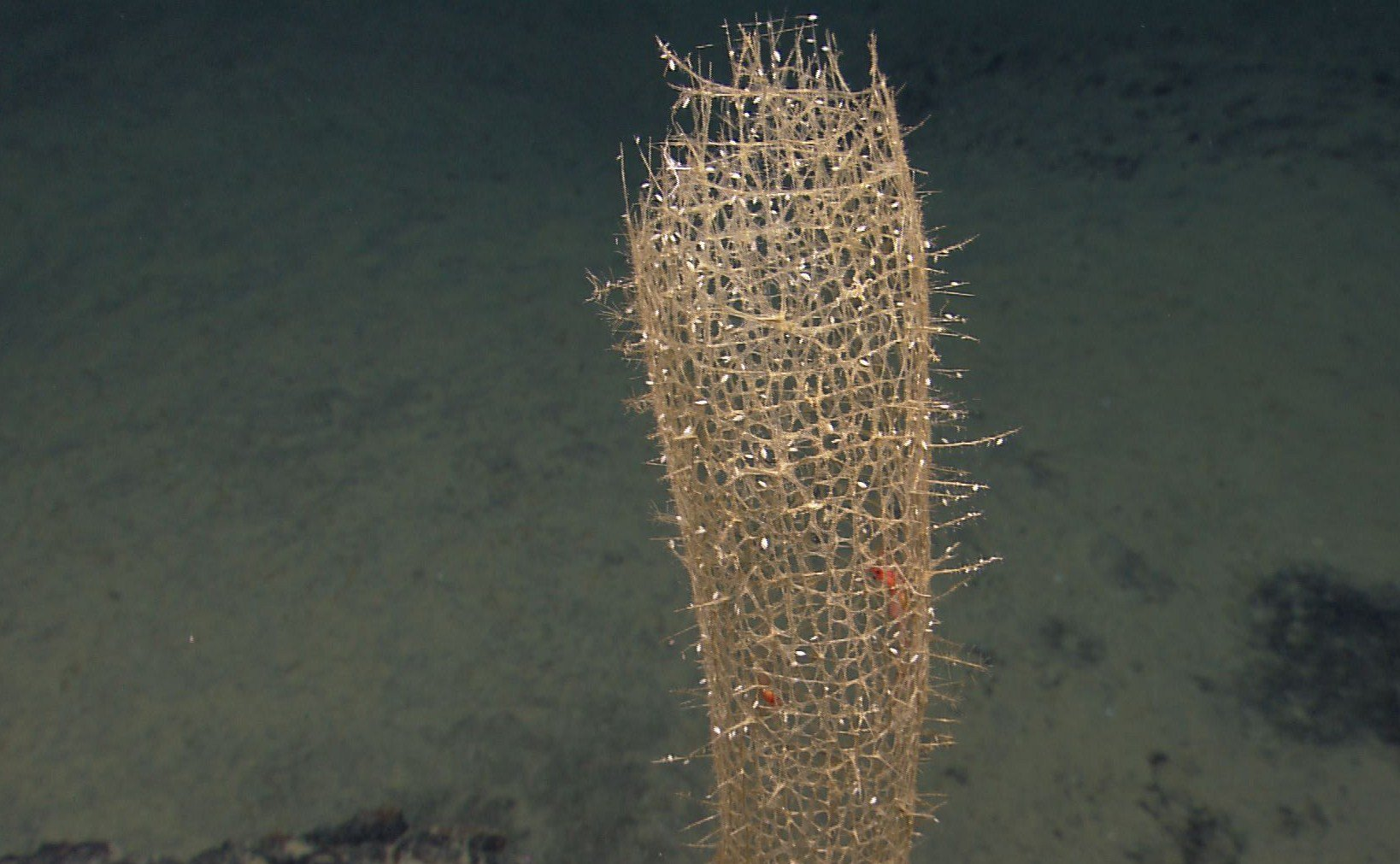
Red shrimp can be seen encased by the glass sponge

The sponges are often found to house glass sponge shrimp, usually a breeding pair, who typically enter the sponge early in life and eventually grow to a size where they are no longer able to exit the sponge's lattice. It is thought that the structure of the glass sponge is advantageous for shrimp living inside of its lattice, as they feed on particles that the sponges collect. Consequently, they live in and around these sponges, where the shrimp perform a mutualistic relationship with the sponge until they die. The shrimp live and mate in the shelter that the sponge provides, and in return they also clean the inside of the sponge. This may have influenced the adoption of the sponge as a symbol of undying love in Japan, where the skeletons of these sponges are presented as wedding gifts.

== Anthropomorphic applications ==
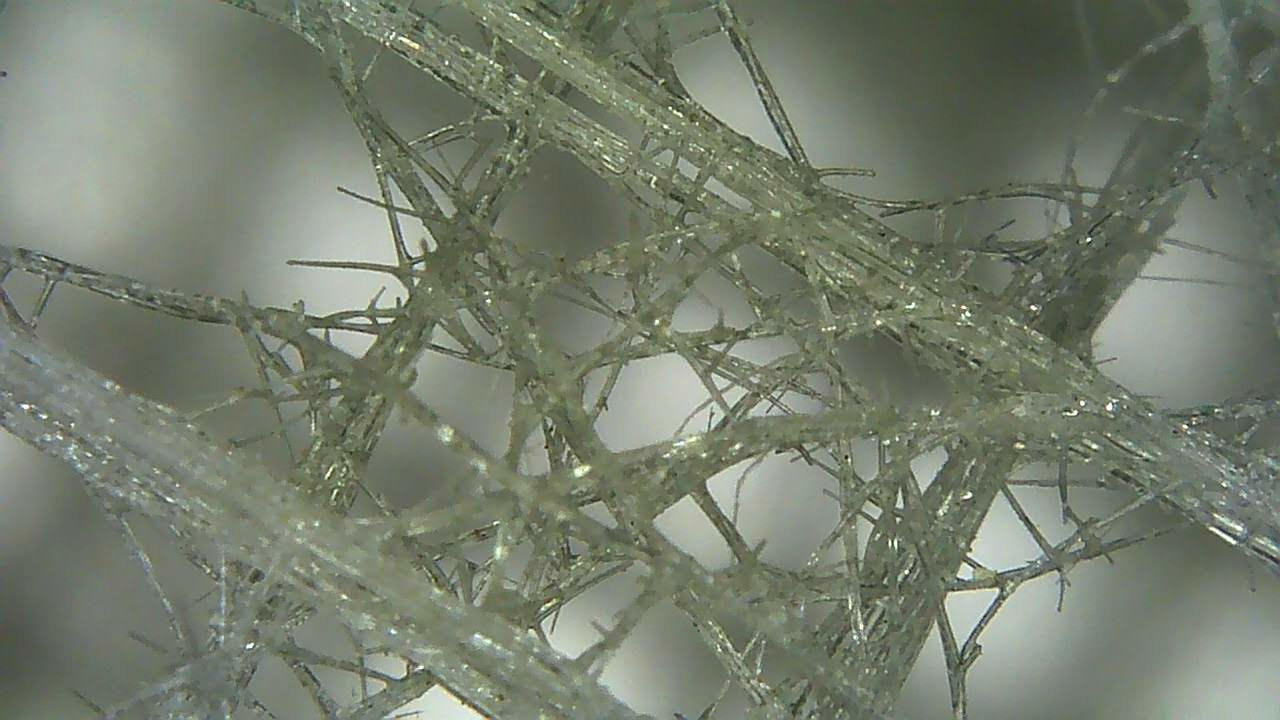
Silica spicules of Euplectella aspergillum

The glassy fibers that attach the sponge to the ocean floor, 5–20 cm (2.0–7.9 in) long and thin as human hair, are of interest to fiber optics researchers. The sponge extracts silicic acid from seawater and converts it into silica, then forms it into an elaborate skeleton of glass fibers. Other classes of sponge such as the orange puffball sponge (Tethya aurantium, a demosponge) can also produce glass biologically. The current manufacturing process for optical fibers requires high temperatures and produces a brittle fiber. A low-temperature process for creating and arranging such fibers, inspired by sponges, could offer more control over the optical properties of the fibers. These nano-structures are also potentially useful for the creation of more efficient, low-cost solar cells. Furthermore, its skeletal structure has inspired a new type of structural lattice with a higher strength to weight ratio than other diagonally reinforced square lattices used in engineering applications.

These sponges skeletons have complex geometric configurations, which have been extensively studied for their stiffness, yield strength, and minimal crack propagation. An aluminium tube (aluminium and glass have similar elastic modulus) of equal length, effective thickness, and radius, but homogeneously distributed, has 1/100 the stiffness.

In a study done with various glass sponges, Venus' Flower Basket was noted to be difficult to extract any further information because of how inaccessible it serves to be. However, when in contact with alkali, these sponges showed a high resistance, which then led researchers to believe that they potentially contain biomaterials like chitin, that could serve as a structural component to this species. This study suggests that as long as E. aspergillum and similar species are natural composites containing valuable biomaterials, they could be important in biomedicine and future biotechnology.

Rao's work on biomimicry in architecture describes the architectural inspiration gleaned from the Venus' Flower Basket structure, notably in connection with Norman Foster's design for Gherkin tower in London.
