= Spongocoel =

Central cavity of sponges

A spongocoel (/ˈspɒŋɡoʊˌsiːl/), also called paragaster (or paragastric cavity), is the large, central cavity of sponges. Water enters the spongocoel through hundreds of tiny pores (ostia) and exits through the larger opening (osculum). Depending on the body plan of the sponge (which can be asconoid, syconoid, or leuconoid), the spongocoel could be a simple interior space of the sponge or a complexly branched inner structure. Regardless of body plan or class, the spongocoel is lined with choanocytes, which have flagella that push water through the spongocoel, creating a current.

The spongocoel is lined by a variety of cell types, each having a unique function:

- porocytes – line the pores of the sponge and are the structure through which water is taken into the organism
- choanocytes – exhibit flagella that create inward currents of water for the sponge's stationary filter feeding mechanism
- amoebocytes – motile cells that perform various digestive functions within the sponge by transporting and/or storing food and excreting waste.
