= Belliella =

Scientific classification
- Domain: Bacteria
- Kingdom: Pseudomonadati
- Phylum: Bacteroidota
- Class: Cytophagia
- Order: Cytophagales
- Family: Cyclobacteriaceae
- Genus: Belliella; Brettar et al. 2004

Type species
- Belliella baltica

Species
- Belliella aquatica Belliella baltica Belliella buryatensis Belliella kenyensis Belliella marina Belliella pelovolcani

Synonyms
- Bella; Bellia

Genus of bacteria

Belliella is a Gram-negative, aerobic, chemoheterotrophic and non-motile bacterial genus from the family Cyclobacteriaceae.
