= Echinicola =

Scientific classification
- Domain: Bacteria
- Kingdom: Pseudomonadati
- Phylum: Bacteroidota
- Class: Cytophagia
- Order: Cytophagales
- Family: Cyclobacteriaceae
- Genus: Echinicola; Nedashkovskaya et al. 2006

Type species
- Echinicola pacifica

Species
- E. jeungdonensis E. pacifica E. rosea E. sediminis E. vietnamensis

Genus of bacteria

Echinicola is an aerobic and motile bacterial genus from the family of Cyclobacteriaceae.
