= Choanoderm =

Type of cell layer found in sponges

The choanoderm is a type of cell layer composed of flagellated collar cells, or choanocytes, found in sponges. The sponge body is mostly a connective tissue; the mesohyl, over which are applied epithelioid monolayers of cells, the outer pinacoderm and the inner choanoderm.

== Importance ==
Most aspects of sponge biology, including feeding, reproduction, and gas exchange, depend on a low pressure flow of water generated by the flagella of the choanoderm. Three grades of organization, asconoid, syconoid, and leuconoid, reflect the degree of elaboration of the choanoderm layer and mesohyl. In the asconoid plan the interior water space, or atrium, is large and unpartitioned. In the syconoid plan the periphery of the atrium is divided into numerous small flagellated chambers with increased surface area for choanocytes. In leuconoid sponges the atrium is replaced by a proliferation of mesohyl and a complex network of water channels and flagellated chambers.
