= Hyalostylus =

Scientific classification
- Kingdom: Animalia
- Phylum: Porifera
- Class: Hexactinellida
- Order: Lyssacinosida
- Family: Euplectellidae
- Genus: Hyalostylus; Schulze, 1886

Genus of sponges

Hyalostylus is a genus of sponges belonging to the family Euplectellidae.

The species of this genus are found in Pacific Ocean.

Species:

- Hyalostylus dives Schulze, 1886
- Hyalostylus microfloricomus Kersken, Janussen & Martínez Arbizu, 2019
- Hyalostylus monomicrosclerus Tabachnick & Lévi, 2004
- Hyalostylus schulzei Kersken, Janussen & Martínez Arbizu, 2019
