= Aquiflexum =

Scientific classification
- Domain: Bacteria
- Kingdom: Pseudomonadati
- Phylum: Bacteroidota
- Class: Cytophagia
- Order: Cytophagales
- Family: Cyclobacteriaceae
- Genus: Aquiflexum; Brettar et al. 2004

Type species
- Aquiflexum balticum

Species
- A. balticum

Genus of bacteria

Aquiflexum is a Gram-negative, aerobic, heterotrophic and non-motile bacterial genus from the family of Cyclobacteriaceae with one known species (Aquiflexum balticum).
