= Corbitella elegans =

Scientific classification
- Kingdom: Animalia
- Phylum: Porifera
- Class: Hexactinellida
- Order: Lyssacinosida
- Family: Euplectellidae
- Genus: Corbitella
- Species: C. elegans

Binomial name
- Corbitella elegans (Marshall, 1875)

Synonyms
- Eudictyon elegans Marshall, 1875; Eudictyum elegans Marshall, 1875

Species of sponge

Corbitella elegans is a species of glass sponges (Hexactinellids) belonging to the family Euplectellidae. It is found in the Banda Sea in the Maluku Islands of Indonesia.

The type specimen is number ZMA 01039, found in Indonesia (Maluku).
