= Euphorbia elegans =

Scientific classification
- Kingdom: Plantae
- Clade: Tracheophytes
- Clade: Angiosperms
- Clade: Eudicots
- Clade: Rosids
- Order: Malpighiales
- Family: Euphorbiaceae
- Genus: Euphorbia
- Species: E. elegans

Binomial name
- Euphorbia elegans Spreng., 1826

Varieties
- Euphorbia elegans var. laxa Boiss. 1862

Synonyms
- Chamaesyce elegans (Spreng.) Soják, 1972

Species of flowering plant

Euphorbia elegans is a species of plant in the family Euphorbiaceae.
