= Algoriphagus =

Scientific classification
- Domain: Bacteria
- Kingdom: Pseudomonadati
- Phylum: Bacteroidota
- Class: Cytophagia
- Order: Cytophagales
- Family: Cyclobacteriaceae
- Genus: Algoriphagus; Bowman et al. 2003 emend. Nedashkovskaya et al. 2007.

Type species
- Algoriphagus ratkowskyi Bowman et al. 2003

Genus of bacteria

Algoriphagus is a genus of gram-negative bacteria in the phylum Bacteroidota (Bacteria).

== Etymology ==
The name Algoriphagus derives from:
Latin masculine gender noun algor -oris, cold; Greek masculine gender noun phagos, glutton; Neo-Latin masculine gender noun Algoriphagus, the cold eater.

== Species ==
The genus contains 46 validly described species as of 2020 as indicated in the List of Names with Standing in Prokaryote Nomenclature (LPSN.dmz.de). Some of these species are listed below

- A. alkaliphilus ( (Tiago et al. 2006) Nedashkovskaya et al. 2007; Neo-Latin noun alkali (from Arabic article al, the; Arabic noun qaliy, ashes of saltwort, soda), alkali; Neo-Latin adjective philus from Greek adjective philos (φίλος) meaning friend, loving; Neo-Latin feminine gender adjective alkaliphila, loving alkaline environments.)
- A. antarcticus (Van Trappen et al. 2004; Latin masculine gender adjective antarcticus, southern, of the Antarctic, the environment from where the strains were isolated.)
- A. aquatilis (Liu et al. 2009; Latin masculine gender adjective aquatilis, aquatic, pertaining to the isolation of the type strain from fresh water.)
- A. aquimarinus ( Nedashkovskaya et al. 2004; Latin feminine gender noun aqua, water; Latin masculine gender adjective marinus, marine, of the sea; Neo-Latin masculine gender adjective aquimarinus, of sea water.)
- A. boritolerans ((Ahmed et al. 2007) Nedashkovskaya et al. 2007; Neo-Latin noun borum, boron; Latin participle adjective tolerans, tolerating; Neo-Latin participle adjective boritolerans, boron-tolerating.)
- A. chordae (Nedashkovskaya et al. 2004; Neo-Latin genitive case noun chordae, of Chorda, the generic name of the brown alga Chorda filum, from which the type strain was isolated.)
- A. halophilus ((Yi and Chun 2004) Nedashkovskaya et al. 2004; Greek noun hals, halos (ἅλς, ἁλός), salt; Neo-Latin adjective philus from Greek adjective philos (φίλος) meaning friend, loving; Neo-Latin masculine gender adjective halophilus, salt-loving.)
- A. hitonicola (Copa-Patiño et al. 2008; Neo-Latin noun hito, El Hito lagoon; Latin suff. -cola, inhabitant, dweller; Neo-Latin noun hitonicola, inhabitant of El Hito.)
- A. locisalis (Yoon et al. 2005; Latin noun locus, place, locality; Latin genitive case noun salis, of salt; Neo-Latin genitive case noun locisalis, of a place of salt.)
- A. lutimaris (Park et al. 2010; Latin noun lutum, mud; Latin genitive case noun maris, of the sea; Neo-Latin genitive case noun lutimaris, of a marine mud.)
- A. machipongonensis (Alegado et al. 2012; Algonquin noun "Machipongo", Hog Island, Virginia, USA; Latin suff. -ensis, of or belonging to; Neo-Latin masculine gender "machipongonensis", of or belonging to Machipongo/Hog Island). It was found that it produces a bacterial sulfonolipid, called rosette inducing factor (RIF-1) which triggers colony formation in Salpingoeca rosetta
- A. mannitolivorans ((Yi and Chun 2004) Nedashkovskaya et al. 2007; Neo-Latin neuter gender noun mannitolum, mannitol; Latin participle adjective vorans, devouring; Neo-Latin participle adjective mannitolivorans, mannitol-devouring, utilizing mannitol.)
- A. marincola ((Yoon et al. 2004) Nedashkovskaya et al. 2007; Latin noun mare -is, the sea; Latin noun incola, inhabitant; Neo-Latin noun marincola, inhabitant of the sea.)
- A. olei (Young et al. 2009; Latin genitive case neuter gender noun olei, of/from oil, as the type strain was isolated from oil-contaminated soil.)
- A. ornithinivorans ((Yi and Chun 2004) Nedashkovskaya et al. 2007; Neo-Latin neuter gender noun ornithinum, ornithine; Latin participle adjective vorans, devouring; Neo-Latin participle adjective ornithinivorans, ornithine-devouring, utilizing ornithine.)
- A. ratkowskyi (Bowman et al. 2003, (Type species of the genus).; Neo-Latin genitive case masculine gender noun ratkowskyi, of Ratkowsky, in honour of David A. Ratkowsky, who made significant contributions to growth-modelling of bacteria, including psychrophilic bacteria.)
- A. terrigena (Yoon et al. 2006; Latin masculine gender or feminine gender noun terrigena, child of the earth, referring to the isolation of the type strain from soil.)
- A. vanfongensis (Nedashkovskaya et al. 2007; Neo-Latin masculine gender adjective vanfongensis, of or pertaining to Vanfong Bay, from which the type strain was isolated.)
- A. winogradskyi (Nedashkovskaya et al. 2004; Neo-Latin genitive case masculine gender noun winogradskyi, of Winogradsky, to honour Sergey N. Winogradsky, for his contribution to the study of Cytophaga-like bacteria.)
- A. yeomjeoni (Yoon et al. 2005; Neo-Latin noun yeomjeonum, yeomjeon (the Korean name for a marine solar saltern); Neo-Latin genitive case noun yeomjeoni, of a yeomjeon.)
