= Pinacoderm =

Outer cell layer of sponges

The pinacoderm is the outermost layer of body cells (pinacocytes) of organisms of the phylum Porifera (sponges), equivalent to the epidermis in other animals.

== Structure ==
The pinacoderm is composed of pinacocytes, flattened epithelial cells that can expand or contract to slightly alter the size and shape of the sponge. It also contains porocytes, oval-shaped cells extending from the pinacoderm to the choanoderm (the body layer containing choanocytes).
