= Saccocalyx (sponge) =

Scientific classification
- Kingdom: Animalia
- Phylum: Porifera
- Class: Hexactinellida
- Order: Lyssacinosida
- Family: Euplectellidae
- Subfamily: Bolosominae
- Genus: Saccocalyx; Schulze, 1896

Synonyms
- Nubicaulus Reiswig, 1999

Genus of sponges

Saccocalyx is a genus of sponge belonging to the family Euplectellidae.

The species of this genus are found in the Pacific Ocean.

Species:

- Saccocalyx careyi (Reiswig, 1999)
- Saccocalyx microhexactin L.i.Gong & Qiu, 2015
- Saccocalyx pedunculatus Schulze, 1896
- Saccocalyx tetractinus Reiswig & Kelly, 2018
