= Choanocyte =

Type of cells in sponges

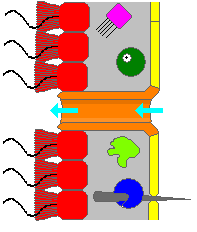
Main cell types of Porifera

Choanocytes (also known as "collar cells") are cells that line the interior of asconoid, syconoid and leuconoid body types of sponges that contain a central flagellum, or cilium, surrounded by a collar of microvilli which are connected by a thin membrane.

They make up the choanoderm, a type of cell layer found in sponges. The cell has the closest resemblance to the choanoflagellates which are the closest related single celled protists to the animal kingdom (metazoans). The flagellae beat regularly, creating a water flow across the microvilli which can then filter nutrients from the water taken from the collar of the sponge. Food particles are then phagocytosed by the cell.

Choanocytes are found dotting the surface of the spongocoel in asconoid sponges and the radial canals in syconoid sponges, but they comprise entirely the chambers in leuconoid sponges.

== Morphology ==
Representation of a choanocyte: 1. Flagellum; 2. Collar; 3. Flagellar vane; 4. Glycocalyx layer; 5. Contractile vacuole, regulates the quantity of water inside a cell; 6. Golgi apparatus; modifies proteins and sends them out of the cell; 7. Mitochondrion, creates ATP (energy) for the cell; 8. Endoplasmic reticulum, the transport network for molecules going to specific parts of the cell; 9. Intercellular junction; 10. Flagellar basal body (centriole); 11. Nucleus; 12. Nucleolus; 13. Electron dense vesicles; 14. Digestive vesicle (with prey); 15. Phagocytic vesicle (with prey); 16. Lysosome, holds enzymes

== Function ==
By cooperatively moving their flagella, choanocytes filter particles out of the water and into the spongocoel, and out through the osculum. This improves both respiratory and digestive functions for the sponge, pulling in oxygen and nutrients and allowing a rapid expulsion of carbon dioxide and other waste products. Although all cells in a sponge are capable of living on their own, choanocytes carry out most of the sponge's ingestion, passing digested materials to the amoebocytes for delivery to other cells.

Choanocytes can also turn into spermatocytes when needed for sexual reproduction, due to the lack of reproductive organs in sponges (amoebocytes become the oocytes).

== Evolutionary significance ==
Choanocytes bear a superficial resemblance to Choanoflagellates. Molecular phylogenies indicate that choanoflagellates and metazoans are sister groups. One can see some modern choanoflagellates living in small colonies. The evolutionary relationship between the two cell types is debated.

== See also ==
- Choanoderm
