= Porocyte =

Tubular cells

Porocytes are tubular cells which make up the pores of a sponge known as ostia.

== Description ==
Covering the sponge is a layer of cells known as the pinacoderm, which is composed of pinacocytes. In a sponge, pinacocytes are a thin, elastic layer which keeps water out. Between the pinacocytes, there are the porocytes that allow water into the sponge. Myocytes are small muscular cells that open and close the porocytes. They also form a circular ring around the osculum and help in closing and opening of it. Once through the pores, water travels down canals. The opening to a porocyte is a pore known as an ostium.

In sponges, like Scypha, there are some cells that have an intracellular pore. These cells are known as porocytes. They are present in the Leucosolenia (an asconoid sponge) in the body wall through which water enters the body or they are present in Scypha (a syconoid sponge) as a connection between incurrent canal and radial canal. The pore is called an ostia in asconoid type sponges as it serves as the connection between the outside of the body and the spongocoel but called a prosopyle in syconoid sponges. They are modified pinacocytes.
