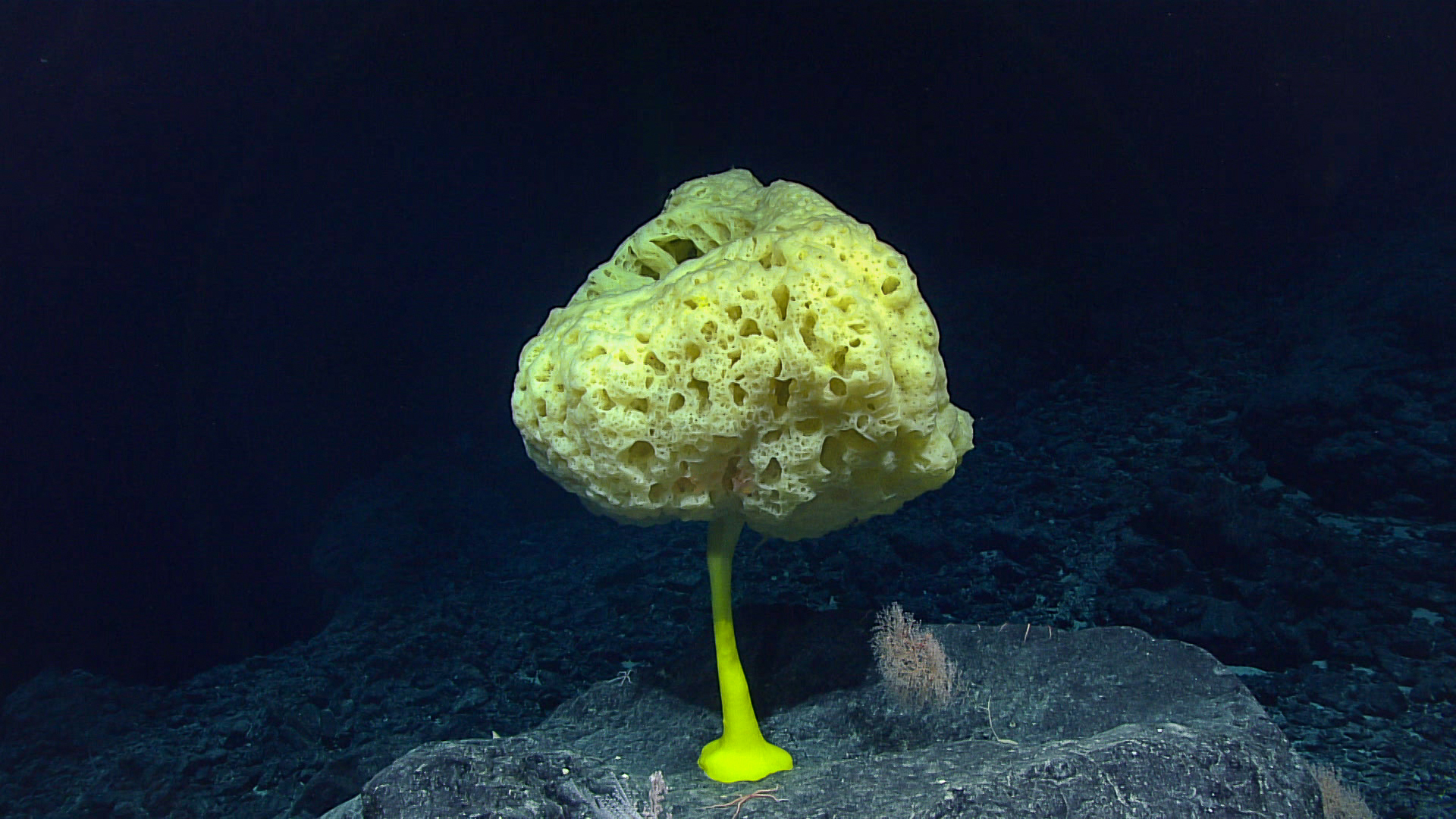
- Bolosoma spp. on Sibelius Seamount

Scientific classification
- Kingdom: Animalia
- Phylum: Porifera
- Class: Hexactinellida
- Order: Lyssacinosida
- Family: Euplectellidae; Ijima, 1904
- Genus: Bolosoma (Ijima, 1904)

Type species
- Bolosoma paradictyum Ijima, 1903

Species
- See text

Synonyms
- Placosoma (Ijima, 1903)

= Bolosoma =

Genus of sponges

Bolosoma is a genus of pedunculated siliceous sponges belonging to the family Euplectellidae. This genus lives in deep-sea environments and provides a habitat for a plethora of other benthic species, giving Bolosoma an incredibly important ecological role in the ecosystems it is a part of.

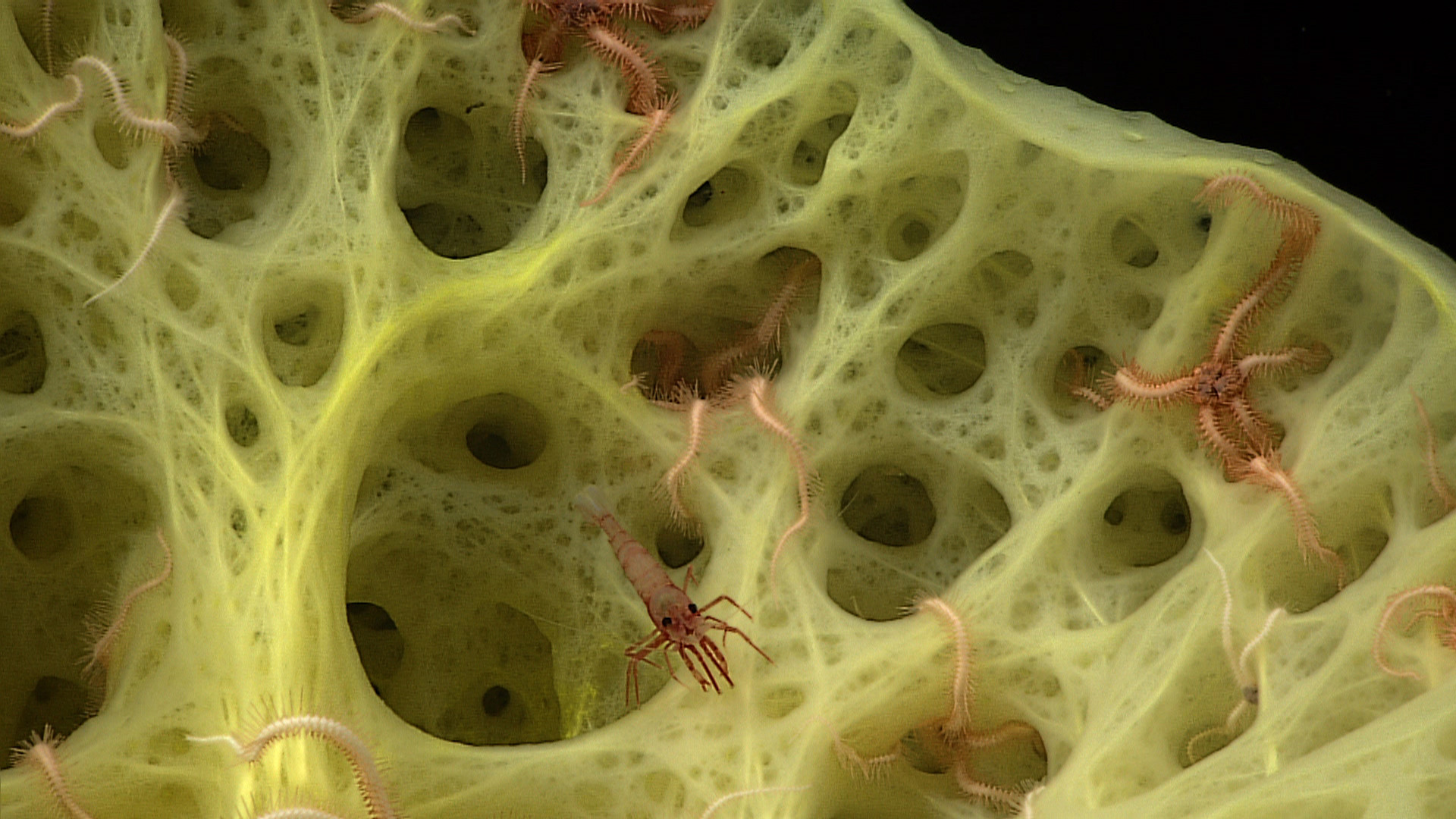
Brittle stars and other deep-sea invertebrates use this Bolosoma species as a habitat

== Species ==
Bolosoma currently contains nine species.

- Bolosoma biocalum Tabachnick & Lévi, 2004
- Bolosoma cavum Ijima, 1927
- Bolosoma charcoti Tabachnick & Lévi, 2004
- Bolosoma cyanae Tabachnick & Lévi, 2004
- Bolosoma meridionale Tabachnick & Lévi, 2004
- Bolosoma musorstomum Tabachnick & Lévi, 2004
- Bolosoma paradictyum (Ijima, 1903)
- Bolosoma perezi Castello-Branco, Collins & Hajdu, 2020
- Bolosoma volsmarum Tabachnick & Lévi, 2004

== Description ==
The body plans of this genus all consist of the main body suspended above the substrate by the peduncle. This main body can exhibit a variety of forms, such as fungiform or vase-like. This genus exhibits the leuconoid form, containing its choanocytes in a series of unlinked chambers.

In terms of their visible-to-the-naked-eye megasclere spicules, all Bolosoma species have two-rayed diactin spicules forming one or more parts of their body structure. For all currently surveyed species, basalia spicules were found to be diactines, with the peduncle being shaped by long diactines. The choanosoma, atrialia, and dermalia spicules of most Bolosoma species consist mainly of diactines, with six-rayed hexactin and five-rayed pentactin spicules also present in lower concentrations. In species with hexactin dermalia the ray of each spicule directed outside of the sponge wall is wider than the other rays. In species with hexactin atrialia the spicule ray facing inward towards the center of the body is wider than the other rays.

The microscopic microsclere spicules of this genus vary greatly by species. Some common microscleres found in Bolosoma species' skeletons are the ball shaped discohexasters and the many-armed branching codonhexasters, the latter of which may have anchor-like structures at the ends of its branches.

== Habitat and distribution ==
The Bolosoma are benthic organisms that live exclusively in the deep sea, preferring hard, rocky substrates such as old lava flows. This genus is found as deep as over 3,700 meters in some parts of the Pacific Ocean. In these environments, Bolosoma species can be the dominant benthic species, being incredibly common in areas such as seamounts. The substrate Bolosoma can grow on varies, with this genus being found on polymetallic nodules and softer surrounding sediments in areas such as the Clarion-Clipperton fracture zone. Of the currently nine identified species in genus Bolosoma, all live exclusively in the Pacific Ocean with the exception of Bolosoma perezi, which can be found in the Rio Grande Rise in the Atlantic Ocean.

== Ecology ==
Siliceous sponges such as Bolosoma are habitat-building species, with many groups such as echinoderms and marine worms living on them. Even when dead, Bolosoma peduncles can provide structure for organisms like ophiuroids. Similar to many other taxa of deep-water suspension feeders, the diet and feeding habits of Bolosoma are relatively unknown due to lack of study. The reproductive dynamics of Bolosoma likewise are relatively unknown.

Due to their habitat-building ecological role, deep-sea siliceous sponges such as Bolosoma have been used as indicator taxa of the stability of the ecosystems they inhabit, especially for vulnerable marine ecosystems on seamounts. By observing how healthy the populations of Hexactinellida sponges like Bolosoma are in commercially important environments such as the Emperor Seamount Chain, scientists can draw conclusions about how best to manage fishing practices in those areas.

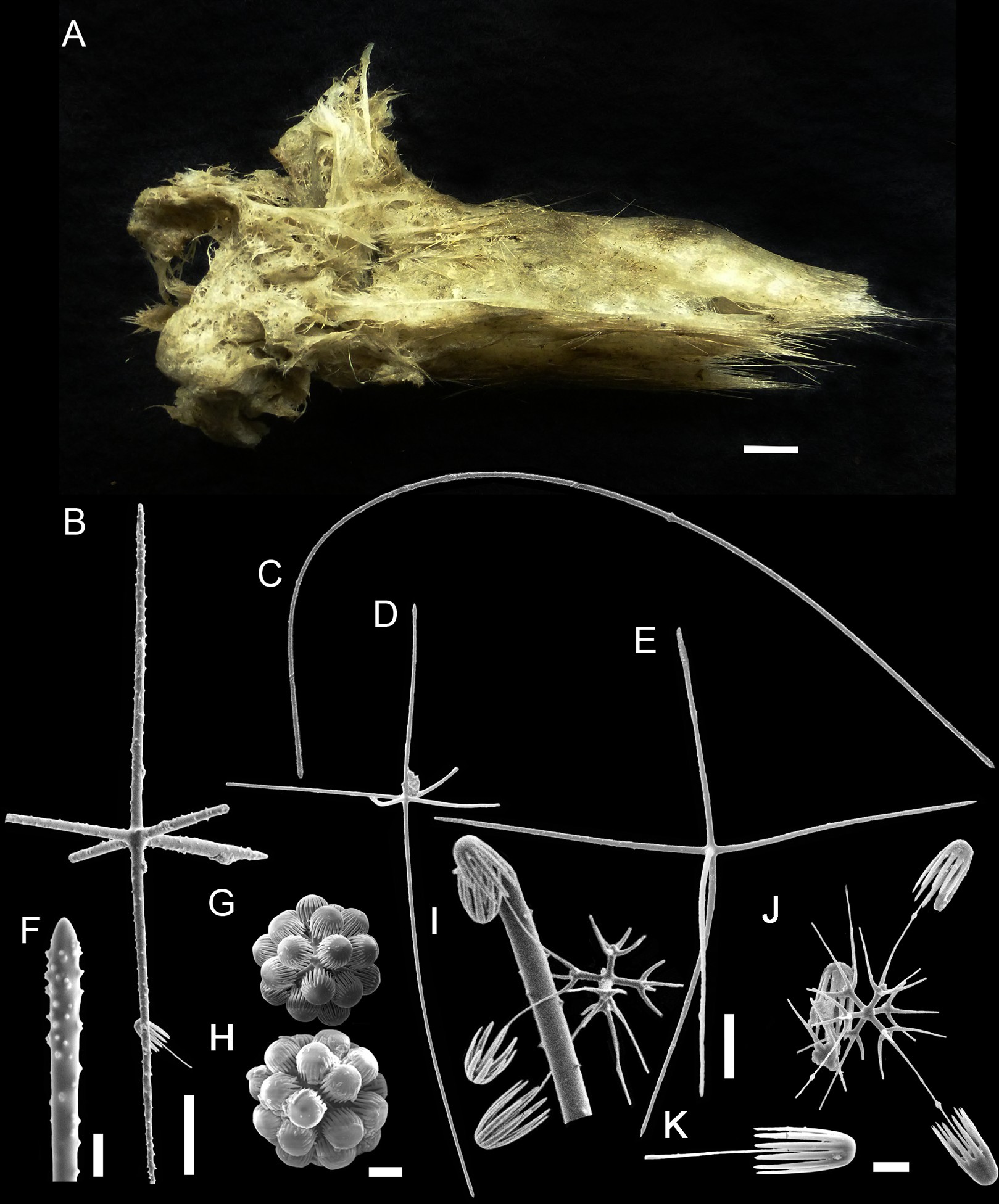
Specimen: AMegascleres: B, D, and E: hexactines, C: diactin, F: close view of a hexactine distal ray, Microscleres:G and H: discohexasters, I and J: codonhexasters, K: anchor-like end of a condonhexaster

== Conservation ==
While the conservation status of Bolosoma has not been thoroughly studied, this genus and similar taxa are threatened by some notable human activities. Siliceous sponge genera such as Bolosoma are commonly found on polymetallic nodules, and future deep-sea mining of those areas represents a serious threat to those genera and species that live on them.

In response to unusually high suspended sediment concentrations in the surrounding water, siliceous sponges will stop actively pumping water, causing them to be unable to access food or expel waste. Trawling can cause highly increased suspended sediment concentrations, which causes nearby siliceous sponges to stop filtering and face adverse health effects.
