= Amebocyte =

Cell type in the circulatory system of invertebrates

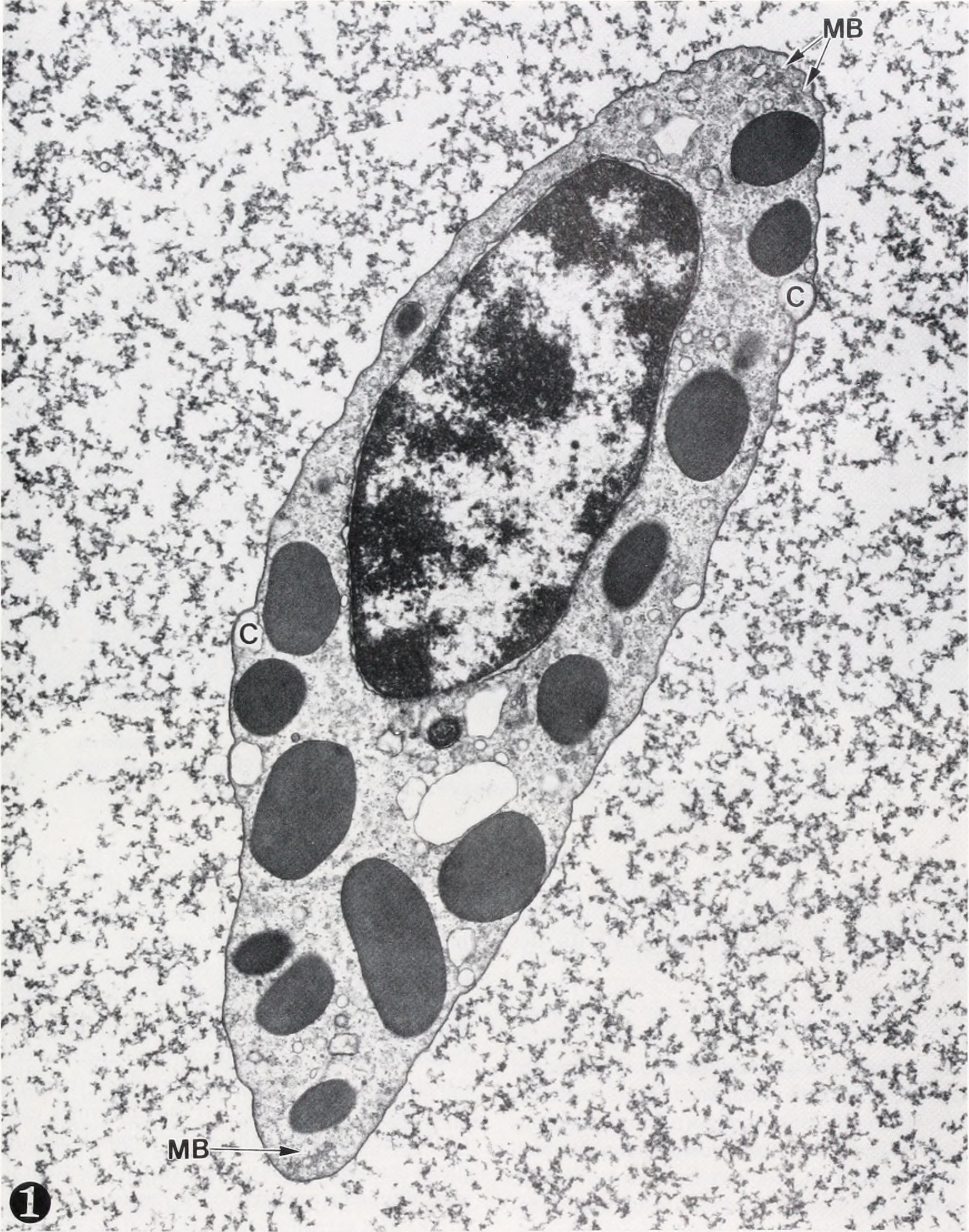
The cytoskeleton of a Limulus (horseshoe crab) amebocyte

An amebocyte or amoebocyte (/əˈmiːbəsaɪt/) is a motile cell (moving like an amoeba) in the bodies of invertebrates including cnidaria, echinoderms, molluscs, tunicates, sponges, and some chelicerates.

Moving by pseudopodia, amebocytes can manifest as blood cells or play a similar biological role.

In older literature, the term amebocyte is sometimes used as a synonym of phagocyte.

== Purpose ==
Similarly to some of the white blood cells of vertebrates, in many species amebocytes are found in the blood or body fluid (e.g. as the blood cells of Limulus, the horseshoe crab) and play a role in the defense of the organism against pathogens. Depending on the species, an amebocyte may also digest and distribute food, dispose of wastes, form skeletal fibers, fight infections, and change into other cell types.

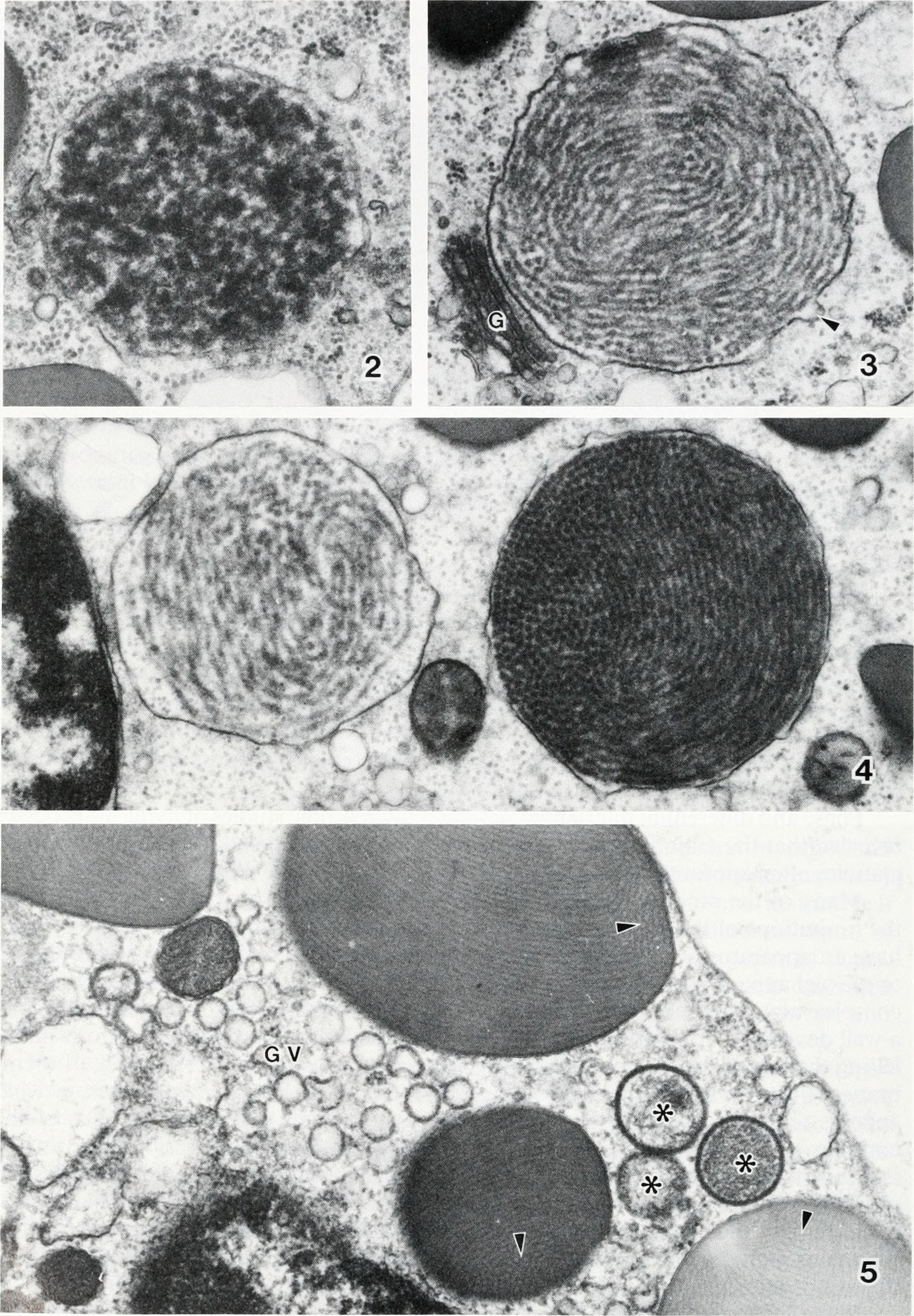
Immature Limulus granules

== Examples ==
In sponges, amebocytes, also known as archaeocytes, are cells found in the mesohyl that can transform into any of the animal's more specialized cell types.

In tunicates they are blood cells and use pseudopodia to attack pathogens that enter the blood, transport nutrients, get rid of waste products, and grow/repair the tunica.

The amebocytes of Limulus are characterized by large granules around the nucleus, ribosome-like particles in the cytoplasm, and a circumferential ring of microtubules, which likely help maintain the cells' prolate-to-fusiform shape.

== Uses ==
Limulus amebocyte lysate, an aqueous extract of amebocytes from the Atlantic horseshoe crab (Limulus polyphemus), is commonly used in a test to detect bacterial endotoxins.
