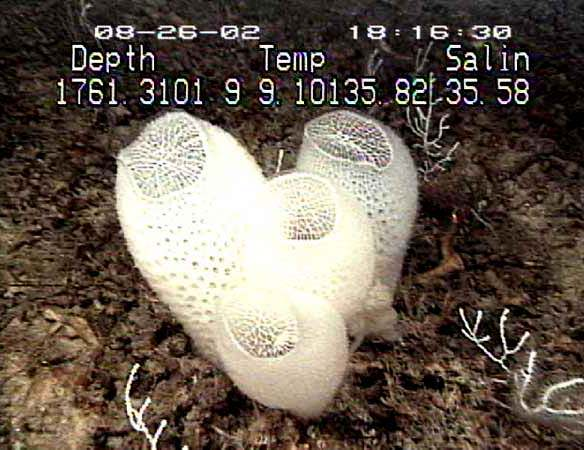
- Venus Flower Basket (Euplectella aspergillum)

Scientific classification
- Kingdom: Animalia
- Phylum: Porifera
- Class: Hexactinellida
- Order: Lyssacinosida
- Family: Euplectellidae; Gray, 1867

Subfamilies
- Bolosominae Tabachnick, 2002; Corbitellinae Gray, 1872; Euplectellinae Gray, 1867

= Euplectellidae =

Euplectellidae Temporal range: 444 – 0 Ma

Family of sponges

Euplectellidae is a family of glass sponges (Hexactinellids) belonging to the order Lyssacinosa, first represented in the Ordovician fossil record, substantially older than molecular estimates of the clade's age.

== Taxonomies ==
According to the World Register of Marine Species (WoRMS) the family includes the following subfamilies and genera:
Subfamily Bolosominae Tabachnick, 2002

- Advhena Castello-Branco, Collins & Hajdu, 2020
- Amphidiscella Tabachnick & Lévi, 1997
- Amphoreus Reiswig & Kelly, 2018
- Bolosoma Ijima, 1904
- Caulocalyx Schulze, 1886
- Hyalostylus Schulze, 1886
- Neocaledoniella Tabachnick & Lévi, 2004
- Rhizophyta Shen, Dohrmann, Zhang, Lu & Wang, 2019
- Saccocalyx Schulze, 1896
- Trachycaulus Schulze, 1886
- Trychella Reiswig & Kelly, 2018
- Vityaziella Tabachnick & Lévi, 1997

Subfamily Corbitellinae Gray, 1872

- Atlantisella Tabachnick, 2002
- Corbitella Gray, 1867
- Dictyaulus Schulze, 1896
- Dictyocalyx Schulze, 1886
- Hertwigia Schmidt, 1880
- Heterotella Gray, 1867
- Ijimaiella Tabachnick, 2002
- Plumicoma Reiswig & Kelly, 2018
- Pseudoplectella Tabachnick, 1990
- Regadrella Schmidt, 1880
- Rhabdopectella Schmidt, 1880
- Walteria Schulze, 1886

Subfamily Euplectellinae Gray, 1867

- Acoelocalyx Topsent, 1910
- Chaunangium Schulze, 1904
- Docosaccus Topsent, 1910
- Euplectella Owen, 1841
- Holascus Schulze, 1886
- Malacosaccus Schulze, 1886
- Placopegma Schulze, 1895
