= Cyclobacteriaceae =

Scientific classification
- Domain: Bacteria
- Kingdom: Pseudomonadati
- Phylum: Bacteroidota
- Class: Cytophagia
- Order: Cytophagales
- Family: Cyclobacteriaceae; Nedashkovskaya and Ludwig 2012

Genera
- Algoriphagus Bowman et al. 2003; Anditalea Shi et al. 2012; Aquiflexum Brettar et al. 2004; Arthrospiribacter Waleron et al. 2020; Belliella Brettar et al. 2004; Cecembia Anil Kumar et al. 2012; Cyclobacterium Raj and Maloy 1990; Echinicola Nedashkovskaya et al. 2006; Fontibacter Kämpfer et al. 2010; Indibacter Anil Kumar et al. 2010; Lunatibacter Han et al. 2021; Lunatimonas Srinivas et al. 2015; Mariniradius Bhumika et al. 2013; Mongoliibacter Wang et al. 2016; Mongoliicoccus Liu et al. 2012; Mongoliitalea Yang et al. 2012; Negadavirga Hu et al. 2015; Nitritalea Anil Kumar et al. 2010; Pleomorphovibrio Song et al. 2019; Rhodonellum Schmidt et al. 2006; Shivajiella Anil Kumar et al. 2013

Family of bacteria

Cyclobacteriaceae is a family of bacteria in the phylum Bacteroidota.
