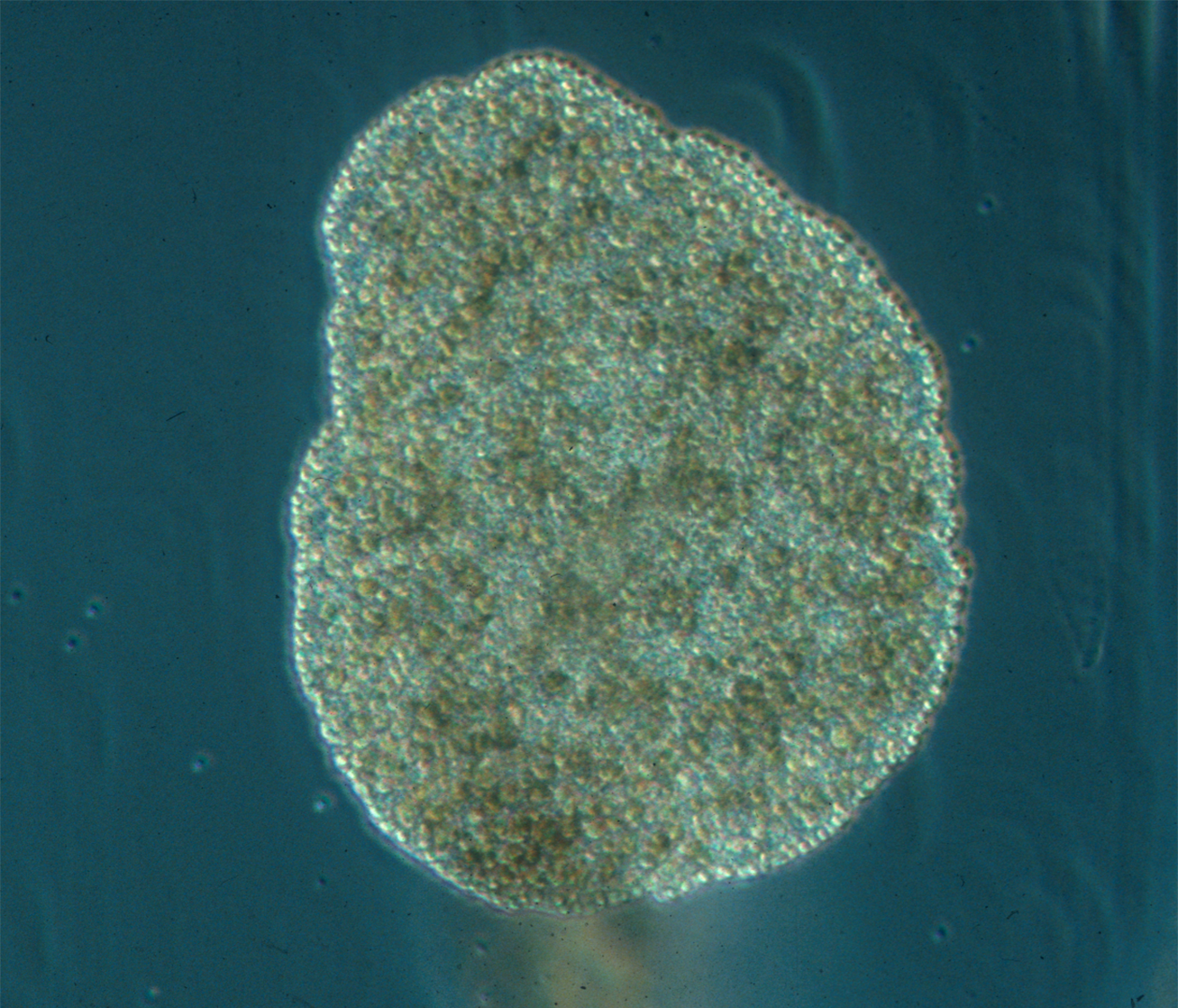
- Trichoplax adhaerens

Scientific classification
- Kingdom: Animalia
- Phylum: Placozoa
- Class: Uniplacotomia; Tessler et al., 2022

Type species
- Trichoplax adhaerens Schulze, 1883

Orders
- Order Trichoplacea; Family Trichoplacidae; Trichoplax; Order Cladhexea; Undescribed species; Order Hoilungea; Family Cladtertiidae; Cladtertia; Family Hoilungidae; Hoilungia

= Uniplacotomia =

Class of Placozoa

Uniplacotomia is a class of placozoans encompassing the vast majority of the phylum, with the exception of Polyplacotoma. It was established in 2022. It comprises the orders Trichoplacea, Cladhexea and Hoilungea. Their morphology is consistent across the class, resembling the typical Trichoplax as mostly rounded, flat organisms rather than the polytomous, branching structure exhibited by Polyplacotomia.

Despite a uniform exterior morphology, Uniplacotomia exhibits an important degree of diversity in molecular morphology, with at least two dozen species estimated to exist.
