= Grell =

Grell may refer to:

== People with the surname ==
- Eduard Grell (1800–1886), German composer, organist, and music teacher
- Glen Grell (born 1956), Republican member of the Pennsylvania House of Representatives
- H. J. Grell (1866–?), American politician
- Karl Gottlieb Grell (1912–1994), German zoologist and protistologist
- Mervyn Grell (1899–1976), Trinidadian cricketer
- Mike Grell (born 1947), American comic book writer and artist
- Miranda Grell (born 1978), English Labour party politician found guilty of making false statements against her political opponent

== Other ==
- Grell (Dungeons & Dragons), a creature in the role-playing game Dungeons & Dragons
- Grell Sutcliff, a character in the manga and anime series Black Butler
- "The Grell", an episode of The Outer Limits
