= London Hughes =

British comedian

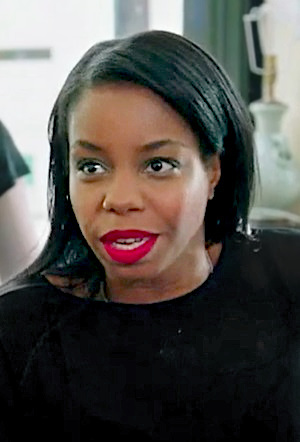
- Hughes in 2015
- Born: London Dionne Micha Stacey Stephanie Estina Knibbs-Hughes; 7 June 1989 (age 37); Thornton Heath, London, England

Comedy career
- Years active: 2010–present
- Medium: Television

London Hughes (born 7 June 1989) is a British comedian, television writer and presenter. She wrote and starred in Laughter Shock, a comedy for the BBC which piloted in 2010.

== Early life ==
London Dionne Micha Stacey Stephanie Estina Knibbs-Hughes was born in Thornton Heath, South London in England. Her mother is of Jamaican and Cuban ancestry, while her father is of Puerto Rican, Spanish and Nigerian ancestry. Her great grandfather was Enos Knibbs, a cricket umpire. When she was younger, she spent most of her spare time working on new routines with a dance crew. Her family moved to Brighton when she was aged 14.

== Career ==
Hughes started her television career presenting daytime shows on adult TV station Babestation, before moving on to presenting the morning show for CBBC for almost two years. In that time she also presented live links on BBC One and BBC Two and made regular appearances on Blue Peter and had a presenter role in children's show All Over the Place alongside Ed Petrie as well as voicing characters for CBBC's comedy, Big Babies. As a comedian, she initially used the stage name "Miss London", changing it to "Miss London Hughes" and eventually to "London Hughes" to avoid confusion with the regional beauty pageant Miss London.

Hughes won the 2009 Funny Women Award at the Comedy Store (London), against competition from Eve Webster and Jo Selby. She has appeared on children's television such as Series 1–5 of CITV's weekend breakfast show, Scrambled! Pre-recorded, Scrambled! is a mixture of chat, games and comedy sketches with the presenters interlinking between shows in the CITV schedule. Hughes departed the show in 2018, and the series proper came to an end in 2021, after 7 years.

Hughes had her first feature film role in comedy It's a Lot, written and directed by Femi Oyeniran, released nationwide in 2013. London improvised a lot of the comedy material for her scenes and choreographed the numerous dance routines used throughout the film.

Hughes made her BBC Radio 4 debut in August 2013 by writing and starring in her own sitcom pilot named 28 Dates Later. Loosely based on her life, the sitcom was about two girls that work in a cinema with a love of romantic comedies, but can't seem to make their own love lives match up to the ones in the movies. She has also featured in comedy entertainment show Life: An Idiot's Guide and satirical sketch show Newsjack, both for BBC Radio 4.

In 2016, she appeared as a sex shop worker in an episode of the first season of Fleabag.

Hughes launched her own YouTube comedy series No Filter in 2016, written by and starring herself based on her real-life experiences in friendship and dating.

Hughes has also featured on the Drunk Women Solving Crime podcast with writer/comedian hosts Hannah George, Catie Wilkins and Taylor Glenn, as well as on Richard Herring's Leicester Square Theatre Podcast, RHLSTP.

She was a contestant on ITV's All Star Musical 2019 and also appeared on The Stand Up Sketch Show on ITV2 and BBC Two's Mock the Week.

In 2018, Hughes was working on developing a comedian travel show that would feature herself and Whoopi Goldberg. However, despite Goldberg having agreed to do the show, no TV channel was interested and the show did not get made.

Hughes' first Edinburgh Festival Fringe show was London Hughes: Superstar (it's just nobody's realised it), in 2017. In 2019, she performed London Hughes: To Catch a D*ck to critical acclaim, becoming the first black nominee in the Edinburgh Comedy Award for Best Comedy Show. The routine was adapted into a 2020 Netflix special.

Hughes is scheduled to star in an upcoming Perfect Strangers reboot for HBO Max alongside Robin Thede.

== Filmography ==
Year	Title	Role
2014	Space Ark	Candy
2014–2018	Scrambled!	Presenter
2015	I Live with Models	Beautician
2015	Venus vs. Mars	Tamara
2016	Fleabag	Sex Shop Worker
2016–2018	Damned	Phone Caller
2017	Celebs Go Dating	Regular (as herself)
2017	The Rebel	Bank Customer Advisor
2019	All Star Musical	Contestant (as herself)
2019	Mock the Week	Guest (as herself)
2019	The Stand Up Sketch Show	Guest (as herself)
2020	London Hughes: To Catch a D*ck	Herself
2020	The Netflix Afterparty	Regular Guest
2021	History of Swear Words	Herself
2021	The Last Leg	Guest (as herself)
2021–2022	To Tell the Truth	Herself
2022	The Russell Howard Hour	Herself
2023	Alan Davies: As Yet Untitled	Guest (as herself)
2023	Sumotherhood	Rowanda
2025	Bat-Fam	Alicia Pennyworth (voice)
