= Maculicorpus =

Maculicorpus Temporal range: Middle Triassic

Scientific classification
- Kingdom: Animalia
- Phylum: Placozoa
- Genus: †Maculicorpus; Knaust, 2021
- Species: †M. microbialis

Binomial name
- †Maculicorpus microbialis Knaust, 2021

Extinct genus of placozoan

Maculicorpus is a fossil genus, potentially a placozoan, from the Middle Triassic of Germany. If its identity is correct, it is the only placozoan known from the fossil record. It comprises a single known species, Maculicorpus microbialis.

== Discovery ==
Maculicorpus is known from a microbialite bed discovered in the Troistedt Quarry near Weimar, as part of the Meißner Formation. The microbialite has been dated to the late Anisian to early Ladinian.

== Description ==
The specimens referred to Maculicorpus appear as flat patches, brown to ochre in color, varying between 1 mm (0.04 in) and 5 mm (0.20 in) in diameter. The outline is irregular and varies in overall shape from circular to elongate, fan-shaped or multi-lobed. The holotype, 4.5 mm (0.18 in) in length, is constricted in the middle, appearing as an aggregate of a larger, irregularly rounded portion and a smaller elliptical one. Maculicorpus is larger than any modern-day placozoan.

== Classification ==
A study on the taphonomy of a modern-day placozoan, Trichoplax, cast uncertainty on the placozoan affinity of Maculicorpus due to the fact that placozoans appear to disintegrate into their component cells upon death in a manner inconsistent with the observed preservation of Maculicorpus. It was stressed more evidence for placozoan affinity is necessary, and that if the genus is a placozoan it must have been unlike modern forms in certain ways.
