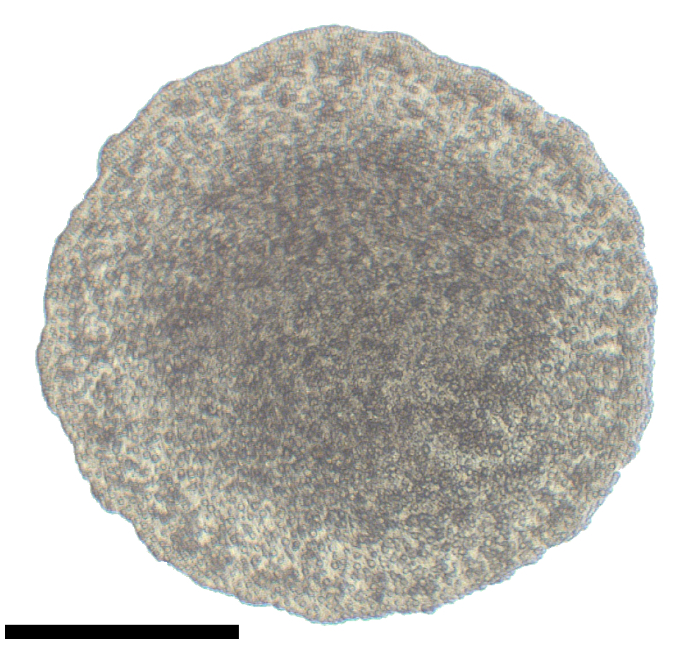
- Microscopic image of Hoilungia hongkongensis. Scale bar is 0.2 mm.

Scientific classification
- Kingdom: Animalia
- Phylum: Placozoa
- Class: Uniplacotomia
- Order: Hoilungea
- Family: Hoilungidae; Tessler et al., 2022

Genera
- Hoilungia

= Hoilungidae =

Family of placozoans

Hoilungidae is a placozoan family comprising Hoilungia and other currently undescribed taxa. Named in 2022, it is believed to be sister to Cladtertiidae, and corresponds to Clades IV, V and VII. Previous studies established these clades on the basis of phylogenomic data. Genus Hoilungia encompasses members of Clade V, while Clades IV and VII have not been formally described as genera. The latter two are believed to encompass multiple species each, although the 2022 study establishing the structure of the family only mapped a single lineage of each. Previously, a wider definition of Hoilungia included all three clades, as well as clades III and VI. The latter two have since been assigned to Cladtertiidae and Cladhexea respectively.

== Phylogeny ==
The following phylogeny follows Eitel et al., 2024, and is based on complete mitochondrial genomes.

- Hoilungidae
  - - Clade IV
      H19
  - - Hoilungia (Clade V)
      - - H4
        - H26
      - - H9
        - Hoilungia hongkongensis (H13)
        - H15
    - Clade VII
      - - H24
        - H27
      - H28
