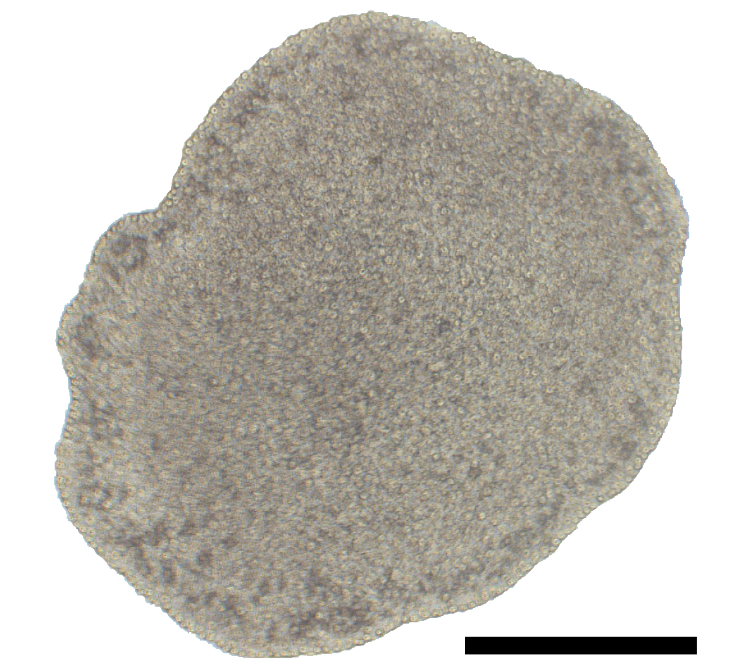
- Microscopic image of Cladtertia collaboinventa. Scale bar is 0.2 mm.

Scientific classification
- Kingdom: Animalia
- Phylum: Placozoa
- Class: Uniplacotomia
- Order: Hoilungea
- Family: Cladtertiidae; Tessler et al., 2022
- Genus: Cladtertia; Tessler et al., 2022

Type species
- Cladtertia collaboinventa Tessler et al., 2022

Other haplotypes
- Cladtertia H6; Cladtertia H7; Cladtertia H8; Cladtertia H16

= Cladtertia =

Genus of placozoans

Cladtertia is a genus of placozoan discovered in 2022. The genus contains a single described species, Cladtertia collaboinventa, although several other undescribed lineages are known. Its closest described relative is Hoilungia hongkongensis, with whom it forms the order Hoilungea.

Cladtertia is similar in morphology to most other placozoans, but genetically distinct from them. It has been found in warm tropical waters with low seasonal changes, ranging from 26°N to 25°S, where it occupies a distinct ecological niche compared to other placozoan lineages. Sexual reproduction through cross-fertilization has been observed in a strain of Cladtertia.

== Etymology ==
The genus name comes from Ancient Greek kládos (clade) and Latin tertius (the third), referring to its specimens previously being assigned to placozoan Clade III in literature.

== Biology ==
Cladtertia is morphologically indistinguishable under light microscopy from other placozoans in the class Uniplacotomia. All of them possess an amoeboid body with little branching, and have been described as "miniature pancakes". However, Cladtertia is distinguished from its relatives at the genetic level. It possesses 27 cell types, compared to 28 and 32 for Trichoplax adhaerens and Hoilungia hongkongensis respectively.

Sexual reproduction has been reported to occur in the placozoan clade identified with strain H8, which was later found to belong to genus Cladtertia. Intergenic recombination was inferred, with some individuals having identical genotypes on one locus but being highly dissimilar on other loci. This can not be achieved with asexual reproduction alone, which requires a complete linkage between regions of the genome. The sharing of alleles between heterozygous and homozygous individuals was also observed, a phenomenon resulting from the combination of gametes during sexual reproduction. A self-fertilization mating system was also excluded by the presence of both heterozygous and homozygous individuals.

== Taxonomy ==
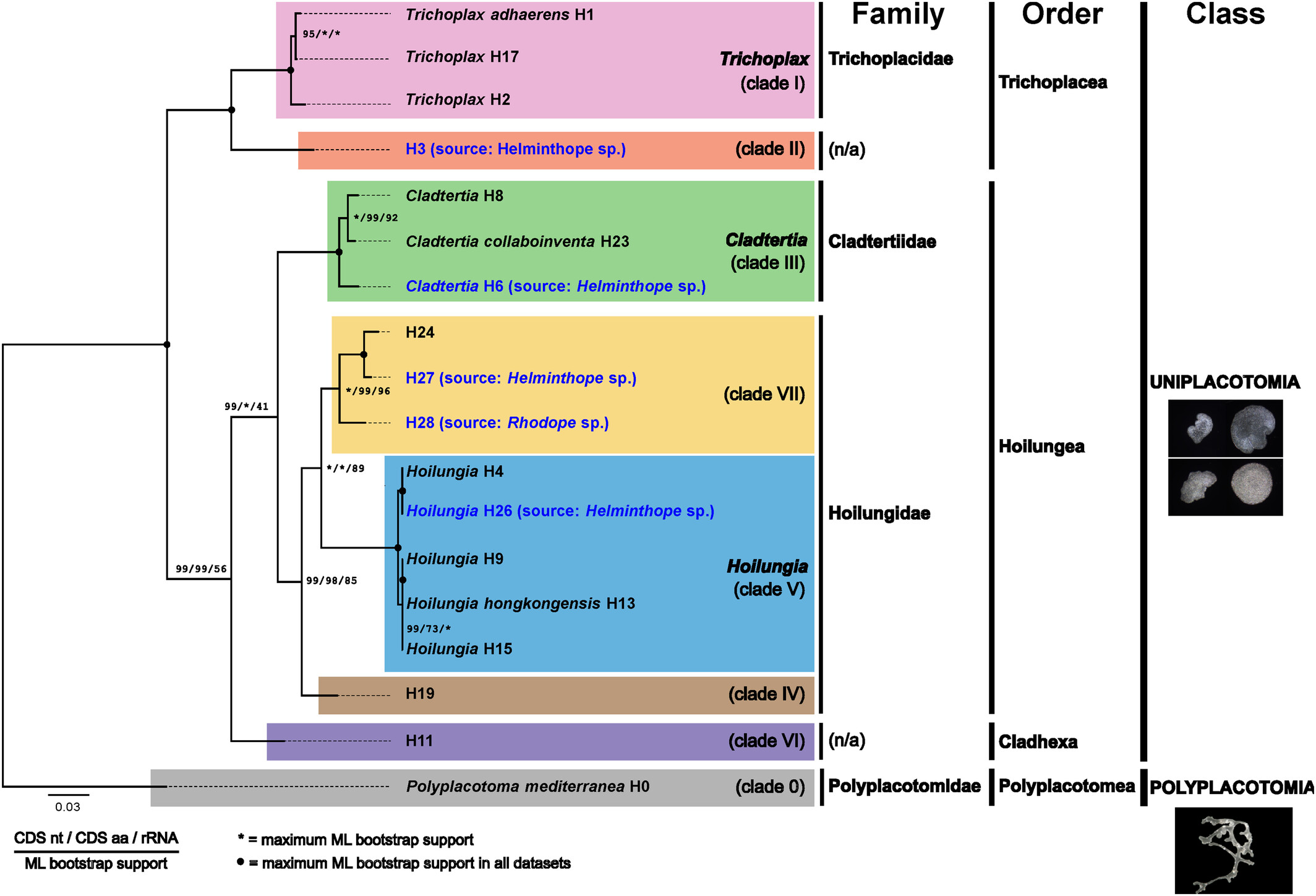
Cladogram of placozoan lineages based on complete mitogenome data. Cladtertia is highlighted in green.

Placozoans were first divided in five clades in 2004 based on their 16S mitochondrial genome. Clade III was later included in the genus Hoilungia.

In 2022, as part of a wider formalization of placozoan taxonomy, Cladtertia was erected to encompass lineages previously placed in Clade III, with Cladtertia collaboinventa as its type species. It is the only described genus in the family Cladtertiidae, which is sister to Hoilungidae in the order Hoilungea. Cladtertiidae is distinguished by 3 uniquely present and 8 uniquely missing genes.

The exact number of species in placozoan genera is uncertain, as it is not known whether all haplotypes correspond to distinct species. Only one species of Cladtertia, C. collaboinventa (formerly haplotype H23), has been formally described, in 2022. Haplotype H6 was confirmed as a distinct species, although it was left undescribed due to a lack of material from which to designate a type specimen. Other haplotypes are known, such as Cladtertia H7, H8 and H16. In a 2024 study, H6 was found to occupy a basal position in the genus compared to C. collaboinventa and H8, with the latter two sharing an inversion of the tRNA-Thr and tRNA-Lys region as a structural synapomorphy.

== Ecology and habitat ==
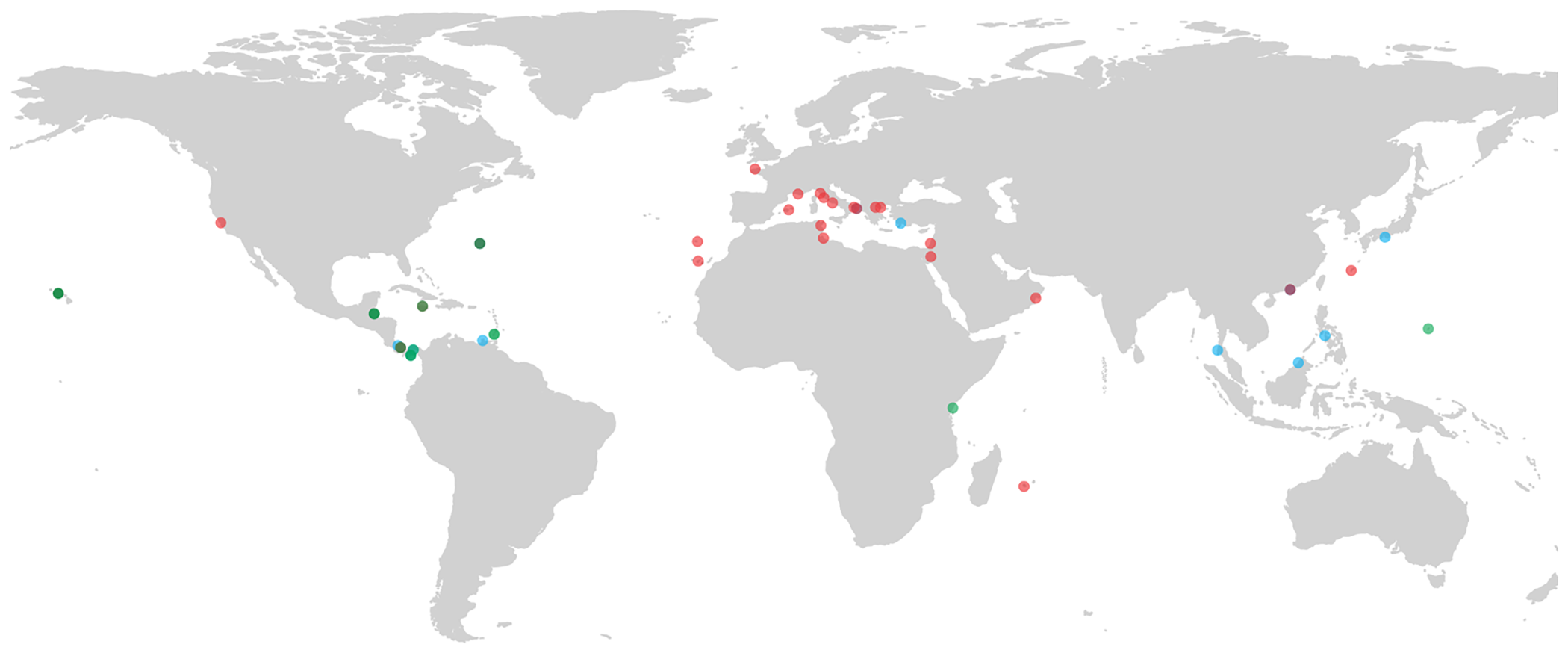
Range map of placozoan clades I, III and V as of 2015. Clade III (Cladtertia) is shown in green.

Compared to other placozoan lineages, Cladtertia is only known from a restricted range of latitudes, from 26°N to 25°S, and has been sampled in the Pacific, Atlantic and Indian Oceans. A 2015 study found that Cladtertia's ecological niche differed from that of Clades I and V, and that surface temperature played a major role in predicted habitat suitability, with Cladtertia preferring warm tropical waters. It is believed to prefer habitats with low seasonal changes, evidenced by a lack of observations in the Mediterranean Sea as of 2013.

Cladtertia H6 was first discovered in Honolulu, Hawaii, where specimens were collected from water tables at the Kewalo Marine Laboratory. The type specimen of C. collaboinventa was found in a sea water aquarium in Germany, and its actual geographical origin is unknown.

Mitochondrial genomes of Cladtertia H6, alongside other placozoans, have been found in the rhodopid sea slug Helminthope sp. in marine sediment near Isla Iguana, Panama, providing evidence of predation by the latter on Cladtertia.
