= London Hughes: To Catch a D*ck =

Stand-up routine

- Written by: London Hughes
- Directed by: Kristian Mercado
- Starring: London Hughes
- Country of origin: United States
- Original language: English

Production
- Producer: Kevin Hart
- Cinematography: Santiago Gonzalez
- Editor: Wes Smith
- Running time: 68 minutes
- Production company: Universal Studios Hollywood

Original release
- Network: Netflix
- Release: December 22, 2020

London Hughes: To Catch a D*ck is a stand-up routine by the British comedian London Hughes. Largely about sex, Hughes recounts stories about her mother and grandmother having children at a young age, her career as an adult chat host and then a children's presenter, and her sexual experiences.

The show received critical acclaim at the 2019 Edinburgh Festival Fringe, with reviewers praising her energy, the humour in her stories, and commentary on gender roles and race. For her performance, Hughes became the first black nominee in the Edinburgh Comedy Award for Best Comedy Show. The routine was subsequently filmed as a Netflix special, with Kevin Hart serving as producer; Hughes moved from the U.K. to Los Angeles to film the special. It was delayed due to the COVID-19 pandemic and released on 22 December 2020.

== History ==
London Hughes is a stand-up comedian and television presenter, born in 1989 in Thornton Heath, London. She first performed To Catch a D*ck at The Pleasance in July and August 2019 as part of the Edinburgh Festival Fringe. It was her second show at the Fringe after London Hughes: Superstar (it's just nobody's realised it) (2017). The full run at the Fringe sold out, and she then performed the routine at the Soho Theatre in December 2019 and at the Bloomsbury Theatre in January 2020. After delivering three shows in Los Angeles, a filmed copy was sent to Kevin Hart, who subsequently met up with Hughes in Las Vegas.

In 2020, the show was filmed and released for Netflix, becoming Hughes' first special for the streaming service. It was directed by Kristian Mercado and produced by Hart. The recording was initially scheduled for March 2020, according to Hughes, but was delayed due to the COVID-19 pandemic. It was to be delivered at the first Netflix Is A Joke festival on 29 April 2020 before the festival's cancellation. To record the special, Hughes moved from the U.K. to Los Angeles, and was forced to remain in the U.S. during the period of travel restrictions that began a few weeks later.

While waiting to film To Catch a D*ck, Hughes landed a role in Netflix's History of Swear Words, the fourth episode of which is about the word dick; she appears in all six episodes, which were released in January 2021. After this role, Netflix's head of comedy suggested she appear in The Netflix Afterparty (January 2021).

To Catch a D*ck premiered on 22 December 2020. In September 2020, Hughes said that she was writing a subsequent special entitled To Catch a Husband.

== Synopsis ==
External videos
- Why Black Dick Size is a Myth
- When Bedroom Roleplay Goes Bad
- The Universal Difference Between Male & Female Comedians; Extracts from To Catch a D*ck

In an opening skit, Hughes gives herself a pep talk while a man performs cunnilingus on her. On stage, Hughes talks about her lack of sexual activity since moving to America—a consequence of the pandemic. She discusses the feeling of pressure to be in a relationship as she enters her 30s. Hughes recounts her grandmother and mother's sexual activity: her mother dropped out of the Olympics when she became pregnant aged 18. Hughes talks about the idea of becoming pregnant and having a baby.

Members of Hughes' family, including her two older brothers, each contributed a name to her full name—London Dionne Micha Stacey Stephanie Estina Knibbs-Hughes. She was unpopular with boys at school but moved to the seaside at the age of 14. She began to have sexual experiences and talks about oral sex, the man's perineum and the stereotype of the large black penis. Hughes began her career hosting Babestation, an adult chat programme, but was fired a few weeks after beginning a segment focused around her feet and shoes. Her next job was as a presenter on CBBC, a children's television programme.

She recounts sexual anecdotes. Hughes dated a man with a foot fetish who bought her shoes but asked for them back after they broke up, when Hughes found evidence of him having an affair. She says that she is attracted to skinny white men and describes a man who asked her to do roleplay as characters from the film Fifty Shades of Grey. She describes a difference in perception of comedians along gender lines, with men being sexually successful and women not so. Hughes advocates for facesitting and then ends with a story about going on a date with a rich investment banker. In a park, he suddenly began vomiting violently as a result of methadone usage, to treat a heroin addiction. After they taxi back to his house, he briefly used the bathroom and then tried to continue kissing her. She left the house and he gave her £300 for a short taxi back home.

== Reception ==
At the Edinburgh Fringe, the show was nominated for the Best Comedy Show category of the 2019 Edinburgh Comedy Awards. Hughes was the first black woman to be nominated in the category. According to the British Comedy Guide, which aggregated 4,500 reviews from 100 sources, Hughes' show received the most five-star reviews of all shows at the festival, with a total of seven, as well as an average rating of over four stars. It was Glamour's number one recommendation out of female stand-up comedy shows at the festival.

The publications which awarded five-star reviews included Broadway Baby, Broadway World, Funny Women and ScotsGay. Hannah Crofts of Broadway Baby said that with her "electric energy", Hughes is "able to command the room and create an atmosphere akin to being round your best mate's house". Broadway World reviewer Bryony Rae Taylor praised the audience participation as "uncomfortable" but "a thing of beauty" and said that Hughes manages to "exude confidence from her every pore". Kate Stone found it "brilliantly joyful" and said Hughes "delivers a performance that could fill the Apollo".

Four-star reviews came from The Arts Desk, The Guardian, The List, The Scotsman and The Telegraph. The Telegraph's Tristram Fane Saunders praised Hughes' "unabashed joy and chutzpah" and "good old-fashioned filth". Brian Logan of The Guardian lauded the "hugely engaging hour of party-comedy" and Hughes' "sassy attitude", "cartoon-expressive face and G-force gusto". Suzanne Black reviewed it as an "irresistible hour of filth and feminism" for The List. Veronica Lee in The Arts Desk summarised: "The jokes occasionally veer towards crude, but Hughes's sass and sheer force of personality win the day". Dominic Maxwell of The Times rated it three stars, saying it "starts out invigorating and ends up exhausting", though with "the odd sharp point to make about race and gender and sexual roles".

Steve Bennett of Chortle gave the Edinburgh Fringe performance four stars in 2019, reviewing that as "a fully raucous hour of frank and funny tales from a battle-hardened veteran of the dating scene" which is "outrageously honest for its own sake" and, though having feminist underpinnings, is a "triumph of vivacity and chutzpah over content". Bennett additionally gave the Netflix special four stars, noting its focus on "exposing of dual standards" and "celebratory and sex-positive" tone. Bennett praised Hughes as "packing some seriously empowering attitude into her knob jokes" but criticised that her "supercharged performance loses some of its potency through the screen". With a 7.5 out of 10 rating for Paste, Clare Martin praised the Netflix recording, writing: "Charisma doesn't even begin to describe how magnetic and electrifying her presence is". Martin found that her openness about sex is "almost expected nowadays" but that her stories are "hilarious and outrageous" and add "a fresh coat of paint on familiar avenues", though the narrative is not "the most tightly constructed". Alamin Yohannes praised Hughes' "raunchy jokes, funny stories, and energetic physical comedy" in Entertainment Weekly. However, Logan found that the special was not as good as the original performance, which lacks the "tumult it creates in a room" and the previous "dissonance between her ego and flamboyance, and her lowly circumstances". Logan gave it three stars.
