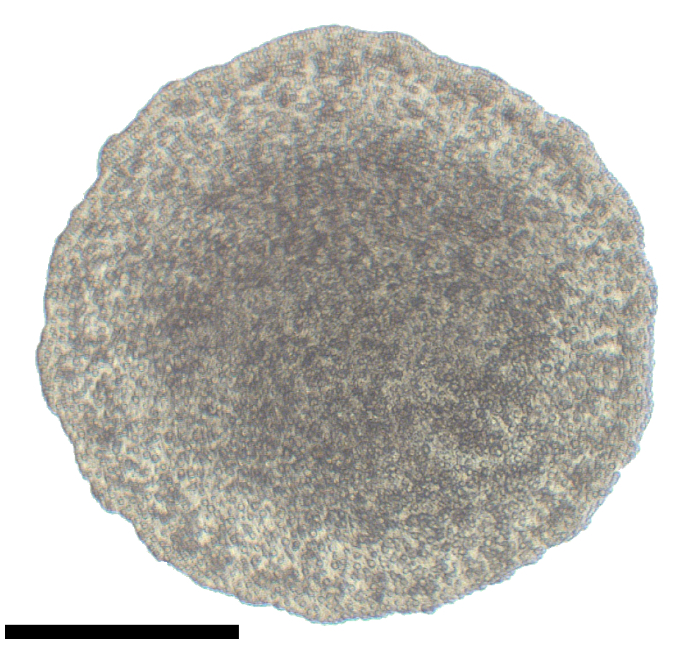
- Microscopic image of Hoilungia hongkongensis. Scale bar is 0.2 mm.

Scientific classification
- Kingdom: Animalia
- Phylum: Placozoa
- Class: Uniplacotomia
- Order: Hoilungea
- Family: Hoilungidae
- Genus: Hoilungia; Eitel, Schierwater & Wörheide, 2018
- Species: H. hongkongensis

Binomial name
- Hoilungia hongkongensis Eitel, Schierwater & Wörheide, 2018

= Hoilungia =

Species of placozoan

Hoilungia is a genus that contains one of the simplest animals and belongs to the phylum Placozoa. Described in 2018, it has only one named species, H. hongkongensis, although there are possible other species. The animal superficially resembles another placozoan, Trichoplax adhaerens, but genetically distinct from it as mitochondrial DNA analysis revealed.

Hoilungia was discovered in brackish water from mangrove swamps in Hong Kong. These organisms are generally found in the biofilm surfaces in tropical and subtropical environments. Phylogenetically, they are placed closest to cnidarians. They are diploblastic animals and are believed to have dorso-ventral polarity along top and bottom body layers. Their body is overtly similar to oral-aboral axis of cnidarians.

== Discovery ==
Trichoplax adhaerens was discovered by the German zoologist Franz Eilhard Schulze in 1883. But its identification as to what kind of animal it was (systematic position) was not known. Another German, Karl Gottlieb Grell, discovered the diversity of these animals and created a new phylum Placozoa, in 1971. Grell derived the name from the placula hypothesis, Otto Bütschli's notion on the origin of metazoans.

The advent of molecular techniques allowed genetic analysis of placozoans. The first important report in 2004 by a team of zoologists at the Institute of Animal Ecology & Cell Biology in Hannover, Germany, led by Allen G. Collins and Bernd Schierwater, indicated that placozoans known under T. adhaerens could be genetically many species. Schierwater, teaming up with Michael Eitel and Gert Wörheide from the Ludwig-Maximilians-Universität München, made further studies and found that the specimen H13 was a different placozoan animal for which they introduced the genus Hoilungia, and the species H. hongkongensis, in 2018.

=== Etymology ===
The genus name is derived from the phrase "hoi lung", which means "sea dragon" in Cantonese. The species name is after Hong Kong from where it was discovered.

== Biology ==
=== Structure ===
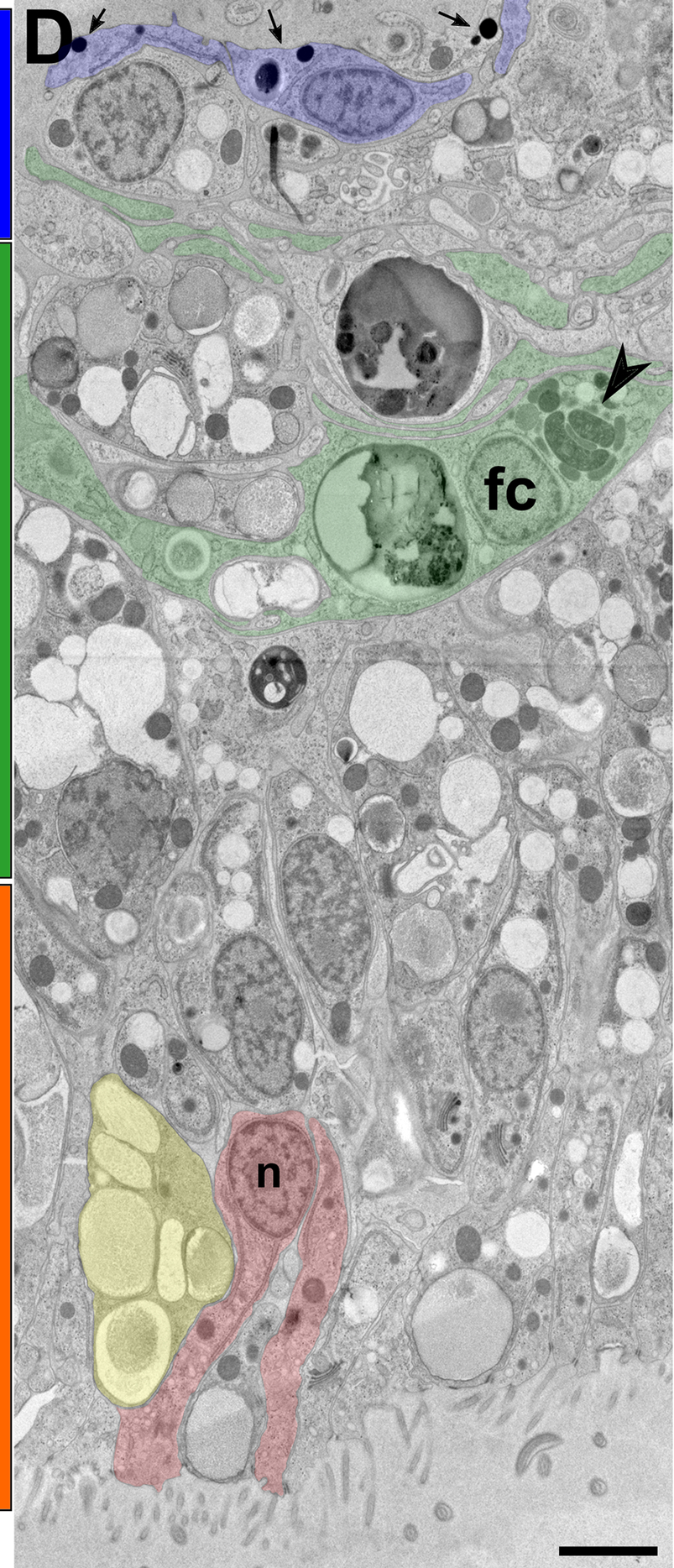
Ultrastructure of Hoilungia Hongkongensis. The upper epithelium (blue bar) with monociliated cells (light blue). The intermediate layer (green bar) consists of nonciliated fiber cells (labeled "fc" in light green). The lower epithelium (orange bar) is mostly made up of monociliated cylinder cells (light red). Scale bar is 2 μm.

Hoilungia do not have well-defined body plan much like amoebas, unicellular eukaryotes. As Andrew Masterson reported, "[as other placozoans] they are as close as it is possible to get to being simply a little living blob." An individual body measures about 0.55 mm in diameter. There are no body parts; as Eitel described: "There's no mouth, there's no back, no nerve cells, nothing."

As do other placozoans, Hoilungia has only three anatomical parts as tissue layers inside its body: the upper, intermediate (middle) and lower epithelia. There are at least six different cell types. The upper epithelium is the thinnest portion and essentially comprises flat cells with their cell body hanging underneath the surface, and each cell having a cilium. Crystal cells are sparsely distributed near the marginal edge. Few cells have unusually large number of mitochondria. The middle layer is the thickest made up of numerous fiber cells, which contain mitochondrial complexes, vacuoles and endosymbiotic bacteria in the endoplasmic reticulum. The lower epithelium consists of numerous monociliated cylinder cells along with a few endocrine-like gland cells and lipophil cells. Each lipophil cell contains numerous middle-sized granules, one of which is a secretory granule.

The body axes of Hoilungia and Trichoplax are overtly similar to the oral–aboral axis of cnidarians, animals from another phylum with which they are most closely related. Structurally, they can not be distinguished from other placozoans, so that identification is purely on genetic (mitochondrial DNA) differences. Genome sequencing has shown that Hoilungia have 164 unique genes and 9 uniquely missing genes compared to other placozoans.

=== Nutrition ===
Hoilungia feed on algae, bacteria, yeast and other byproducts of biofilms. They feed from lower tissue layer which has various peptidergic gland cells.

=== Reproduction ===
Hoilungia reproduce asexually through binary fission and budding. They might also reproduce sexually.

== Evolutionary history ==
Hoilungia and Trichoplax are considered one of the earliest branching animal lineages, and have relatively simple morphologies their complexity of NO-cGMP-mediated signaling is greater to those in vertebrates. This evidence has been found in their DNA by experimentation using ultra-sensitive capillary electrophoresis assays. The genomes of H. hongkongensis and other placozoans add support to the phylogenetic placement of the Placozoa as the most ancient (basal) animals in the tree of life.
