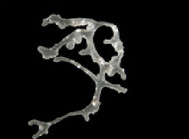

Scientific classification
- Kingdom: Animalia
- Phylum: Placozoa
- Class: Polyplacotomia; Tessler et al., 2022

Type species
- Polyplacotoma mediterranea Osigus et al., 2019

Orders
- Order Polyplacotomea; Family Polyplacotomidae; Genus Polyplacotoma

= Polyplacotomia =

Class of Placozoa

Polyplacotomia is a class of placozoans, to this date only comprising Polyplacotoma mediterranea. It was established in 2022. Their morphology is strikingly different from other placozoans in Uniplacotomia, exhibiting a highly ramified, branching structure with multiple amoeboid projections. It differs from Uniplacotomia by 76 uniquely present and 600 absent genes.
