= What Does the K Stand For? =

What Does the K Stand For? is a BBC Radio Four sitcom series based on the experiences of comedian Stephen K. Amos growing up as a teenager in south London in the 1980s. The broadcast of the first series began in November 2013; the third series commenced in January 2017.

== Critical reception ==
Reviewing Series 1, Episode 1 for Radio Times, Tristram Fane Saunders found the show suited Amos "down to the ground; there's a touch of Seinfeld about What Does the K Stand for? in the way it flows from stand up into a deliciously awkward sitcom".

Writing in The Guardian in February 2015, Priya Elan judged that, "Standup comedian Stephen K Amos's jaunty sitcom What Does The K Stand For? (Radio 4) reaches the end of its second series with possibly the best episode yet. With shades of Chris Rock's Everybody Hates Chris, Amos takes us back to his 80s childhood, growing up gay and black in a dysfunctional household".

However, he added, "Playing it broad by mixing farce with double entendres, the sitcom is slightly uneven: although the family are drawn with wit and sympathy, minor characters like the actress turned teacher Miss Bliss feel less like real people than excuses to weave in a few good dad jokes".

Overall, Elan found, "What lifts the show are the elements of diaspora life weaved throughout, as when Aunty Princess visits from Nigeria and accuses Virginia [Stephen's mother] of cultural betrayal ('You have adopted too many fine and fancy British ways'). Stephen defends the family by suggesting she should 'go back home', prompting him to reflect that he has turned into his own racist enemy. It's unexpectedly thoughtful stuff, suggesting the third series may be even better."
