= Greville Stevens =

English amateur cricketer who played for Middlesex and England (1901-1970)

Personal information
- Full name: Greville Thomas Scott Stevens
- Born: 7 January 1901; Hampstead, London
- Died: 19 September 1970 (aged 69); Islington, London
- Batting: Right-handed
- Bowling: Leg break

International information
- National side: England
- Test debut: 23 December 1922 v South Africa
- Last Test: 6 February 1930 v West Indies

Career statistics
Competition	Test	First-class
Matches	10	243
Runs scored	263	10,376
Batting average	15.47	29.56
100s/50s	0/1	12/55
Top score	69	182
Balls bowled	1,186	32,625
Wickets	20	684
Bowling average	32.40	26.84
5 wickets in innings	2	29
10 wickets in match	1	5
Best bowling	5/90	8/38
Catches/stumpings	9/–	214/–
- Source: CricInfo, 20 July 2021

Greville Thomas Scott Stevens (7 January 1901 – 19 September 1970) was an English amateur cricketer who played for Middlesex, the University of Oxford and England. A leg-spin and googly bowler and attacking batsman, he captained England in one Test match, in South Africa in 1927. He was widely regarded as one of the leading amateur cricketers of his generation who, because of his commitments outside cricket, was unable to fulfil his potential and left the game early.

Stevens was an outstanding schoolboy cricketer, whose exploits at University College School brought him to the attention of Middlesex, for whom he made his debut in 1919 while still at school. He won cricket blues at the Oxford in each of the years 1920 to 1923, and was captain of the university side in 1922. He played for Middlesex between 1919 and 1932, and appeared altogether in 10 Test matches. The first of these was against South Africa in 1922–23, the last against the West Indies in 1929–30. He was a member of the side that regained the Ashes from Australia in 1926.

Had he been able to devote himself more fully to cricket, Stevens's overall first-class record would, in the view of commentators, have been more impressive. After he left Oxford in 1923, his cricket appearances became increasingly intermittent, and in 1932, at the age of 31, he gave up the first-class game altogether, although he played in occasional minor matches until 1947. He served as an officer in the Royal Naval Volunteer Reserve during the Second World War.

== Cricket career ==
=== School, Middlesex debut and Oxford ===
University College School in the early 20th century

Stevens was born and grew up in Hampstead, North London, where he attended University College School. There, he began to show considerable talent as a cricketer, as a bowler of leg-breaks and googlies, and this was recognised in 1918 when Wisden, widely regarded as the "bible of cricket", named him as one of "Five School Bowlers of the Year". (Note: In the absence of first-class cricket during the First World War, Wisden suspended its regular "Five Cricketers of the Year" feature after 1915. In 1918 and 1919 a version of the feature, relating to public schools cricket, was introduced as an interim measure.) In the following season, 1919, he created a batting sensation by scoring 466 runs for Beta House v. Lambda House, in an internal school match. This feat attracted the attention of Middlesex County Cricket Club, who drafted him into their side to play Hampshire at Lord's on 9–10 June 1919. On his county debut Stevens took 10 Hampshire wickets in the match, including 7 for 104 in their first innings. Stevens held his place in the Middlesex XI for the remainder of the season, and was chosen to play for the Gentleman in the prestigious Gentlemen v. Players fixture at Lord's – an almost unprecedented honour for a schoolboy cricketer. In the match he scored 24 and 11, and took 1 wicket for 62 runs.

In the autumn of 1919 Stevens entered Brasenose College, Oxford. In his first match for the university, against Warwickshire, he took 5 for 35 in the county's first innings. He was a regular member of the side for each of his four years' residence, the batting highlights of which were two centuries scored in 1923: 115 against the MCC, and 182 (his best first-class score) against the West Indies touring side. He gained his cricket "blue" in 1920, his freshman year, and in each of the following three years, and was captain in 1922. His performances in the University matches against Cambridge were modest until his final year, 1923, when his bowling – he took 6 for 20 in the Cambridge first innings – played a significant part in Oxford's overwhelming victory that year.

In all, Stevens played 40 matches for Oxford University, scoring 2,484 runs with two centuries, for a batting average of 38.81. He took 146 wickets for a bowling average of 19.91, and held 54 catches.

=== Middlesex and England ===
==== County ====
While at Oxford, Stevens played for Middlesex when the university term was over, and helped the county to win the County Championship title in 1920 and 1921. In 1922 he recorded the best bowling figures of his career, 8 for 38, for Middlesex against Hampshire, at Portsmouth. After leaving Oxford, the need to earn a living affected his availability to play regular cricket for Middlesex; his appearances became less frequent, and in 1928 and 1929 he did not appear for the county at all. (Note: From 1924 to 1930 Stevens's appearances for Middlesex were: 1924, 14; 1925, 9; 1926, 9; 1927, 6; 1928, 0; 1929, 0; 1930, 6.) He managed almost a full season in 1931, when he made his highest score for the county – 170 not out against Warwickshire at Edgbaston, and appeared regularly in the first part of the 1932 season, but at the end of June withdrew from the side and played no more county cricket. That was end of his first-class career, except for a couple of festival games in 1933.

For Middlesex, Stevens played 127 matches between 1919 and 1932. He scored a total of 5,434 runs for the county, including 7 centuries, for a batting average of 30.18. He took 385 wickets, with a bowling average of 27.41, and held 107 catches.

==== England ====
While still at Oxford, Stevens was invited to go to South Africa with the 1922–23 MCC touring side under Frank Mann. (Note: At that time, and until 1976–77, England toured under the aegis of the MCC, and played their matches as "MCC" except for the Tests, which they played as "England".) The team played a series of five Test matches against the South African side; Stevens played in the first of these, at the Wanderers ground, Johannesburg, beginning on 23 December 1922. He made little impression on the game, and did not feature in the rest of the Test series.

Stevens's next Test opportunity came in 1926, in the fourth Test against Australia. During the match England's captain, Arthur Carr, was taken ill and had to withdraw. A stand-in captain was required; at the time, practice and tradition suggested the choice of an amateur. Thus, as the only other amateur in the team, Stevens might have been asked to fulfil this role. However, he was the youngest and least experienced in a side that included several veteran professionals. The selectors broke with the amateur captain tradition and chose Jack Hobbs, who accepted but only after first offering to defer to Stevens. The match was drawn, as had been the previous three; Stevens kept his place for the decider at The Oval, which England won and thus regained the Ashes. (Note: Hobbs was not retained as captain for the final Test, nor was Carr; instead, the captaincy was given to another young amateur, Percy Chapman.)

These two matches against Australia were Stevens's only Test appearances in England. He made two further MCC tours: to South Africa again in 1927–28, under R.T. Stanyforth, and to the West Indies in 1929–30, under Freddie Calthorpe. In South Africa, Stevens played in all five Tests, unproductively except for a score of 69 in the third Test at Durban. For the fifth Test of the series Stanyforth was unfit, and Stevens assumed the England captaincy for this one match, which was lost. In the West Indies he played in two Tests, in the first of which he took ten wickets: 5 for 105 and 5 for 90 – his best bowling performance in Test cricket.

Stevens played in 10 Tests altogether, scoring 263 runs, average 15.47, and taking 20 wickets, average 32.40. He also held 9 catches.

=== Other matches ===
Alongside his county and Test appearances, Stevens played regularly for the Gentlemen, for whom he scored two centuries in Gentlemen v. Players matches. He often turned out in the end-of-season Scarborough Festival matches, for various sides. In early 1932 he went with Lord Tennyson's XI to Jamaica, and played in three representative matches, all of which were won by Jamaica. In the first of these, Jamaica scored 702 for 5 declared (George Headley 344 not out); Stevens's bowling figures were 2 for 194. In the second match, however, Stevens recorded one of his best bowling analyses, taking 8 for 87 in the Jamaicans' first innings. In the third game Stevens achieved figures of 3–199 in Jamaica's first innings, but came close to winning the match for Tennyson's XI with 4 for 63 in the second innings.

=== First-class record ===
In all first-class cricket, Stevens played in 243 matches. He scored 10,376 runs, average 29.56, with 12 centuries, highest score 182. He took 684 wickets, average 26.84, best analysis 8 for 38, and held 213 catches.

== Later life ==
After his first-class cricket career was over, Stevens played in occasional minor matches, including several for The Forty Club in 1938–39. After the Second World War in which he served as a Royal Naval Volunteer Reserve officer, he toured The Netherlands with the Free Foresters side, in August and September 1947 when he was 46 years old. He died at his home in Islington on 19 September 1970.

Stevens was widely regarded as one of the finest amateur cricketers of his time. However, like other prominent amateurs of his era such as Gubby Allen and Douglas Jardine, he had to arrange his cricket around the demands of his working life. In his case this eventually proved too difficult, hence his early departure from the game. Commentators accept that, had he been able to spare more time for cricket, he would have improved his career record considerably. Alan Gibson, in his history of the England Test captaincy, comments on his modest Test figures: "[T]his is not sufficient evidence to say he would have been a poor Test player, had he been able to give himself more opportunities". Whether he would have proved a successful England captain, Gibson adds, is equally hard to say.

== Notes and references ==
=== Sources ===
==== Books ====
- Gibson, Alan (1989). The Cricket Captains of England. London: The Pavilion Library. ISBN 978-1-851-453955.
- Wilde, Simon (2013). Wisden Cricketers of the Year: A Celebration of Cricket's Greatest Players. London: Bloomsbury Publishing. ISBN 978-1-4081-40840.
- Wilde, Simon (2019). England: the Biography. London: Simon & Schuster. ISBN 978-1-4711-5485-0.

==== Online ====
- "1931–32 Lord Tennyson's XI in Jamaica". windiescricket.com.
- "Cricket archive subscription page". Cricket archive. (subscription required)
- "Greville Stevens: England". Cricinfo (republished from Wisden 1971).
- "John Wisden: The man who gave cricket fans their bible". CricketNext.
- "Lord Tennyson's XI in Jamaica: Feb/Mar 1932". Cricinfo.
- "MCC team in South Africa, 1922–23". Cricinfo (republished from Wisden 1924).
- "MCC team in South Africa, 1927–28". Cricinfo (republished from Wisden 1929).
- "MCC team in the West Indies, 1929–30". Cricinfo (republished from Wisden 1931).
- Middlesex County Cricket Club archive

- "First-class matches played by Greville Stevens". Middlesex CCC archive.
- "First-class batting and fielding in each season by Greville Stevens". Middlesex CCC archive.
- "First-class bowling in each season by Greville Stevens". Middlesex CCC archive.
- "First-class batting and fielding for each team by Greville Stevens". Middlesex CCC archive.
- "First-class bowling for each team by Greville Stevens". Middlesex CCC archive.
- "Test batting and fielding each season by Greville Stevens". Middlesex CCC archive.
- "Test bowling in each season by Greville Stevens". Middlesex CCC archive.
- "Miscellaneous matches played by Greville Stevens". Middlesex CCC archive.

- "On board HMS Mauritius at sea, 12 May 1942". Imperial War Museum.

==== Matchcards ====
- "Middlesex v. Hampshire, Lord's, 9–10 June 1919". Cricinfo.
- "Gentlemen v. Players, Lord's, 14–16 July 1919". Cricinfo.
- "Oxford University v. Warwickshire, 5–7 May 1920". Cricinfo.
- "Hampshire v. Middlesex, Portsmouth, 22–24 July 1922". Cricinfo.
- "Oxford University v. West Indians, 6–8 June 1923". Cricinfo.
- "Marylebone Cricket Club v Oxford University, 4–6 July 1923". Cricinfo.
- "3rd Test, England tour of South Africa at Durban, Jan 21–25 1928". Cricinfo.
- "1st Test, England tour of West Indies at Bridgetown, Jan 11-16 1930". Cricinfo.
- "Warwickshire v. Middlesex, Edgbaston, 1–3 July 1931". Cricinfo.
