= Scrambled! =

- Genre: Children's
- Created by: David Hallam and Nigel Pickard
- Starring: Laura Jackson (2014); Luke Franks; Sam Homewood; London Hughes (2014–2018); Arielle Free (2015–2019); Kerry Boyne (2018–2021); Robyn Richford (2019–2021)
- Countries of origin: United Kingdom and Ireland
- Original language: English
- No. of series: 10
- No. of episodes: 367

Production
- Running time: 115-120 minutes
- Production company: Zodiak Kids Studios UK (Note: Known as The Foundation until 2016)

Original release
- Network: ITV (CITV)
- Release: 18 January 2014 – 11 April 2021

Related
- Holly & Stephen's Saturday Showdown

Scrambled! is a British children's weekend morning television show which aired on CITV and ITV between 2014 and 2021. It is the first regular studio-based children's show on ITV since both Toonattik and Holly and Stephen's Saturday Showdown ended. Scrambled! was produced by Zodiak Kids Studios UK (part of Banijay Kids & Family). For most of its run, the show usually broadcast on Saturday and Sunday mornings from January to April, with special episodes recorded for the Christmas period.

== Overview ==
Scrambled! first aired on ITV and CITV on 18 January 2014. It was presented by Sam Homewood, Laura Jackson, London Hughes and Luke Franks. It was the only series to feature the original four presenters.

The second series launched on 10 January 2015. A new presenter, Arielle Free replaced Laura Jackson. The series ran until 12 April 2015.

The third series started on 9 January 2016 and ran until April 2016.

The fourth series was the first autumn run in September 2016.

The fifth series ran from January to April 2017.

The sixth series was the second autumn run in September 2017.

The seventh series ran from January to April 2018.

The eighth series was the first to air for a full six months and launched in October 2018, introducing a new presenter, Kerry Boyne, in place of London Hughes, who had left the show to be a full-time comedian. The series ended in April 2019.

The ninth series launched in October 2019, introducing Robyn Richford as a replacement for Arielle Free, who had left the show to host the weekend early breakfast show on BBC Radio 1. The first half of this series was only aired on Saturday mornings, but was restored to Sundays in 2020. The series concluded in April 2020, following the onset of the COVID-19 pandemic, however the final episodes had been pre-recorded prior to the onset of the UK national quarantine.

The 10th and final series of Scrambled! launched on 19 September 2020. The series concluded on 11 April 2021.

== Format ==
Scrambled! was a pre-recorded show set in the "Scrambled! flat", in which the presenters would perform various variety sketches, with a selection of cartoons shown in between. The show's jingle was "Saturday, Sunday Scrambled! Show!"

Each episode ended with the presenters saying "Scramble, don't dangle!" which became the show's catchphrase.

A puppet character called 'Mr. Cuddle Monster' was introduced to the show in series two, which was designed and built by Puppets Magic Studio. 'Mr. Cuddle Monster' was known as the Scrambled! Landlord, who hates cuddles and pretends to dislike the Scrambled! presenters, hence his ironic name.

== Cancellation ==
On 9 April 2021, ITV confirmed that Scrambled! has ended and would not be returning for a new series later in the year. The final weekend of Scrambled! aired on ITV on 10–11 April 2021, ending in a "best bits" montage of various moments from the show's seven-year history. Sam Homewood and Luke Franks presented all 367 episodes of the show.

== YouTube channel ==
The official Scrambled! YouTube channel was created on 1 December 2014 and the first video was uploaded on 20 January 2015. The videos include games, clips from the show, Q&As and behind the scenes. The video with the most views (as of 12 September 2015) is 'Welcome to Our Channel!'
