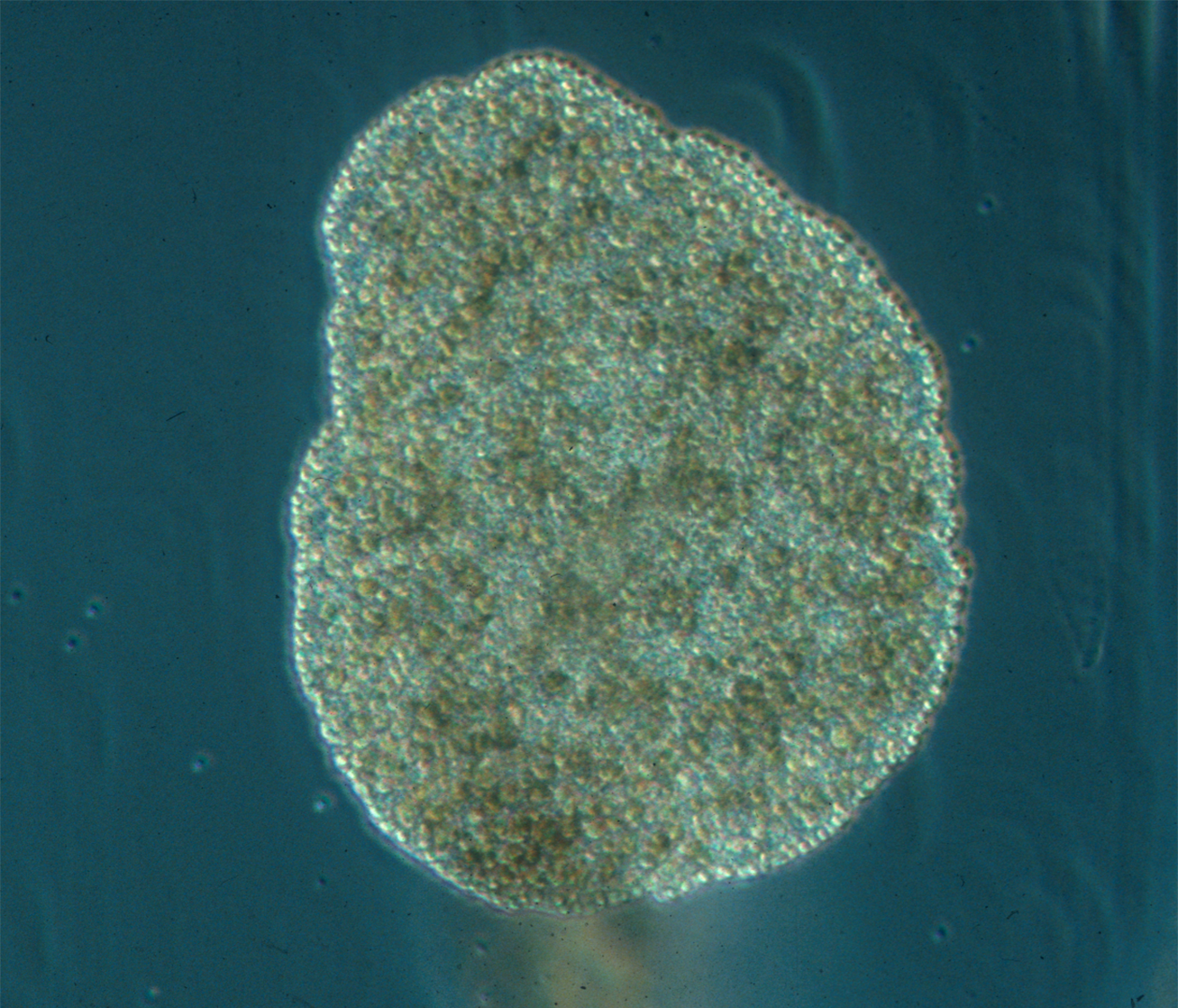
- Trichoplax adhaerens

Scientific classification
- Kingdom: Animalia
- Subkingdom: Eumetazoa
- Clade: ParaHoxozoa
- Phylum: Placozoa; Grell, 1971

Type species
- Trichoplax adhaerens Schulze, 1883

Classes
- Class Polyplacotomia; Order Polyplacotomea; Family Polyplacotomidae; Class Uniplacotomia; Order Trichoplacea; Family Trichoplacidae; Order Cladhexea; Undescribed species; Order Hoilungea; Family Cladtertiidae; Family Hoilungidae

= Placozoa =

Placozoans Temporal range: Recent Possible Middle Triassic record

Phylum of aquatic animals

Placozoa (/ˌplækəˈzoʊə/ PLAK-ə-ZOH-ə; lit. 'flat animals') is a phylum of free-living (non-parasitic) marine invertebrates. They are blob-like animals composed of aggregations of cells. Moving in water by ciliary motion, eating food by engulfment, and reproducing by fission or budding, placozoans are described as "the simplest animals on Earth". Structural and molecular analyses have supported them as among the most basal animals, thus constituting a primitive metazoan phylum.

The first known placozoan, Trichoplax adhaerens, was discovered in 1883 by the German zoologist Franz Eilhard Schulze (1840–1921). Recognizing its distinctive characteristics, the German zoologist Karl Gottlieb Grell (1912–1994) erected a new phylum, Placozoa, for it in 1971. Remaining a monotypic phylum for over a century, new species began to be added in 2018. So far, three other extant species have been described, in two distinct classes: Uniplacotomia (Hoilungia hongkongensis in 2018 and Cladtertia collaboinventa in 2022) and Polyplacotomia (Polyplacotoma mediterranea, the most basal, in 2019). A single putative fossil species is known, the Middle Triassic Maculicorpus microbialis.

== History ==
Trichoplax was discovered in 1883 by the German zoologist Franz Eilhard Schulze, in a seawater aquarium at the Zoological Institute in Graz, Austria. The generic name is derived from the classical Greek θρίξ (thrix), meaning "hair", and πλάξ (plax), "plate". The specific epithet adhaerens is Latin meaning "adherent", reflecting its propensity to stick to the glass slides and pipettes used in its examination. Schulze realized that the animal could not be a member of any existing phyla, and based on the simple structure and behaviour, concluded in 1891 that it must be an early metazoan. He also observed the reproduction by fission, cell layers and locomotion.

In 1893, Italian zoologist Francesco Saverio Monticelli described another animal which he named Treptoplax, the specimens of which he collected from Naples. He gave the species name T. reptans in 1896. Monticelli did not preserve them and no other specimens were found again, as a result of which the identification is ruled as doubtful, and the species rejected.

Schulze's description was opposed by other zoologists. For instance, in 1890, F.C. Noll argued that the animal was a flatworm (Turbellaria). In 1907, Thilo Krumbach published a hypothesis that Trichoplax is not a distinct animal but that it is a form of the planula larva of the anemone-like hydrozoan Eleutheria krohni. Although this was refuted in print by Schulze and others, Krumbach's analysis became the standard textbook explanation, and nothing was printed in zoological journals about Trichoplax until the 1960s.

The development of electron microscopy in the mid-20th century allowed in-depth observation of the cellular components of organisms, following which there was renewed interest in Trichoplax starting in 1966. The most detailed descriptions were made by Karl Gottlieb Grell at the University of Tübingen beginning in 1971. That year, Grell revived Schulze's interpretation that the animals are unique and created a new phylum Placozoa. Grell derived the name from the placula hypothesis, Otto Bütschli's notion on the origin of metazoans.

== Biology ==
=== Anatomy ===
Trichoplax body structure in cross section 1 - lipid drop, 2 - cilium, 3 - dorsal layer of cells, 4 - vacuole, 5 - fibrous syncytium, 6 - glandular cell, 7 - vacuole, 8 - ventral layer of cells, 9 - zones of intercellular contacts

Placozoans lack a well-defined body plan and have a simple, flattened body. As Andrew Masterson reported: "they are as close as it is possible to get to being simply a little living blob." An individual body measures about 0.55 mm in diameter. There are no body parts; as one of the researchers Michael Eitel described: "There's no mouth, there's no back, no nerve cells, nothing." Animals studied in laboratories have bodies consisting of everything from hundreds to millions of cells.

Placozoans have only three anatomical parts as tissue layers inside its body: the upper, intermediate (middle) and lower epithelia. There are at least six different cell types. (A 2023 analysis of 4 species across 3 genera found 8, one with an unknown role.) The upper epithelium is the thinnest portion and essentially comprises flat cells with their cell body hanging underneath the surface, and each cell having a cilium. Crystal cells are sparsely distributed near the marginal edge. A few cells have unusually large number of mitochondria. The middle layer is the thickest made up of numerous fiber cells, which contain mitochondrial complexes, vacuoles and endosymbiotic bacteria in the endoplasmic reticulum. The lower epithelium consists of numerous monociliated cylinder cells along with a few endocrine-like gland cells and lipophil cells. Each lipophil cell contains numerous middle-sized granules, one of which is a secretory granule.

The body axes of Hoilungia and Trichoplax are similar to the oral–aboral axis of cnidarians, animals from another phylum with which they are most closely related. Structurally, they can not be distinguished from other placozoans, so that identification is purely on genetic (mitochondrial DNA) differences. Genome sequencing has shown that each species has a set of unique genes and several uniquely missing genes.

Trichoplax is a small, flattened, animal around 1 mm (0.039 in) across. An amorphous multi-celled body, analogous to a single-celled amoebas, it has no regular outline, although the lower surface is somewhat concave, and the upper surface is always flattened. The body consists of an outer layer of simple epithelium enclosing a loose sheet of stellate cells resembling the mesenchyme of some more complex animals. The epithelial cells bear cilia, which the animal uses to help it creep along the seafloor.

The lower surface engulfs small particles of organic detritus, on which the animal feeds.

Studies suggest that aragonite crystals in crystal cells have the same function as statoliths, allowing it to use gravity for spatial orientation.

Located in the dorsal epithelium there are lipid granules which release a cocktail of toxins as a means of defense, and can induce paralysis or death in some predators. Genes encoding for proteins which make up the poisonous secretions of Trichoplax have been found to resemble venom-associated genes present in the genomes of certain snakes, like the American copperhead and the West African carpet viper.

==== Proto-nervous system ====
The Placozoa have a very primitive analogue of the nervous system. It has peptidergic cells that resemble neurons in that they have G protein-coupled receptors and release vesicles and neuropeptides. They are descended from progenitor cells with an expression pattern similar to that of neuron progenitor cells and themselves express genes associated with the pre-synaptic scaffold. Still, they differ from cnidarian neurons by having no projections and not expressing genes of the post-synaptic scaffold. There are a total of 14 types of these peptidergic cells.

Despite their absence of neurons, they are able to produce electrical impulses.

=== Reproduction ===
All placozoans can reproduce asexually, budding off smaller individuals, and the lower surface may also bud off eggs into the mesenchyme. Sexual reproduction has been reported to occur in one clade of placozoans, whose strain H8 was later found to belong to genus Cladtertia, where intergenic recombination was observed as well as other hallmarks of sexual reproduction.

In addition to fission, representatives of all species produced "swarmers" (a separate vegetative reproduction stage), which could also be formed from the lower epithelium with greater cell-type diversity.

=== Endosymbionts ===
Some Trichoplax species contain Rickettsiales bacteria as endosymbionts. One of the at least 20 described species turned out to have two bacterial endosymbionts; Grellia which lives in the animal's endoplasmic reticulum and is assumed to play a role in the protein and membrane production. The other endosymbiont is the first described Margulisbacteria, that lives inside cells used for algal digestion. It appears to eat the fats and other lipids of the algae and provide its host with vitamins and amino acids in return.

=== Evolution and population dynamics ===
The Placozoa show substantial evolutionary radiation in regard to sodium channels, of which they have 5–7 different types, more than any other invertebrate species studied to date.

Three modes of population dynamics depended upon feeding sources, including induction of social behaviors, morphogenesis, and reproductive strategies.

=== Distribution ===
Global distribution

== Internal phylogeny ==
The internal relationships among placozoa has been studied using ribosomal DNA, mitochondrial DNA, and phylogenomics (gene content comparison). The latter methods require the sequencing of more DNA but produce more reliable results. Tessler et al. (2022) recovered the following maximum likelihood phylogenomic tree based on genomic data and reformed the inner taxonomy of the group based on these results:

- Placozoa
  - Polyplacotomia
    - Polyplacotomea
      - Polyplacotomidae
        Polyplacotoma mediterranea H0
  - Uniplacotomia
    - Trichoplacea
      - Trichoplacidae
        - Trichoplax H17
        - - Trichoplax adhaerens H1
          - Trichoplax H2
    - - Cladhexea
        H11
      - Hoilungea
        - Cladtertiidae
          - Cladtertia collaboinventa H23
          - Cladtertia H6
        - Hoilungidae
          - H19
          - - H24
            - - - Hoilungia hongkongensis H13
                - Hoilungia H4
              - - Hoilungia H15
                - Hoilungia H25

Placozoa Grell, 1971

- Class Polyplacotomia Tessler, Neumann, Osigus, DeSalle & Schierwater, 2022
  - Order Polyplacotomea Tessler, Neumann, Osigus, DeSalle & Schierwater, 2022
    - Family Polyplacotomidae Tessler, Neumann, Osigus, DeSalle & Schierwater, 2022
- Class Uniplacotomia Tessler, Neumann, Osigus, DeSalle & Schierwater, 2022
  - Order Trichoplacea Tessler, Neumann, Osigus, DeSalle & Schierwater, 2022
    - Family Trichoplacidae Bütschli & Hatschek, 1905
  - Order Cladhexea Tessler, Neumann, Osigus, DeSalle & Schierwater, 2022
    - Suggested future new family
  - Order Hoilungea Tessler, Neumann, Osigus, DeSalle & Schierwater, 2022
    - Family Cladtertiidae Tessler, Neumann, Osigus, DeSalle & Schierwater, 2022
    - Family Hoilungidae Tessler, Neumann, Osigus, DeSalle & Schierwater, 2022

== Evolutionary relationships ==
Although there is no convincing fossil record of the Placozoa, proarticulates from the Ediacaran biota (Precambrian, 550 million years ago) such as Dickinsonia have been suggested to be stem-placozoans based on some similarities in anatomy and lifestyle, feeding on algal mats through a ventral epithelium. Knaust (2021) reported preservation of placozoan fossils in a microbialite bed from the Middle Triassic Muschelkalk (Germany).

Traditionally, classification was based on their level of organization, i.e., they possess no tissues or organs. However this may be as a result of secondary loss and thus is inadequate to exclude them from relationships with more complex animals. More recent work has attempted to classify them based on the DNA sequences in their genome; this has placed the phylum between the sponges and the Eumetazoa. In such a feature-poor phylum, molecular data are considered to provide the most reliable approximation of the placozoans' phylogeny.

Their exact position on the phylogenetic tree would give important information about the origin of neurons and muscles. If the absence of these features is an original trait of the Placozoa, it would mean that a nervous system and muscles evolved three times should placozoans and cnidarians be a sister group: once in the Ctenophora, once in the Cnidaria and once in the Bilateria. If they branched off before the Cnidaria and Bilateria split, neurons and muscles would have the same origin in the two latter groups.

=== Functional-morphology hypothesis: Sister to Porifera and Eumetazoa ===
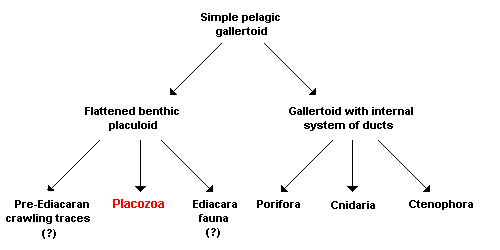
The Placozoa descending side by side with the sponges, cnidarians and ctenophores from a gallertoid by processes of differentiation

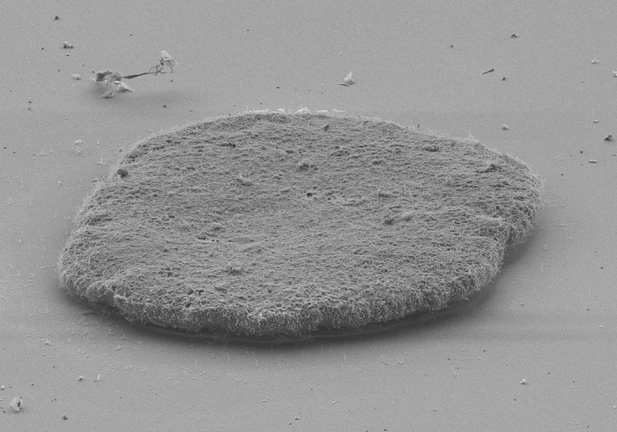
A placozoan is a small, flattened animal, typically about one mm across and about 25 μm thick. Like the amoebae they superficially resemble, they continually change their external shape. In addition, spherical phases occasionally form which may facilitate movement. Trichoplax adhaerens lacks tissues and organs. There is no manifest body symmetry, so it is not possible to distinguish anterior from posterior or left from right. It is made up of a few thousand cells of six types in three distinct layers.

On the basis of their simple structure, the Placozoa were frequently viewed as a model organism for the transition from unicellular organisms to the multicellular animals (Metazoa) and are thus considered a sister taxon to all other metazoans:

- Metazoa
  - Placozoa
  - - Sponges (Porifera)
    - Animals with tissues (Eumetazoa)

According to a functional-morphology model, all or most animals are descended from a gallertoid, a free-living (pelagic) sphere in seawater, consisting of a single ciliated layer of cells supported by a thin, noncellular separating layer, the basal lamina. The interior of the sphere is filled with contractile fibrous cells and a gelatinous extracellular matrix. Both the modern Placozoa and all other animals then descended from this multicellular beginning stage via two different processes:

- Infolding of the epithelium led to the formation of an internal system of ducts and thus to the development of a modified gallertoid from which the sponges (Porifera), Cnidaria and Ctenophora subsequently developed.
- Other gallertoids, according to this model, made the transition over time to a benthic mode of life; that is, their habitat has shifted from the open ocean to the floor (benthic zone). This results naturally in a selective advantage for flattening of the body, as of course can be seen in many benthic species.

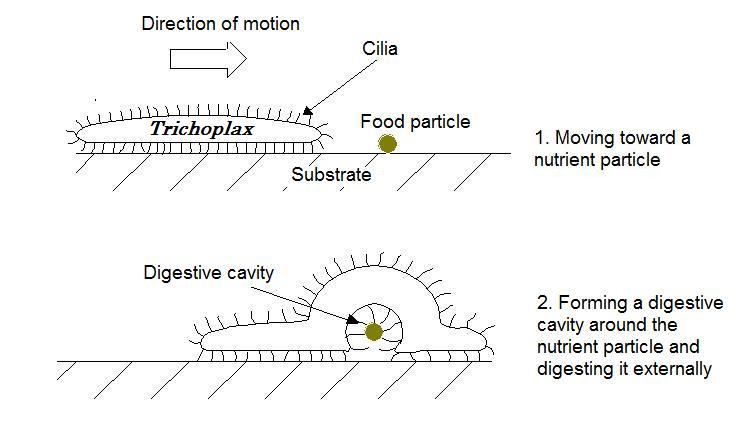
Crawling motility and food uptake by Trichoplax adhaerens

While the probability of encountering food, potential sexual partners, or predators is the same in all directions for animals floating freely in the water, there is a clear difference on the seafloor between the functions useful on body sides facing toward and away from the substrate, leading their sensory, defensive, and food-gathering cells to differentiate and orient according to the vertical – the direction perpendicular to the substrate. In the proposed functional-morphology model, the Placozoa, and possibly several similar organisms only known from the fossils, are descended from such a life form, which is now termed placuloid.

Three different life strategies have accordingly led to three different possible lines of development:

1. Animals that live interstitially in the sand of the ocean floor were responsible for the fossil crawling traces that are considered the earliest evidence of animals; and are detectable even prior to the dawn of the Ediacaran period in geology. These are usually attributed to bilaterally symmetrical worms, but the hypothesis presented here views animals derived from placuloids, and thus close relatives of Trichoplax adhaerens, to be the producers of the traces.
2. Animals that incorporated algae as photosynthetically active endosymbionts, i.e. primarily obtaining their nutrients from their partners in symbiosis, were accordingly responsible for the mysterious creatures of the Ediacara fauna that are not assigned to any modern animal taxon and lived during the Ediacaran period, before the start of the Paleozoic. However, recent work has shown that some of the Ediacaran assemblages (e.g. Mistaken Point) were in deep water, below the photic zone, and hence those individuals could not dependent on endosymbiotic photosynthesisers.
3. Animals that grazed on algal mats would ultimately have been the direct ancestors of the Placozoa. The advantages of an amoeboid multiplicity of shapes thus allowed a previously present basal lamina and a gelatinous extracellular matrix to be lost secondarily. Pronounced differentiation between the surface facing the substrate (ventral) and the surface facing away from it (dorsal) accordingly led to the physiologically distinct cell layers of Trichoplax adhaerens that can still be seen today. Consequently, these are analogous, but not homologous, to ectoderm and endoderm – the "external" and "internal" cell layers in eumetazoans – i.e. the structures corresponding functionally to one another have, according to the proposed hypothesis, no common evolutionary origin.

Should any of the analyses presented above turn out to be correct, Trichoplax adhaerens would be the oldest branch of the multicellular animals, and a relic of the Ediacaran fauna, or even the pre-Ediacara fauna. Although very successful in their ecological niche, due to the absence of extracellular matrix and basal lamina, the development potential of these animals was of course limited, which would explain the low rate of evolution of their phenotype (their outward form as adults) – referred to as bradytely.

This hypothesis was supported by a recent analysis of the Trichoplax adhaerens mitochondrial genome in comparison to those of other animals. The hypothesis was, however, rejected in a statistical analysis of the Trichoplax adhaerens whole genome sequence in comparison to the whole genome sequences of six other animals and two related non-animal species, but only at the p = 0.07 level, which indicates a marginal level of statistical significance.

=== Epitheliozoa hypothesis: Sister to Eumetazoa ===
A concept based on purely morphological characteristics pictures the Placozoa as the nearest relative of the animals with true tissues (Eumetazoa). The taxon they share, called the Epitheliozoa, is itself construed to be a sister group to the sponges (Porifera):

- Metazoa
  - Porifera
  - Epitheliozoa
    - Placozoa
    - Eumetazoa

The above view could be correct, although there is some evidence that the ctenophores, traditionally seen as Eumetazoa, may be the sister to all other animals. This is now a disputed classification. Placozoans are estimated to have emerged 750–800 million years ago, and the first modern neuron to have originated in the common ancestor of cnidarians and bilaterians about 650 million years ago (many of the genes expressed in modern neurons are absent in ctenophores, although some of these missing genes are present in placozoans).

The principal support for such a relationship comes from special cell to cell junctions – belt desmosomes – that occur not just in the Placozoa but in all animals except the sponges: They enable the cells to join in an unbroken layer like the epitheloid of the Placozoa. T. adhaerens also shares the ventral gland cells with most eumetazoans. Both characteristics can be considered evolutionarily derived features (apomorphies), and thus form the basis of a common taxon for all animals that possess them.

One possible scenario inspired by the proposed hypothesis starts with the idea that the monociliated cells of the epitheloid in T. adhaerens evolved by reduction of the collars in the collar cells (choanocytes) of sponges as the hypothesized ancestors of the Placozoa abandoned a filtering mode of life. The epitheloid would then have served as the precursor to the true epithelial tissue of the eumetazoans.

In contrast to the model based on functional morphology described earlier, in the Epitheliozoa hypothesis, the ventral and dorsal cell layers of the Placozoa are homologs of endoderm and ectoderm — the two basic embryonic cell layers of the eumetazoans. The digestive gastrodermis in the Cnidaria or the gut epithelium in the bilaterally symmetrical animals (Bilateria) may have developed from endoderm, whereas ectoderm is the precursor to the external skin layer (epidermis), among other things. The interior space pervaded by a fiber syncytium in the Placozoa would then correspond to connective tissue in the other animals. It is unclear whether the calcium ions stored in the syncytium would be related to the lime skeletons of many cnidarians.

As noted above, this hypothesis was supported in a statistical analysis of the Trichoplax adhaerens whole genome sequence, as compared to the whole-genome sequences of six other animals and two related non-animal species.

=== Eumetazoa/ParaHoxozoa hypotheses ===
A third hypothesis, based primarily on molecular genetics, views the Placozoa as highly simplified eumetazoans. According to this, Trichoplax adhaerens is descended from considerably more complex animals that already had muscles and nerve tissues. Both tissue types, as well as the basal lamina of the epithelium, were accordingly lost more recently by radical secondary simplification.

Various studies in this regard so far yield differing results for identifying the exact sister group: In one case, the Placozoa would qualify as the nearest relatives of the Cnidaria, while in another they would be a sister group to the Ctenophora, and occasionally they are placed directly next to the Bilateria.

==== Sister to Planulozoa ====
In 2018, they are typically placed according to the cladogram below:

- Metazoa
  - Porifera
  - Eumetazoa Diploblasts / Epitheliozoa
    - Ctenophora
    - ParaHoxozoa
      - Placozoa
      - Planulozoa
        - Cnidaria
        - Bilateria / Triploblasts

In this cladogram the Epitheliozoa and Eumetazoa are synonyms to each other and to the Diploblasts, and the Ctenophora are basal to them.

An argument raised against the proposed scenario is that it leaves morphological features of the animals completely out of consideration. The extreme degree of simplification that would have to be postulated for the Placozoa in this model, moreover, is only known for parasitic organisms, but would be difficult to explain functionally in a free-living species like Trichoplax adhaerens.

This version is supported by statistical analysis of the Trichoplax adhaerens whole genome sequence in comparison to the whole genome sequences of six other animals and two related non-animal species. However, Ctenophora was not included in the analyses, placing the placozoans outside of the sampled Eumetazoans.

This version is more strongly supported by a 2023 analysis using 209 marker genes, Bayesian inference, and a sophisticated substitution model (CAT + GTR + Г4). A few other variations (other gene-sets, recoding) produce the same result. Single-cell genomics performed in the study indicate that the Placozoa do have a primitive version of neurons called peptideric cells. These cells can receive information through GPCRs and release information through vesicles and neuropeptides. They express the pre-synaptic program. Features present in Planulozoan neurons but absent in Placozoan peptideric cells are the post-synaptic program, cell projections, and ion channels; these are believed to have evolved in the Planulozoa ancestor. The Bilaterian neuron build on top of these features by the evolution of specialized synapses, neuronal cytoskeleton, and neuronal cell adhesion.

==== Sister to Cnidaria ====
DNA comparisons suggest that placozoans are related to Cnidaria, derived from planula larva (as seen in some Cnidaria). The Bilateria also are thought to be derived from planuloids. The Cnidaria and Placozoa body axis are overtly similar, and placozoan and cnidarian cells are responsive to the same neuropeptide antibodies despite extant placozoans not developing any neurons.

- Choanozoa 950 mya
  - Choanoflagellata
  - Animalia 760 mya
    - Porifera
    - Eumetazoa
      - Ctenophora
      - ParaHoxozoa 680 mya
        - - Placozoa
          - Cnidaria
        - Bilateria / Triploblasts
