= Stephen K. Amos =

British comedian (born 1967)

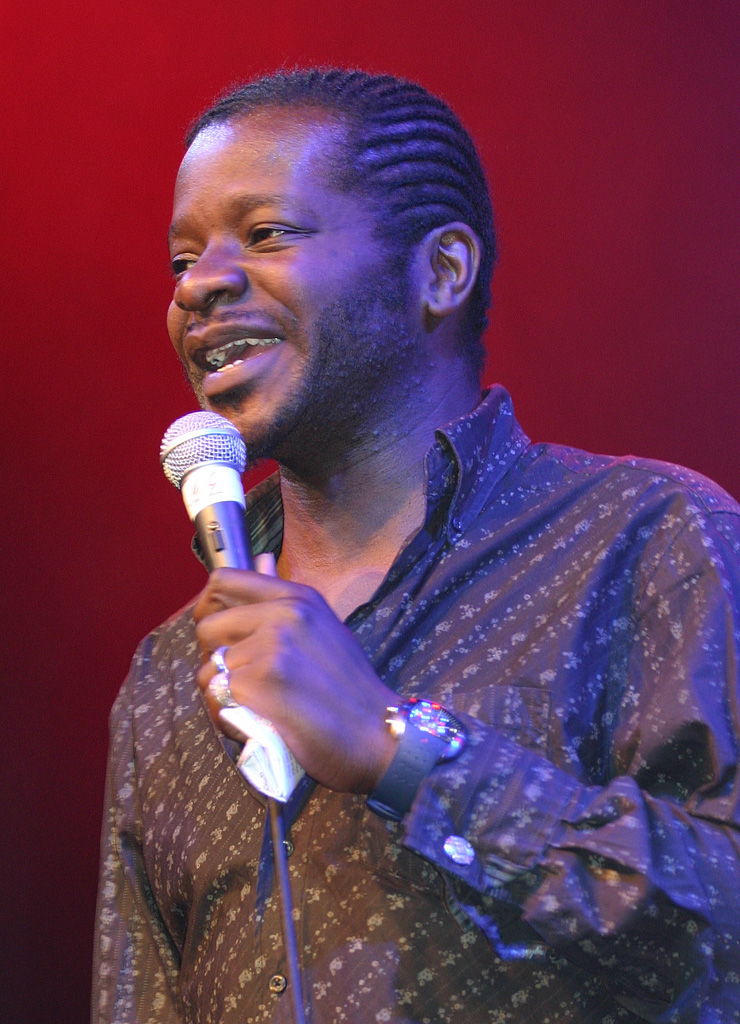
- Amos at the Edinburgh Fringe Festival in 2005
- Born: 3 December 1967 (age 58); London, England

Comedy career
- Medium: Stand up, television
- Genres: Observational comedy, political satire
- Subjects: Australian culture, British culture, Nigerian culture, current events, human interaction, popular culture, racism, sex

Stephen K. Amos (born 3 December 1967) is a British comedian and television personality. A regular on the international comedy circuit, he is known for including his audience members during his shows. He began his career as a compere at the Big Fish comedy clubs in South London, and has been nominated for Chortle's Best Compere Award three times in 2004, 2007 and 2008.

== Performances and tours ==
Amos has performed stand up at the Edinburgh Festival Fringe every year since 2003, after making his debut in 2001. During the 2006 Fringe, he performed the revealing solo show All of Me, in which he publicly acknowledged his own homosexuality to his audience for the first time.

He hosted a chat show on weekends (in addition to his own show), performed as a guest at various extra festival shows, such as Spank!, and performed daily in Stewart Lee's production of Eric Bogosian's play Talk Radio. Away from the fringe, Amos is a regular performer at The Comedy Store, London, featuring on the bill several evenings each month, as well as various other venues around central London.

Amos appeared in the winning team at the Melbourne International Comedy Festival's Great Debate in 2006, 2007, and 2008 for the negative team, and in 2009 for the affirmative team. In May 2007, he appeared at the New Zealand International Comedy festival where he won the award for Best International Comedian. He performed at the 2007 Class Clowns State Final in South Australia.

During the end of 2008 and the beginning of 2009, he embarked on a United Kingdom tour of his show Find the Funny. In the winter of 2009 and 2010, he sold out his second national tour The Feelgood Factor. In 2012 and 2013, he performed his Laughter Is My Agenda tour.

As an actor, he performed in both the Edinburgh Fringe and London run of a version of One Flew Over the Cuckoo's Nest. His debut DVD was released in November 2009 entitled Find The Funny – Live. His second DVD was released in November 2010 entitled The Feelgood Factor.

Amos hosted, and performed a short set on the main stage at London's Gay Pride parade on 3 June 2010. Amos performed on the alternative stage at Reading Festival on 27 August 2010, and the Leeds Festival on 28 August 2010. He received a standing ovation for both performances. In March 2017, Amos featured on the 339th episode of the podcast based in Melbourne, The Little Dum Dum Club, which was recorded live at the European Bier Cafe in Melbourne's CBD.

In 2022, Amos appeared in the West End cast of My Fair Lady at the London Coliseum, playing Alfred P Doolittle.

== Television appearances ==
In the United Kingdom, Amos has appeared as a guest on panel shows such as Have I Got News for You, Mock the Week, QI, The Wright Stuff and And Then You Die. In March 2007, his documentary on homophobia in the black British community and Jamaica, Batty Man, was broadcast by Channel 4. It won a Royal Television Society Award and was nominated for a BAFTA.

He appeared in The Bill ('Compliments of the Service') in 1993. He made a guest appearance as Jimi Hendrix on the third episode of the BBC Three show, Snuff Box. He has also appeared in Rich Hall's Cattle Drive, EastEnders, Stewart Lee's Comedy Vehicle and as a featured performer on BBC One's Live at the Apollo after Dara Ó Briain and before Frankie Boyle. In December 2010, Amos appeared on Live at the Apollo as host and compere.

Amos has the distinction of being one of the few stand-up comics chosen to appear at the 2007 Royal Variety Performance. Amos made an appearance on the gala/comedy gig We Are Most Amused, an ITV1 televised production on 15 November 2008, in celebration of The Prince of Wales' 60th Birthday. The event took place in the New Wimbledon Theatre.

In December 2007, he hosted a documentary, Penis Envy, for the free United Kingdom digital television channel Virgin1, in which he explored men's ongoing insecurities with penis size with the help of actors from Puppetry of the Penis, naked rugby players and the men willing to experiment with apparent penis enlarging "treatments". On a related note, he gently mocks political correctness, in one of his favourite recurring jokes referring to his own penis size: "some stereotypes I can live with!"

While in Australia for the Melbourne International Comedy Festival, Amos often appears on Australian television shows such as the improvisational Thank God You're Here; the music-based panel game show Spicks and Specks; and satirical news based comedy quiz show Good News Week.

In 2009, Stephen appeared on Soccer AM, and is a fan of West Ham United. In 2009, Stephen also appeared on an edition of Children in Need of Mastermind, answering questions on the band Five Star. In March 2010, Amos appeared with the England rugby squad playing Nelson Mandela, in a comedy sketch for the BBC's Sport Relief.

In January 2010, he was a celebrity guest team captain on What Do Kids Know? along with Rufus Hound, Joe Swash and Sara Cox on Watch. Stephen guest appeared in Series 2, Episode 7 of the BBC Three comedy, Coming of Age and as a guest contributor on several episodes of This Week.

In 2010, Amos's own show was launched, a combination of stand up, sketches, and guest performers (who for the most part had not fully broken into television comedy), simply entitled The Stephen K Amos Show. The show was released on DVD in November 2010. In 2010, for the show Tinga Tinga Tales Amos voiced the characters Hyena and Millipede/Pediless. Amos also starred in an episode of Mad Mad World on ITV1 in Spring 2012.

In January 2013, he took part in a special series of The Great British Bake Off.

In 2019, Amos starred in BBC's Pilgrimage, walking Via Francigena, an ancient pilgrimage route to Rome. Amos told Pope Francis, "As a gay man, I don't feel accepted". The Pope responded, "Giving more importance to the adjective rather than the noun, this is not good. We are all human beings and have dignity. It does not matter who you are or how you live your life, you do not lose your dignity. There are people that prefer to select or discard people because of the adjective – these people don't have a human heart."

In March 2024, Amos was announced as a contestant on the tenth season of the Australian version of I'm a Celebrity...Get Me Out of Here! On 17 April 2024, Amos was eliminated from the series, coming in 7th place.

== Radio appearances ==
On 2 November 2008, Amos appeared on The Jon Richardson Show on BBC 6 Music, and again on 16 August 2009 and 23 November 2009. Amos also appeared on Nihal's Saturday Afternoon Show on BBC Radio One on 30 May 2009. Amos is currently featured in the BBC Radio 4 show The Odd Half Hour, which began broadcasting on 16 November 2010.

In 2012, Amos chaired a BBC Radio 4 programme, called Life: An Idiot's Guide, starting March 2012, where he and his pick of the circuit's best stand ups build an idiot's guide to life.

People who have appeared on the show include Lucy Montgomery and Lucy Porter. In February 2013, Amos presented another series of this programme, where guests on the programme included Fred MacAulay, Angela Barnes and Greg Proops. Since December 2013, Amos has also appeared in a purportedly autobiographical radio comedy series What Does the K Stand For? on BBC Radio 4, as a son living in a Nigerian family in 1980s Britain.

The series is co written by Jonathan Harvey, and the third series commenced in January 2017.

== Bibliography ==
- I Used To Say My Mother Was Shirley Bassey (Constable, London, 2012)

== Personal life ==
Amos, one of seven children, lives in South London. His parents came to London from Nigeria in the 1960s. On Fern Britton's The 5 O'Clock Show (Channel 4, 19 July 2010), he stated that his middle name is Kehinde, which is a Yoruba name for "second of twins". Amos had an older twin sister, who died in 2018. He studied criminal justice at the Polytechnic of Central London. He is gay and an atheist.

Amos is a celebrity supporter of the British Red Cross, where he is interested in their work with refugees. Amos is a member of The Arts Emergency Service.
