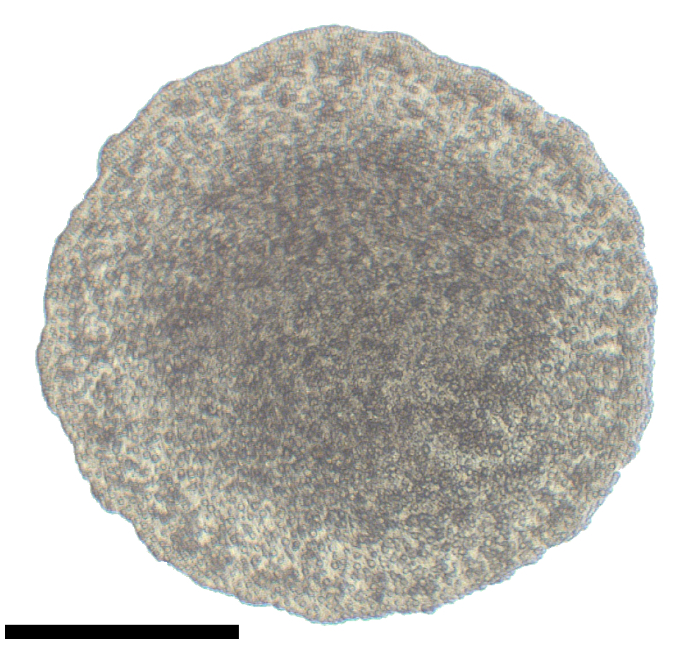
- Hoilungia hongkongensis

Scientific classification
- Domain: Eukaryota
- Kingdom: Animalia
- Phylum: Placozoa
- Class: Uniplacotomia
- Order: Hoilungea; Tessler et al., 2022

Families and genera
- Cladtertiidae; Cladtertia; Hoilungidae; Hoilungia

= Hoilungea =

Order of placozoans

Hoilungea is a recently created placozoan order comprising Cladtertia, Hoilungia, and other yet-undescribed species. Named in 2022, it is believed to be sister to Cladhexea, and corresponds to Clades III, IV, V and VII of the literature.
