= R. D. R. Hill =

West Indian cricket umpire

Umpiring information
- Tests umpired: 1 (1930)
- Source: Cricinfo, 7 July 2013

R. D. R. Hill was a West Indian cricket umpire. He stood in one Test match, West Indies vs. England, in 1930.

== See also ==
- List of Test cricket umpires
