= Kory Stamper =

American lexicographer and writer

- Education: Smith College
- Occupations: Lexicographer, editor
- Notable work: Word by Word: The Secret Life of Dictionaries (2017)
- Website: Harmlessdrudgery.com

Kory Stamper is a lexicographer and former associate editor for the Merriam-Webster family of dictionaries. She is the author of Word by Word: The Secret Life of Dictionaries (Pantheon, 2017) and True Color: The Strange and Spectacular Quest to Define Color – From Azure to Zinc Pink (Penguin Random House, 2026).

== Early life ==
Stamper grew up in Colorado. She attended Smith College, where she undertook an interdisciplinary major that involved studying Latin, Greek, Norse, Old English, and Middle English after enrolling in a course on Icelandic family sagas of the 13th and 14th centuries. She says, "I loved the style, the rhythm. They're very bleak, but they have this black humor."

== Career ==
Stamper worked in a college development office before applying for an editorial assistant position with Merriam-Webster in 1998. She left Merriam-Webster after working there for nearly 20 years. She was associate editor at Merriam-Webster for more than ten years. As of 2019, Stamper worked freelance with Cambridge University Press. As of December 2023, she was senior editor of lexicography at Dictionary.com, where she worked until April 2024.

In addition to her editorial duties, she presented many of Merriam-Webster's "Ask the Editor" videos, a series on the publisher's website and YouTube that discusses the English language, especially unusual or controversial words and usages. She undertook speaking engagements on behalf of Merriam-Webster and provides expert advice and response to general enquiries on language and lexicography from the public. Stamper drew attention as the associate editor responsible for explaining the addition of the term "F-bomb" into the dictionary.

Stamper also provides lexicographical and language-related commentary for various media outlets including the Chicago Tribune and has written on other, non-language-related topics.

External videos
- Presentation by Stamper on Word by Word, March 22, 2018, C-SPAN

Stamper's first book, Word by Word: The Secret Life of Dictionaries, was released by Pantheon in March 2017.

Stamper appears in all six episodes of the 2021 Netflix series History of Swear Words, providing commentary on the linguistic histories of various obscenities. The Hollywood Reporter described Stamper as "probably the breakout among the expert talking heads".

Stamper's second book, True Color: The Strange and Spectacular Quest to Define Color – From Azure to Zinc Pink, was released by Penguin Random House in March 2026.

== Personal life ==
Stamper is married and has two children. She lives in Collingswood, New Jersey.

== Works ==
- Word by Word: The Secret Life of Dictionaries, Pantheon, 2017. ISBN 978-1101870945
- True Color: The Strange and Spectacular Quest to Define Color – From Azure to Zinc Pink, Penguin Random House 2026. ISBN 978-1524733032
