= Mervyn Grell =

West Indian cricketer

Personal information
- Full name: Mervyn George Grell
- Born: 18 December 1899; Trinidad
- Died: 11 January 1976 (aged 76); Cocorite, Port-of-Spain, Trinidad
- Batting: Right-handed
- Bowling: Right-arm medium

International information
- National side: West Indies
- Only Test (cap 24): 1 February 1930 v England

Career statistics
Competition	Tests	First-class
Matches	1	10
Runs scored	34	489
Batting average	17.00	28.76
100s/50s	0/0	0/4
Top score	21	74*
Balls bowled	30	360
Wickets	0	5
Bowling average	–	34.39
5 wickets in innings	0	0
10 wickets in match	0	0
Best bowling	–	2/14
Catches/stumpings	1/0	3/0
- Source: Cricinfo, 31 May 2023

Mervyn George Grell (18 December 1899 – 11 January 1976) was a West Indian cricketer who played in one Test in 1930.

Mervyn Grell served with the Honourable Artillery Company in Italy during World War I, and with the Local Trinidad Regiment in World War II.

A hard-hitting lower-order batsman and a medium-pace bowler, Grell played only a handful of first-class matches between 1930 and 1937. The first two were for Trinidad against the visiting MCC in 1929–30. On his debut, played at Port-of-Spain in January 1930, he scored 40 and 54 batting at number 9 and 8 respectively; he top-scored in Trinidad's first innings and was their second-highest scorer in the second. He also took the wickets of Nigel Haig and Les Townsend in the visitors' second innings, both players caught by wicketkeeper Errol Hunte. In his second match a few days later, also against MCC in Port-of-Spain, Grell was asked to captain Trinidad, and followed a duck in the first innings with the top score of the match in the second, 34 not out, when he led a rearguard action that almost brought victory.

On the basis of his three good scores against the English team, and because he lived in Port-of Spain, Grell was selected to play in the Second Test against England, played at Port-of-Spain in February 1930. He scored 21 and 13 in West Indies' defeat.

In all first-class matches, Grell recorded his highest score, 74 not out, in his last, played at Bourda, Georgetown, against British Guiana in 1937.

Grell was also an international football referee.
