= Life: An Idiot's Guide =

- Genre: Comedy
- Presented by: Stephen K. Amos
- Country of origin: United Kingdom
- Original language: English
- No. of series: 3
- No. of episodes: 4

Production
- Producer: Colin Anderson
- Running time: 30 minutes

Original release
- Network: BBC Radio 4
- Release: 7 March 2012 – present

Life: An Idiot's Guide is a comedy show hosted by Stephen K. Amos. It started airing on BBC Radio 4 in March 2012.

== Format ==
Stephen K Amos and his pick of the circuit's best stand-ups build an idiot's guide to life.

== Episodes ==
=== Series 1 ===
Episode	Air date	Guests
1	7 March 2012	Sara Pascoe, Matt Forde, Carey Marx, David O'Doherty
2	14 March 2012	
3	21 March 2012	
4	28 March 2012	
