= Cladhexea =

Scientific classification
- Domain: Eukaryota
- Kingdom: Animalia
- Phylum: Placozoa
- Class: Uniplacotomia
- Order: Cladhexea; Tessler et al., 2022

Order of placozoans

Cladhexea is a recently created placozoan order comprising yet-undescribed species. Named in 2022, it is believed to be sister to Hoilungea, and corresponds to Clade VI of the literature.

== Etymology ==
The name comes from Ancient Greek kládos (clade) and hexa (six), referring to its specimens previously being assigned to placozoan Clade VI in literature.
