= Karl Gottlieb Grell =

German zoologist and protistologist

- Born: December 28, 1912; Burg an der Wupper
- Died: October 4, 1994 (aged 81)
- Known for: research on Trichoplax, foraminifera
- Scientific career
- Fields: protozoology, zoology, marine biology
- Institutions: University of Tübingen

Karl Gottlieb Grell (28 December 1912, Burg an der Wupper – 4 October 1994) was a German zoologist and protistologist, known for his work on Trichoplax.

Karl Grell received his doctorate (Promotion) in 1934 from the University of Bonn, for a dissertation on the digestive tract of the common scorpionfly (Panorpa communis). Subsequently, he worked primarily on unicellular eukaryotes and the metazoan Placozoa. During World War II, he was assigned to an anti-malarial unit in southeast Europe.

After the war he returned to Bonn and started to work on nuclear dimorphism in ciliates. In 1954, with the help of the Rockefeller Foundation, he visited the laboratories of T.M. Sonneborn and L.R. Cleveland. Back in Germany Professor Grell became a coworker of Max Hartmann at the Max-Planck-Institute for Biology in Tuebingen.

— International Society for Evolutionary Protistology Email Newsletter, 8 February 1995

At the University of Tübingen, Grell was a professor of zoology, teaching protozoology and genetics. He led excursions to study marine protozoa.

Grell authored a German-language textbook on protozoology, Protozoologie (1st edition 1956, 2nd ed. 1968), published in English as Protozoology in 1973. From 1959 to 1983 he was a co-editor for the Archiv for Protistenkunde. In addition to his work on Trichoplax, he was known for his research on life cycles of the Foraminifera.

He was elected as an honorary member of the German Society for Protozoology in 1982, and was an Honorary President of the IX International Congress of Protozoology in Berlin in 1993.
