= Enos Knibbs =

West Indian cricket umpire (1886–1953)

Personal information
- Full name: Enos Silvester Knibbs
- Born: 29 July 1886; Kingston, Jamaica
- Died: 2 November 1953 (aged 67); Jamaica

Umpiring information
- Tests umpired: 2 (1930–1935)
- Source: Cricinfo, 28 April 2020

Enos Silvester Knibbs (29 July 1886 – 2 November 1953) was a West Indian cricket umpire from Jamaica. He stood in two Test matches, in 1930 and 1935.

Knibbs was born in Kingston and began his involvement in cricket as a groundsman at the Melbourne Park ground. He apparently devoted himself to cricket – playing, coaching, repairing bats, umpiring and preparing pitches. The Kingston Daily Gleaner said of his umpiring in 1932 that he was "conscientious, painstaking, intelligent and thoroughly honest in his convictions ... and when he gives a decision, it comes from a cool, calculated and well-balanced mind".

Knibbs umpired most of the first-class matches in Jamaica from 1927 to 1938, including the first two Test matches played in Jamaica. The English Test player Errol Holmes said of him, "Enos Nibbs [sic] was as impartial an umpire as I have ever seen." Knibbs used to smoke a cigarette while standing at square leg, extinguish it before officiating at the bowler's end, then re-light it when he returned to square leg.

== See also ==
- List of Test cricket umpires
