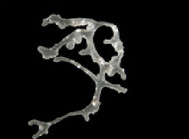
- Polyplacotoma mediterranea

Scientific classification
- Kingdom: Animalia
- Phylum: Placozoa
- Class: Polyplacotomia
- Order: Polyplacotomea; Tessler et al., 2022
- Family: Polyplacotomidae; Tessler et al., 2022
- Genus: Polyplacotoma; Osigus et al., 2019
- Species: P. mediterranea

Binomial name
- Polyplacotoma mediterranea Osigus et al., 2019

= Polyplacotoma =

Species of placozoa

Polyplacotoma mediterranea is a species in the phylum Placozoa, only representative of the genus Polyplacotoma, and was discovered in the Mediterranean Sea. They differ greatly from other species of placozoans with regards to their morphology and genetic makeup, and have been ranked in the separate class Polyplacotomia. P. mediterranea has the smallest mitogenome, the lowest GC content, and the smallest intergenic spacer regions of all placozoans. Their bodily structure consists of elongated polytomous body branches, as well as a maximum size that is greater than 10 mm in length. They have also been observed having a diet of algae. The mitochondrial genome of Polyplacotoma mediterranea is also very compact and contains overlapping protein and tRNA gene codes.

P. mediterranea exhibits significant genetic differences compared to other placozoans. Ancestral state reconstructions of gene content show that P. mediterranea does not have 600 orthologs that are found within all other analyzed placozoans. It also has 76 uniquely present genes and 600 uniquely missing genes compared to other placozoans. P. mediterranea has a mitochondrial genome that is just over half the size (~23,000 bp) of Trichoplax adhaerens, which is more typical for other metazoa.
