= History of Swear Words =

American documentary series

- Genre: Documentary series Blue comedy
- Written by: Joel Boyd; Sara Schaefer
- Presented by: Nicolas Cage
- Theme music composer: Adam Blau
- Country of origin: United States
- Original language: English
- No. of seasons: 1
- No. of episodes: 6

Production
- Executive producers: Brien Meagher; Rhett Bachner; Mike Farah; Joe Farrell; Beth Belew; Bellamie Blackstone
- Producer: Ben Stoddard
- Running time: 20 minutes
- Production companies: B17 Entertainment; Funny or Die; Saturn Films

Original release
- Network: Netflix
- Release: January 5, 2021

History of Swear Words is an American documentary series hosted by Nicolas Cage. The series was released on January 5, 2021, on Netflix.

== Premise ==
Hosted by Nicolas Cage, the unscripted series explores the History of Swear Words through interviews with experts in etymology, popular culture, history and entertainment, with each episode diving into the origins, usage and cultural impact of specific curse words: fuck, shit, bitch, dick, pussy and damn.

== Cast ==
- Nicolas Cage as Host
- Jess Harnell as Grandpa

=== Entertainers ===
- Sarah Silverman
- Nick Offerman
- Nikki Glaser
- Patti Harrison
- Open Mike Eagle
- Joel Kim Booster
- DeRay Davis
- London Hughes
- Jim Jefferies
- Zainab Johnson
- Baron Vaughn
- Isiah Whitlock Jr.

=== Experts ===
- Benjamin K. Bergen – Professor of Cognitive science at the University of California, San Diego
- Anne H. Charity Hudley – Linguist, Professor of African-American English at the University of California, Santa Barbara
- Mireille Miller-Young – Professor of Women's studies at the University of California, Santa Barbara
- Elvis Mitchell – Film critic
- Melissa Mohr – Author of Holy Sh*t: A Brief History of Swearing
- Kory Stamper – Author of Word by Word: The Secret Life of Dictionaries, Lexicographer, and former editor for Merriam-Webster

== Episodes ==
No.	Title	Original release date
1	"F**k"	January 5, 2021
2	"Sh*t"	January 5, 2021
3	"Bitch"	January 5, 2021
4	"D**k"	January 5, 2021
5	"Pu**y"	January 5, 2021
6	"Damn"	January 5, 2021

== Production ==
On December 9, 2020, it was announced that Nicolas Cage would host an unscripted six-episode series about the history of swear words for Netflix.

The series has been produced by Bellamie Blackstone, Mike Farah, Joe Farrell, and Beth Belew for Funny or Die, with Brien Meagher and Rhett Bachner for Industrial Media's B17 Entertainment respectively. Blackstone will also serve as the series showrunner.

== Reception ==
On Rotten Tomatoes, the series holds an approval rating of 70% based on 27 reviews, with an average rating of 6.40/10. The website's critics consensus reads, "Brevity may be the soul of wit, but digging a little deeper could only help History of Swear Words — a show that almost lives up to its name and host, but falls a little f-king short." On Metacritic, it has a weighted average score of 62 out of 100 based on 14 reviews, indicating "generally favorable reviews".

Richard Roeper of Chicago Sun-Times gave the series three out of four stars and described it as "a cheeky, entertaining and legitimately educational look at the etymology of the most common curse words."

== See also ==
- Seven dirty words
