= Errol Hunte =

Trinidadian cricketer

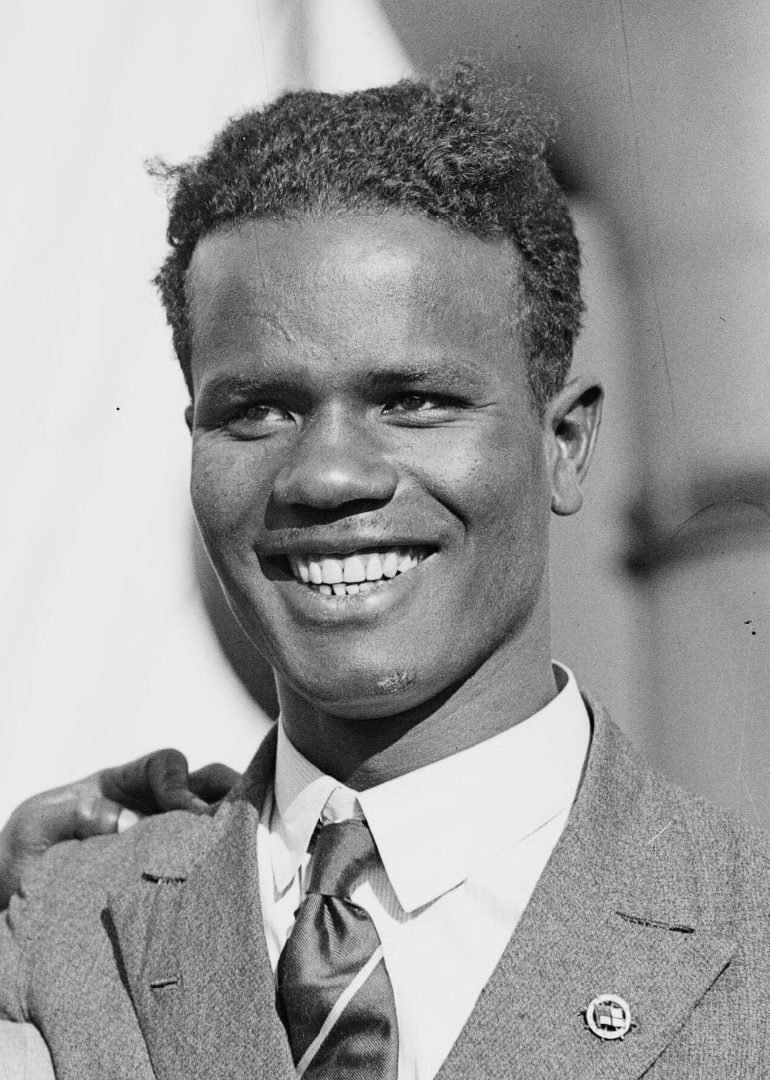

Personal information
- Full name: Errol Ashton Clairmore Hunte
- Born: 3 October 1905; Port of Spain, Trinidad and Tobago
- Died: 26 June 1961 (aged 55); Port of Spain, Trinidad and Tobago
- Batting: Right-handed
- Role: Wicket-keeper

International information
- National side: West Indies
- Test debut (cap 18): 11 January 1930 v England
- Last Test: 21 February 1930 v England

Domestic team information
- Years: Team
- 1928–1934: Trinidad

Career statistics
Competition	Tests	First-class
Matches	3	15
Runs scored	166	472
Batting average	33.20	20.52
100s/50s	0/2	0/3
Top score	58	58
Catches/stumpings	5/0	29/7
- Source: Cricket Archive, 26 October 2010

Errol Ashton Clairmore Hunte (October 3, 1905, Port of Spain, Trinidad – June 26, 1967, Port of Spain, Trinidad) was a Trinidadian cricketer who played in three Tests for the West Indies in 1930.
