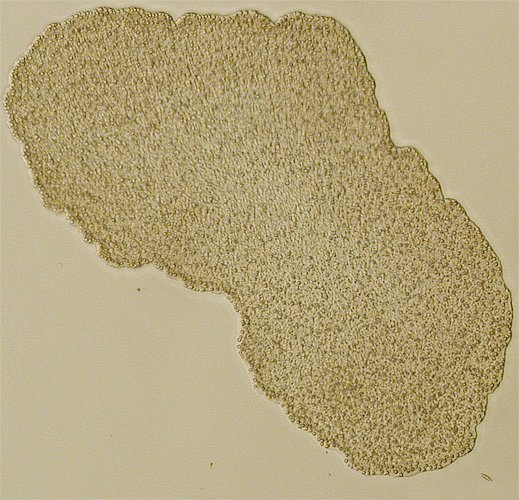
- Light microscope image of Trichoplax (specimen ca. 0.5 mm across)

Scientific classification
- Kingdom: Animalia
- Phylum: Placozoa
- Class: Uniplacotomia; Tessler et al., 2022
- Order: Trichoplacea; Bütschli & Hatschek, 1905
- Family: Trichoplacidae; Schulze, 1883
- Genus: Trichoplax; Schulze, 1883

= Trichoplax =

Genus of Placozoa

Trichoplax is a genus placed in the phylum Placozoa. The species Trichoplax adhaerens is one of four Placozoa species, alongside Hoilungia hongkongensis, Polyplacotoma mediterranea and Cladtertia collaboinventa. Placozoa is a basal group of multicellular animals, possible relatives of Cnidaria. Trichoplax are very flat organisms commonly less than 4 mm in diameter, lacking any organs or internal structures. They have two cellular layers: the top epitheloid layer is made of ciliated "cover cells" flattened toward the outside of the organism, and the bottom layer is made up of cylinder cells that possess cilia used in locomotion, and gland cells that lack cilia. Between these layers is the fibre syncytium, a liquid-filled cavity strutted open by star-like fibres.

Trichoplax feed by absorbing food particles—mainly microbes—with their underside. They generally reproduce asexually by dividing or budding, but can also reproduce sexually. Though Trichoplax has a small genome in comparison to other animals, nearly 87% of its 11,514 predicted protein-coding genes are identifiably similar to known genes in other animals.

== Discovery ==
Trichoplax was discovered in 1883 by the German zoologist Franz Eilhard Schulze, in a seawater aquarium at the Zoological Institute in Graz, Austria. The generic name is derived from the classical Greek θρίξ (thrix), "hair", and πλάξ (plax), "plate". The specific epithet adhaerens is Latin meaning "adherent", reflecting its propensity to stick to the glass slides and pipettes used in its examination.

Although from the very beginning most researchers who studied Trichoplax in any detail realized that it had no close relationship to other animal phyla, the zoologist Thilo Krumbach published a hypothesis that Trichoplax is a form of the planula larva of the anemone-like hydrozoan Eleutheria krohni in 1907. Although this was refuted in print by Schulze and others, Krumbach's analysis became the standard textbook explanation, and nothing was printed in zoological journals about Trichoplax until the 1960s. In the 1960s and 1970s a new interest among researchers led to acceptance of Placozoa as a new animal phylum. Among the new discoveries was study of the early phases of the animals' embryonic development and evidence that the animals that people had been studying are adults, not larvae. This newfound interest also included study of the organism in nature (as opposed to aquariums).

== Morphology ==
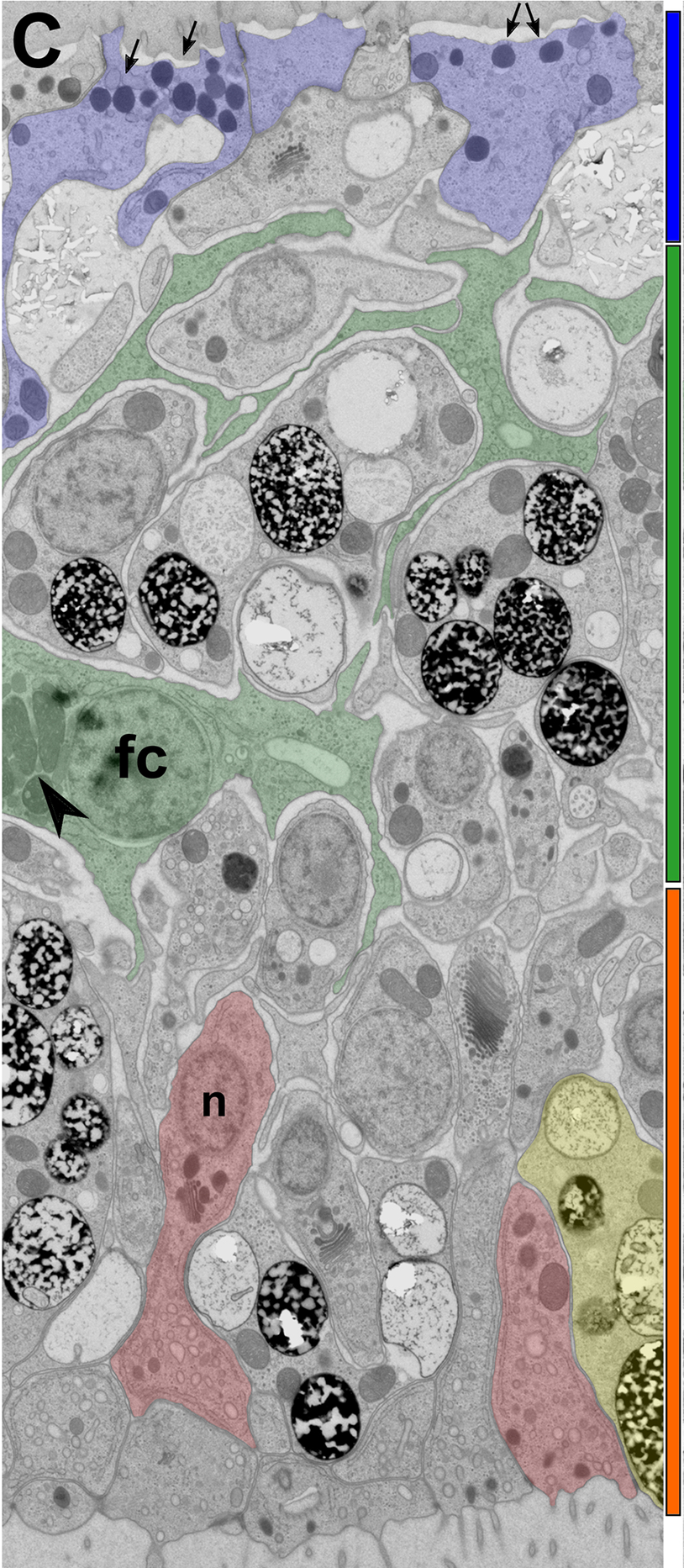
Ultrastructure of Trichoplax adhaerens. The upper epithelium (blue bar) with monociliated cells (light blue). The intermediate layer (green bar) consists of nonciliated fiber cells (labeled "fc" in light green). The lower epithelium (orange bar) is mostly made up of monociliated cylinder cells (light red). Scale bar is 2 μm.

Trichoplax generally has a thinly flattened, plate-like body in cross-section around half a millimetre, occasionally up to two or three millimetres. The body is usually only about 25 μm thick. Because they are so thin and fragile, and because the cilia which they use for locomotion are only loosely coordinated, they are constantly being split into two or three separate clones when their cilia moves in opposite directions, causing microfractures in the animal's epithelium. One hypothesis is that the larger a motile animal lacking a nervous system is, the less coordinated its locomotion becomes, placing an upper limit on their possible size. These colorlessly gray organisms are so thin they are transparent when illuminated from behind, and in most cases are barely visible to the naked eye. Like the single-celled amoebae, which they superficially resemble, they continually change their external shape. In addition, spherical phases occasionally form. These may facilitate movement to new habitats.

Trichoplax lacks tissues and organs; there is also no manifest body symmetry, so it is not possible to distinguish anterior from posterior or left from right. It is made up of a few thousand cells of six types in three distinct layers: dorsal epithelia cells and ventral epithelia cells, each with a single cilium ("monociliate"), ventral gland cells, syncytial fiber cells, lipophils, and crystal cells (each containing a birefringent crystal, arrayed around the rim). Lacking sensory and muscle cells, it moves using cilia on its external surface. The collective movements of the cilia are completely coordinated by mechanical interactions.

== Signal processing ==
There are no neurons present, but in the absence of a nervous system the animal uses short chains of amino acids known as peptides for cell communication, in a manner resembling the way animals with neurons use neuropeptides for the same purpose. These specialized cells are called peptidergic cells. Unlike neurons, the cells do not use electrical impulses and their messaging is restricted to sending signals to other nearby cells, as they are unable to both send and receive signals. Individual cells contain and secrete a variety of small peptides, made up of between four and 20 amino acids, which are detected by neighbouring cells. Each peptide can be used individually to send a signal to other cells, but also sequentially or together in different combinations, creating a huge number a different types of signals. This allows for a relatively complex behavioural repertoire, including behaviours such as "crinkling", turning, flattening, and internal "churning". The genome of Trichoplax codes for eighty-five neurotransmitter receptors, more than in any other sequenced animal.

== Epitheloid ==
Both structurally and functionally, it is possible to distinguish a back or dorsal side from a belly or ventral side in Trichoplax adhaerens. Both consist of a single layer of cells coated on the outside with slime and are reminiscent of epithelial tissue, primarily due to the junctions—belt desmosomes—between the cells. In contrast to true epithelium, however, the cell layers of the Placozoa possess no basal lamina, which refers to a thin layer of extracellular material underlying epithelium that stiffens it and separates it from the body's interior. The absence of this structure, which is otherwise to be found in all animals except the sponges, can be explained in terms of function: a rigid separating layer would make the amoeboid changes in the shape of Trichoplax adhaerens impossible. Instead of an epithelium, Placozoa species have an epitheloid.

A mature individual consists of up to a thousand cells that can be divided into four different cell types. The monociliated cells of the dorsal epitheloid are flattened and contain lipid bodies. The cells on the ventral side likewise possess a single cilium, while their elongated columnar shape, with a small cross section at the surface, packs them very closely together, causing the cilia to be very closely spaced on the ventral side and to form a ciliated "crawling sole". Interspersed among these ventral epithlioid cells are unciliated gland cells thought to be capable of synthesizing digestive enzymes.

== Fibre syncytium ==
Between the two layers of cells is a liquid-filled interior space, which, except for the immediate zones of contact with the ventral and dorsal sides, is pervaded by a star-shaped fibre syncytium: a fibrous network that consists essentially of a single cell but contains numerous nuclei that, while separated by internal crosswalls (septa), do not have true cell membranes between them. Similar structures are also found in the sponges (Porifera) and many fungi.

On both sides of the septa are liquid-filled capsules that cause the septa to resemble synapses, i.e. nerve-cell junctions that occur in fully expressed form only in animals with tissues (Eumetazoa). Striking accumulations of calcium ions, which may have a function related to the propagation of stimuli, likewise suggest a possible role as protosynapses. This view is supported by the fact that fluorescent antibodies against cnidarian neurotransmitters, i.e. precisely those signal carriers that are transferred in synapses, bind in high concentrations in certain cells of Trichoplax adhaerens, and thus indicate the existence of comparable substances in the Placozoa. The fibre syncytium also contains molecules of actin and probably also of myosin, which occur in the muscle cells of eumetazoans. In the placozoans, they ensure that the individual fibres can relax or contract and thus help determine the animals' shape.

In this way, the fibre syncytium assumes the functions of nerve and muscle tissues. Moreover, at least a portion of digestion occurs here. On the other hand, no gelatinous extracellular matrix exists of the kind observed, in mesoglea, in cnidarians and ctenophores.

Pluripotent cells, which can differentiate into other cell types, have not yet been demonstrated unambiguously in T. adhaerens, in contrast to the case of the Eumetazoa. The conventional view is that dorsal and ventral epithelioid cells arise only from other cells of the same type.

== Genetics ==
The Trichoplax genome contains about 98 million base pairs and 11,514 predicted protein-coding genes.

All nuclei of placozoan cells contain six pairs of chromosomes that are only about two to three micrometres in size. Three pairs are metacentric, meaning that the centromere, the attachment point for the spindle fibers in cell division, is located at the center, or acrocentric, with the centromere at an extreme end of each chromosome. The cells of the fiber syncytium can be tetraploid, i.e. contain a quadruple complement of chromosomes.

A single complement of chromosomes in Trichoplax adhaerens contains a total of fewer than fifty million base pairs and thus forms the smallest animal genome; the number of base pairs in the intestinal bacterium Escherichia coli is smaller by a factor of only ten.

The genetic complement of Trichoplax adhaerens has not yet been very well researched; it has, however, already been possible to identify several genes, such as Brachyury and TBX2/TBX3, which are homologous to corresponding base-pair sequences in eumetazoans. Of particular significance is Trox-2, a placozoan gene known under the name Cnox-2 in cnidarians and as Gsx in the bilaterally symmetrical Bilateria. As a homeobox or Hox gene it plays a role in organization and differentiation along the axis of symmetry in the embryonic development of eumetazoans; in cnidarians, it appears to determine the position of mouth-facing (oral) and opposite-facing (aboral) sides of the organism. Since placozoans possess no axes of symmetry, exactly where the gene is transcribed in the body of Trichoplax is of special interest. Antibody studies have been able to show that the gene's product occurs only in the transition zones of the dorsal and ventral sides, perhaps in a fifth cell type that has not yet been characterized. It is not yet clear whether these cells, contrary to traditional views, are stem cells, which play a role in cell differentiation. In any case, Trox-2 can be considered a possible candidate for a proto-Hox gene, from which the other genes in this important family could have arisen through gene duplication and variation.

Initially, molecular-biology methods were applied unsuccessfully to test the various theories regarding Placozoa's position in the Metazoa system. No clarification was achieved with standard markers such as 18S rDNA/RNA: the marker sequence was apparently "garbled", i.e. rendered uninformative as the result of many mutations. Nevertheless, this negative result supported the suspicion that Trichoplax might represent an extremely primitive lineage of metazoans, since a very long period of time had to be assumed for the accumulation of so many mutations.

Of the 11,514 genes identified in the six chromosomes of Trichoplax, 87% are identifiably similar to genes in cnidarians and bilaterians. In those Trichoplax genes for which equivalent genes can be identified in the human genome, over 80% of the introns (the regions within genes that are removed from RNA molecules before their sequences are translated in protein synthesis) are found in the same location as in the corresponding human genes. The arrangement of genes in groups on chromosomes is also conserved between the Trichoplax and human genomes. This contrasts to other model systems such as fruit flies and soil nematodes that have experienced a paring down of non-coding regions and a loss of the ancestral genome organizations.

== Relationship with animals ==
The phylogenetic relationship between Trichoplax and other animals has been debated for some time. A variety of hypotheses have been advanced based on the few morphological characteristics of this simple organism that could be identified. More recently, a comparison of the Trichoplax mitochondrial genome suggested that Trichoplax is a basal metazoan—less closely related to all other animals including sponges than they are to each other. This implies that the Placozoa would have arisen relatively soon after the evolutionary transition from unicellular to multicellular forms. But an even more recent analysis of the much larger Trichoplax nuclear genome instead supports the hypothesis that Trichoplax is a basal eumetazoan, that is, more closely related to Cnidaria and other animals than any of those animals are to sponges. This is consistent with the presence in Trichoplax of cell layers reminiscent of epithelial tissue (see above).

== Distribution and habitat ==
Trichoplax was first discovered on the walls of a marine aquarium, and is rarely observed in its natural habitat. Trichoplax has been collected, among other places, in the Red Sea, the Mediterranean, and the Caribbean, off Hawaii, Guam, Samoa, Japan, Vietnam, Brazil, and Papua New Guinea, and on the Great Barrier Reef off the east coast of Australia.

Field specimens tend to be found in the coastal tidal zones of tropical and subtropical seas, on such substrates as the trunks and roots of mangroves, shells of molluscs, fragments of stony corals or simply on pieces of rock. One study was able to detect seasonal population fluctuations, the causes of which have not yet been deduced.

== Feeding and symbionts ==
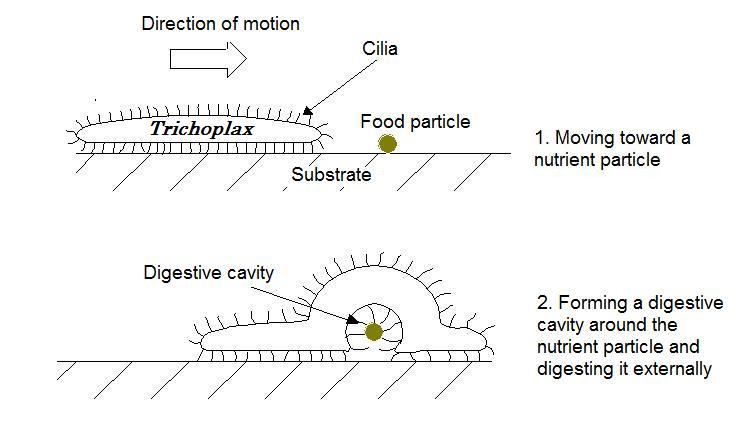
Extracorporeal food uptake by Trichoplax adhaerens

Trichoplax adhaerens feeds on small algae, particularly on green algae (Chlorophyta) of the genus Chlorella, cryptomonads (Cryptophyta) of the genera Cryptomonas and Rhodomonas, and blue-green bacteria (Cyanobacteria) such as Phormidium inundatum, but also on detritus from other organisms. In feeding, one or several small pockets form around particles of nutrients on the ventral side, into which digestive enzymes are released by the gland cells; the organisms thus develop a temporary "external stomach", so to speak. The enclosed nutrients are then taken up by pinocytosis ("cell-drinking") by the ciliated cells located on the ventral surface.

Entire single-celled organisms can also be ingested through the upper epitheloid (that is, the "dorsal surface" of the animal). This mode of feeding could be unique in the animal kingdom: the particles, collected in a slime layer, are drawn through the intercellular gaps (cellular interstices) of the epitheloid by the fibre cells and then digested by phagocytosis ("cell-eating"). Such "collecting" of nutrient particles through an intact tegument is only possible because some "insulating" elements (specifically, a basal lamina under the epitheloid and certain types of cell-cell junctions) are not present in the Placozoa.

When the concentrations of algae are high the animals are more likely to engage in social feeding behavior.

Not all bacteria in the interior of Placozoa are digested as food: in the endoplasmic reticulum, an organelle of the fibre syncytium, bacteria are frequently found that appear to live in symbiosis with Trichoplax adhaerens. These endosymbionts, which are no longer able to survive outside its host, are transferred from one generation to the next through both vegetative and sexual reproduction.

== Locomotion ==
Trichoplax movement

Placozoa can move in two different ways on solid surfaces: first, their ciliated crawling sole lets them glide slowly across the substrate; second, they can change location by modifying their body shape, as an amoeba does. These movements are not centrally coordinated, since no muscle or nerve tissues exist. It can happen that an individual moves simultaneously in two different directions and consequently divides into two parts.

It has been possible to demonstrate a close connection between body shape and the speed of locomotion, which is also a function of available food:

- At low nutrient density, the spread-out area fluctuates slightly but irregularly; speed remains relatively constant at about 15 micrometres per second.
- If nutrient density is high, however, the area covered oscillates with a stable period of about 8 minutes, in which the greatest extent reached by the organism can be as much as twice the smallest. Its speed, which remains consistently below 5 micrometres per second, varies with the same period. In this case, a high speed always corresponds to a reduced area, and vice versa.

Since the transition is not smooth but happens abruptly, the two modes of extension can be very clearly separated from one another. The following is a qualitative explanation of the animal's behavior:

- At low nutrient density, Trichoplax maintains a constant speed in order to uncover food sources without wasting time.
- Once such a source is identified by high nutrient density, the organism increases its area in regular increments and thereby enlarges the surface in contact with substrate. This enlarges the surface through which nutrients can be ingested. The animal reduces its speed at the same time in order to actually consume all of the available food.
- Once this is nearly completed, Trichoplax reduces its area again to move on. Because food sources such as algal mats are often relatively extensive, it is reasonable for such an animal to stop moving after a brief period in order to flatten out again and absorb nutrients. Thus Trichoplax progresses relatively slowly in this phase.

The actual direction in which Trichoplax moves each time is random: if we measure how fast an individual animal moves away from an arbitrary starting point, we find a linear relationship between elapsed time and mean square distance between starting point and present location. Such a relationship is also characteristic of random Brownian motion of molecules, which thus can serve as a model for locomotion in the Placozoa.

Small animals are also capable of swimming actively with the aid of their cilia. As soon as they come into contact with a possible substrate, a dorsoventral response occurs: the dorsal cilia continue to beat, whereas the cilia of ventral cells stop their rhythmic beating. At the same time, the ventral surface tries to make contact with the substrate; small protrusions and invaginations, the microvilli found on the surface of the columnar cells, help in attaching to the substrate via their adhesive action.

Using T. adhaerens as a model, 0.02–0.002 Hz oscillations in locomotory and feeding patterns were observed, and taken as evidence of complex multicellular integration, dependent on endogenous secretion of signal molecules. Evolutionarily conserved low-molecular-weight transmitters (glutamate, aspartate, glycine, GABA, and ATP) acted as coordinators of distinct locomotory and feeding patterns. Specifically, L-glutamate induced and partially mimicked endogenous feeding cycles, whereas glycine and GABA suppressed feeding. ATP-modified feeding is complex, first causing feeding-like cycles and then suppressing feeding. Trichoplax locomotion was modulated by glycine, GABA, and, surprisingly, by animals' own mucus trails. Mucus triples locomotory speed compared to clean substrates. Glycine and GABA increased the frequency of turns.

== Regeneration ==
A notable characteristic of the Placozoa is that they can regenerate themselves from small fragments, which, however, have to include both edge and central regions. Even when large portions of the organism are removed in the laboratory, a complete animal develops again from the remainder. It is also possible to rub Trichoplax adhaerens through a strainer in such a manner that individual cells are not destroyed but are separated from one another to a large extent. In the test tube they then find their way back together again to form complete organisms. If this procedure is performed on several previously strained individuals simultaneously, the same thing occurs. In this case, however, cells that previously belonged to a particular individual can suddenly show up as part of another.

== Reproduction ==
The Placozoa normally propagate asexually, dividing down the middle to produce two (or sometimes, three) roughly equal-sized daughters. These remain connected by a cellular thread for a while after fission, which breaks when the two daughter cells move in different directions. More rarely, budding processes are observed: spherules of cells separate from the dorsal surface; each of these combines all known cell types and subsequently grows into an individual on its own.

Sexual reproduction is thought to be triggered by excessive population density. As a result, the animals absorb liquid, begin to swell, and separate from the substrate so that they float freely in the water. In the protected interior space, the ventral cells form an ovum surrounded by a special envelope, the fertilisation membrane; the ovum is supplied with nutrients by the surrounding syncytium, allowing energy-rich yolk to accumulate in its interior. Once maturation of the ovum is complete, the rest of the animal degenerates, liberating the ovum itself. Small, unciliated cells that form at the same time are interpreted to be spermatozoa. It has not yet been possible to observe fertilisation itself; the existence of the fertilisation membrane is currently taken to be evidence, however, that it has taken place.

Putative eggs have been observed, but they degrade, typically at the 32–64 cell stage. Neither embryonic development nor sperm have been observed. Despite lack of observation of sexual reproduction in the lab, the genetic structure of the populations in the wild is compatible with the sexual reproduction mode, at least for species of the analysed genotype H5.

Usually even before its liberation, the ovum initiates cleavage processes in which it becomes completely pinched through at the middle. A ball of cells characteristic of animals, the blastula, is ultimately produced in this manner, with a maximum of 256 cells. Development beyond this 256-cell stage has not yet been observed.

Trichoplax lack a homologue of the Boule protein that appears to be ubiquitous and conserved in males of all species of other animals tested. If its absence implies the species has no males, then perhaps its "sexual" reproduction may be a case of the above-described process of regeneration, combining cells from two separate organisms into one.

Due to the possibility of its cloning itself by asexual propagation without limit, the life span of Placozoa is infinite; in the laboratory, several lines descended from a single organism have been maintained in culture for an average of 20 years without the occurrence of sexual processes.

== Role as a model organism ==
Trichoplax adhaerens is a model organism. In particular, research is needed to determine how a group of cells that cannot be considered full-fledged epithelial tissue organizes itself, how locomotion and coordination occur in the absence of true muscle and nerve tissue, and how the absence of a body axis affects the animal's biology. At the genetic level, the way in which Trichoplax adhaerens protects against damage to its genome needs to be studied, particularly with regard to the existence of special DNA-repair processes. T. adhaerens can tolerate high levels of radiation damage that are lethal to other animals. Tolerance to X-ray exposure was found to depend on expression of genes involved in DNA repair and apoptosis including the gene Mdm2. Complete decoding of the genome should also clarify the placozoans' place in evolution, which continues to be controversial.

Its ability to fight cancer through a combination of aggressive DNA repair and ejection of damaged cells makes it a promising organism for cancer research.

In addition to basic research, this animal could also be suitable for studying wound-healing and regeneration processes; as yet unidentified metabolic products should be researched. Finally, Trichoplax adhaerens is also being considered as an animal model for testing compounds and antibacterial drugs.

The related lineage Trichoplax sp. H2 has been suggested to be a more suitable model organism than T. adhaerens, due to its abundance and ease of culture.

== Systematics ==
Francesco Saverio Monticelli described another species in 1893, which he found in the waters around Naples, naming it Treptoplax reptans. However, it has not been observed since 1896, and most zoologists today doubt its existence.

Significant genetic differences have been observed between collected specimens matching the morphological description of T. adhaerens, leading scientists to suggest in 2004 that it may be a cryptic species complex. At least twenty haplotypes have since been assigned based on the 16S mitochondrial DNA fragment, with T. adhaerens being equated to the lineage H1.

While most haplotypes have not been formally described as species, they have been (with the exception of the morphologically distinct H0, Polyplacotoma mediterranea) provisionally placed into seven distinct clades. The genus Trichoplax was redefined in 2021 as comprising clades I and II, including haplotypes H1, H2, H3 and H17. A 2022 study defined Trichoplax more restrictively as only clade I (haplotypes H1, H2 and H17), with H3 being suggested to belong to a separate undescribed genus in the family Trichoplacidae.

=== Haplotype H2 ===
Placozoan haplotypes are not necessarily equivalent to species, and several haplotypes of the related placozoan genus Hoilungia have been found to belong to the same species. Nonetheless, haplotype H2 is usually considered to be a separate undescribed species, referred to as Trichoplax sp. H2. It has been reported to be more robust and abundant than T. adhaerens, and easier to culture, making it a better fit for experimental research.

Trichoplax sp. H2 also show differences in cell differentiation, having 29 cell types compared to H1's 28 when analyzed using graph-based 2D projections and gene expression patterns. It has a population of "concave-disk" epithelia upper-like cells unique to this haplotype, first described in 2023. It also has an additional "unknown" cell type characterized by β-secretase expression; this type is found in other Placozoans besides H1. Other relatively minor differences make up for the difference in number.

=== Haplotype H17 ===
The genome of H17 has been sequenced. In a gene-content analysis it branches off first as the sister clade of (H1+H2), contrary to earlier rDNA-based reports H2 branching off first as the sister to (H1+H17).

H17 has been imaged using mmunofluorescence imaging.

=== Comparative genomics ===
Comparative genomic studies of Trichoplax adhaerens and the Panama strain of Trichoplax sp. H2 have suggested that their genetic similarity might be due to an interbreeding event having happened in the wild at least several decades ago, with one of them being the result of hybridization between the other and a third unknown strain. Analysis of bacterial endosymbionts supports this as a possible hypothesis, as the endosymbiont found in the Panama strain is closer to the one in T. adhaerens than to the one in the Hawaii strain of Trichoplax sp. H2.
