= Franz Eilhard Schulze =

German anatomist and zoologist

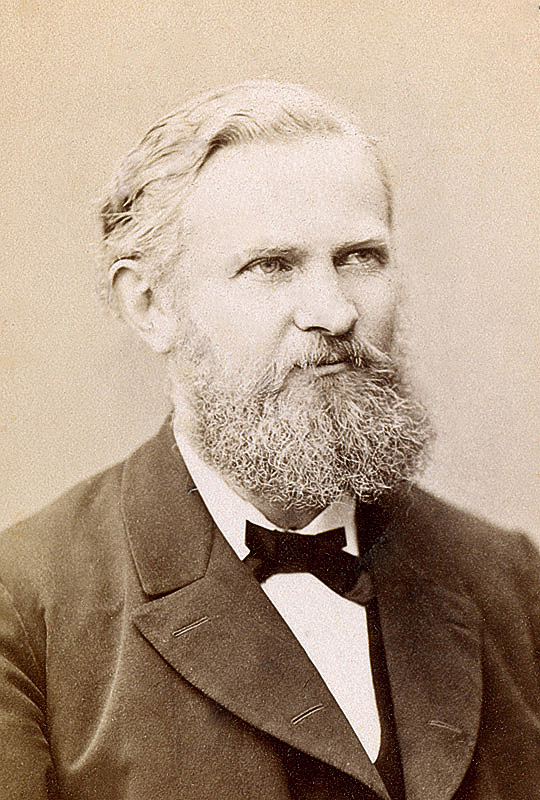
Franz Eilhard Schulze

Franz Eilhard Schulze (22 March 1840 – 2 November 1921) was a German anatomist and zoologist born in Eldena, near Greifswald.

== Biography ==
Schulze studied at the Universities of Bonn and Rostock. In 1863, he received his doctorate from Rostock, where he subsequently became a lecturer of anatomy (1864) and an associate professor of comparative anatomy (1865). In 1871 he established the zoological institute at the University of Rostock. Later on, he served as a professor at the Universities of Graz and Berlin.

In 1872, he took part in the "Pomerania" expedition to the North Sea. For several years during the 1890s, he was president of the German Zoological Society (Deutsche Zoologische Gesellschaft).

He made contributions in his studies on the anatomy and developmental history of invertebrates, in particular, his research and publications in regards to sea-sponges. He was especially interested in a class of sponges known as Hexactinellida, of which he studied from collections taken from the U.S. "Albatross Expedition" and the British "Challenger Expedition" (1873–76). Schulze also conducted important investigations of delicate sponge-like protozoans known as xenophyophores.

In 1883, Schulze was the first to describe Trichoplax adhaerens, one of the most basal multicellular animals and member species of the phylum placozoa.

== Selected works ==
- Amerikanische Hexactinelliden nach dem Materiale der Albatross-Expedition. Jena 1899.
- Hexactinellida. Jena: G. Fischer, 1904.
- Die Xenophyophoren der Siboga-Expedition. Leiden: Brill, 1906.
