= Caulophacus weddelli =

Scientific classification
- Kingdom: Animalia
- Phylum: Porifera
- Class: Hexactinellida
- Order: Lyssacinosida
- Family: Rossellidae
- Genus: Caulophacus
- Species: C. weddelli

Binomial name
- Caulophacus weddelli Janussen, Tabachnick & Tendal, 2004

Species of sponge

Caulophacus weddelli is a species of glass sponges belonging to the subfamily Lanuginellinae. It is the only species in the subgenus Oxydiscus. It is known from a type specimen found in the Weddell Sea, which lends its name to the specific epithet weddelli.
