= Caulophacus brandti =

Scientific classification
- Kingdom: Animalia
- Phylum: Porifera
- Class: Hexactinellida
- Order: Lyssacinosida
- Family: Rossellidae
- Genus: Caulophacus
- Species: C. brandti

Binomial name
- Caulophacus brandti Janussen, Tabachnick & Tendal, 2004

Species of sponge

Caulophacus brandti is a species of glass sponges belonging to the subfamily Lanuginellinae. It is known from type specimens found in the Weddell Sea. The specific epithet was given in honor of Angelika Brandt.
