= Caulophacus discohexactinus =

Scientific classification
- Kingdom: Animalia
- Phylum: Porifera
- Class: Hexactinellida
- Order: Lyssacinosida
- Family: Rossellidae
- Genus: Caulophacus
- Species: C. discohexactinus

Binomial name
- Caulophacus discohexactinus Janussen, Tabachnick & Tendal, 2004

Species of sponge

Caulophacus discohexactinus is a species of glass sponges belonging to the subfamily Lanuginellinae. It is known from a type specimen found in the Weddell Sea. The specific epithet was given to refer to the discohexactine shape of the species' microscleres.
