= Staurocalyptus affinis =

Scientific classification
- Domain: Eukaryota
- Kingdom: Animalia
- Phylum: Porifera
- Class: Hexactinellida
- Order: Lyssacinosida
- Family: Rossellidae
- Genus: Staurocalyptus
- Species: S. affinis

Binomial name
- Staurocalyptus affinis (Iijma, 1904)

Synonyms
- Acanthascus affinis

Species of sponge

Staurocalyptus affinis is a species of marine sponge.

== Distribution ==
The species occurs on North Pacific Ocean.
