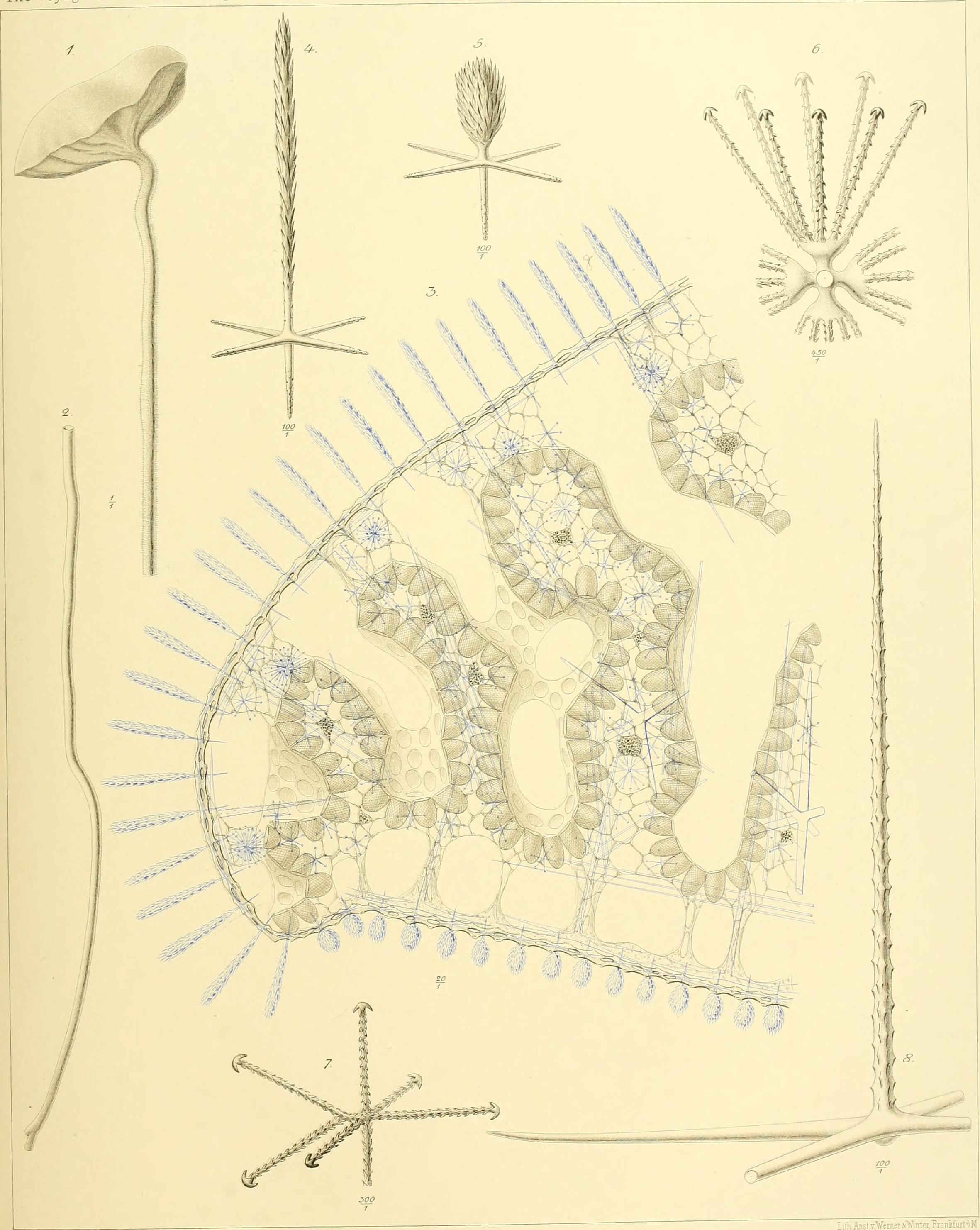
- Caulophacus elegans, illustration in: Report on the scientific results of the voyage of H.M.S. Challenger during the years 1873-76 - under the command of Captain George S. Nares, R.N., F.R.S. and Captain Frank Turle Thomson, R.N. (1887).

Scientific classification
- Domain: Eukaryota
- Kingdom: Animalia
- Phylum: Porifera
- Class: Hexactinellida
- Order: Lyssacinosida
- Family: Rossellidae
- Genus: Caulophacus
- Species: C. elegans

Binomial name
- Caulophacus elegans Schulze, 1886

= Caulophacus elegans =

Species of sponge

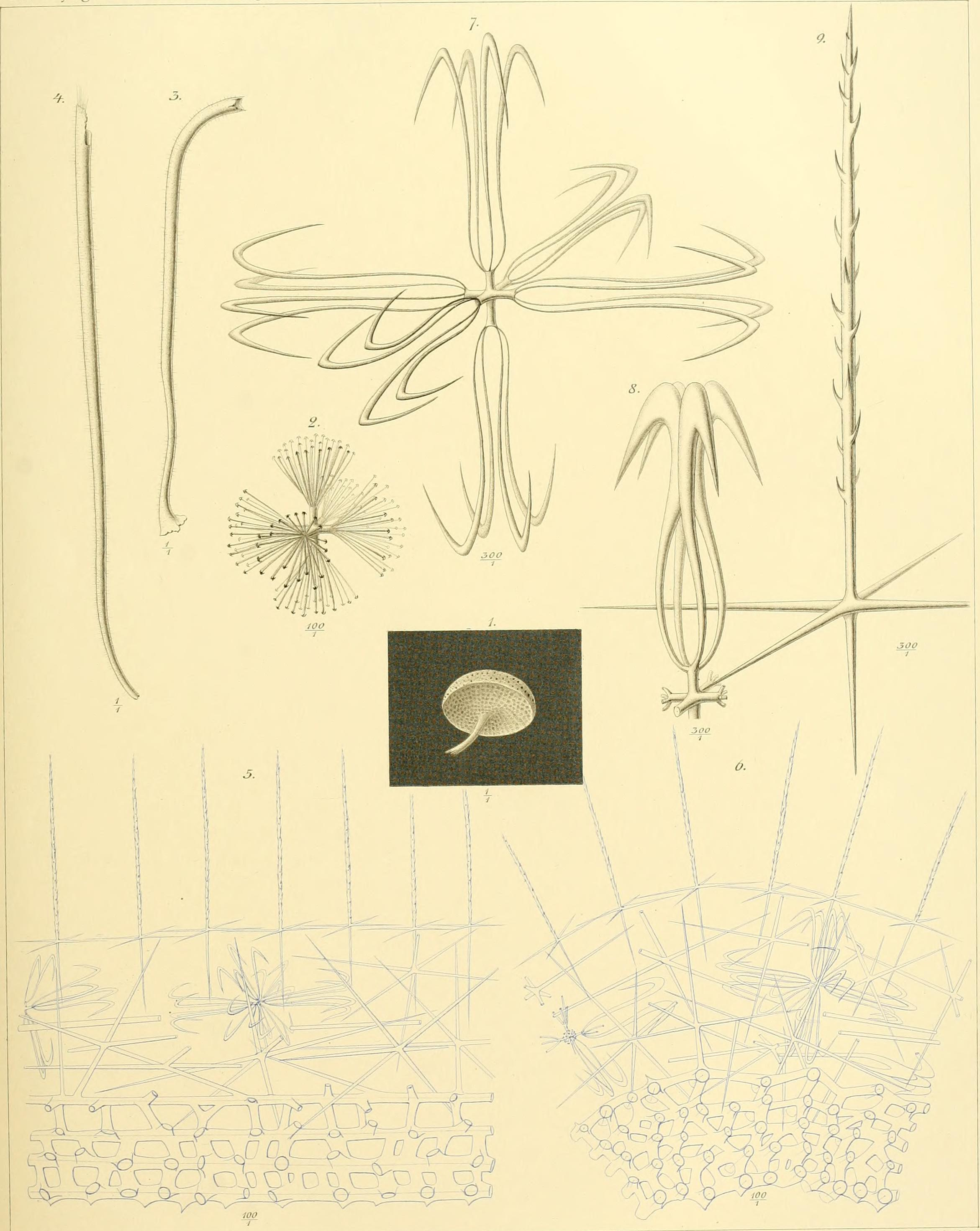
Caulophacus elegans, illustration in: Report on the scientific results of the voyage of H.M.S. Challenger during the years 1873-76 - under the command of Captain George S. Nares, R.N., F.R.S. and Captain Frank Turle Thomson, R.N. (1887).

Caulophacus elegans is a species of glass sponges belonging to the subfamily Lanuginellinae. The type specimen has been found in Central Kuroshio Current, near Japan.
