= Oopsacas olympica =

Scientific classification
- Kingdom: Animalia
- Phylum: Porifera
- Class: Hexactinellida
- Order: Lyssacinosida
- Family: Leucopsacidae
- Genus: Oopsacas
- Species: O. olympica

Binomial name
- Oopsacas olympica Reiswig, 2014

Synonyms
- Oopsacas olympicus Reiswig, 2014

Species of sponge

Oopsacas olympica is a species of sea sponge first found at the bottom of shelf, canyon and seamounts of the west coast of Washington, British Columbia and the Gulf of Alaska.
