= Acanthascus malacus =

Scientific classification
- Kingdom: Animalia
- Phylum: Porifera
- Class: Hexactinellida
- Order: Lyssacinosida
- Family: Rossellidae
- Genus: Acanthascus
- Species: A. malacus

Binomial name
- Acanthascus malacus Reiswig, 2014

Species of sponge

Acanthascus malacus is a species of sponge first found at the bottom of shelf, canyon and seamounts of the west coast of Washington, British Columbia and the Gulf of Alaska.
