= Rossella antarctica =

Scientific classification
- Kingdom: Animalia
- Phylum: Porifera
- Class: Hexactinellida
- Order: Lyssacinosida
- Family: Rossellidae
- Genus: Rossella
- Species: R. antarctica

Binomial name
- Rossella antarctica Carter, 1872

Synonyms
- Acanthascus grossularia Schulze, 1886; Rossella antarctica antarctica Carter, 1872; Rossella antarctica gaussi Schulze & Kirkpatrick, 1910; Rossella antarctica solida Kirkpatrick, *1907; Rossella antarctica var. intermedia Burton, 1932

Species of glass sponge

Rossella antarctica is a relatively small species of glass sponge. It is widely distributed in the southern hemisphere, particularly in the Antarctic and sub-Antarctic regions.

== Description ==
This off-white to grey sponge may grow up to 300 mm (12 in) long. It has a semispherical to ovoid form with a large, deep oscule on the upper surface. The upper part also has the largest diameter of the organism. The body is dense and contains relatively few canals. The whole surface is covered with long, hair like spicules that may protrude up to 30 mm (1.2 in) from the surface. These spicules are most dense at the base, where they entangle to form a stalk that attaches the sponge to the substrate.

=== Spicules ===
The following spicules make up the skeleton of this species:

- Robust diacts (spicules with two rays radiating in different directions from a single origin point) that may be up to 120 mm (4.7 in) long. They are longer in the lower third of the sponge. Clusters of four to seven spicules protrude from the surface, pointing upwards in the upper portions and downwards in the lower portions.
- Rough pentacts (five rayed spicules with perpendicular rays) covered in spines. They are hooked towards the end. They are situated just below the surface, forming the velum that is typical of this genus.
- Long and slender internal diacts. The ends are alightly rough and rounded and swollen.
- Robust spindle-like internal diacts with rough ends.
- Spined diacts with bunt or swollen ends. There may or may not be a central bulge.
- Oxyhexasters (spicules with six branching rays that end in sharp points) with short, spined rays.
- Slightly rough discohexasters (spicules with six branching rays that end in rounded discs).

== Distribution and habitat ==
While this species is mostly known from the Antarctic, it has also been found off the coasts of South Africa, Namibia, South America, and New Zealand. It has been found at depths of 8–2,000 m (26–6,562 ft).

== Ecology ==
Along with Anoxycalyx joubini and Rossella nuda and Rossella racovitzae, Rossella antarctica is one of the main hexactinellid sponges that comprise the bulk of Antarctic benthic biomass. Consequently, they form an important part of these communities. Individuals house a variety of invertebrate infauna, with an average of nearly 800 individuals per 100 ml. These include species belonging to a variety of taxa, including foraminiferans, polychaetes, arthropods, amphipods, copepods, nematodes, and molluscs. At least 68 species have been found - more than in any of the other mentioned species. This includes Halacarellus obsoletus, a mite that is believed to be an obligate associate of glass sponges. While the chemical defenses against predation in glass sponges are poorly known, Rossella antarctica has been observed to contain a chemical compound that has been shown to act as a deterrent against Odontaster validus at the very least.

This species has been observed to reproduce by budding.
