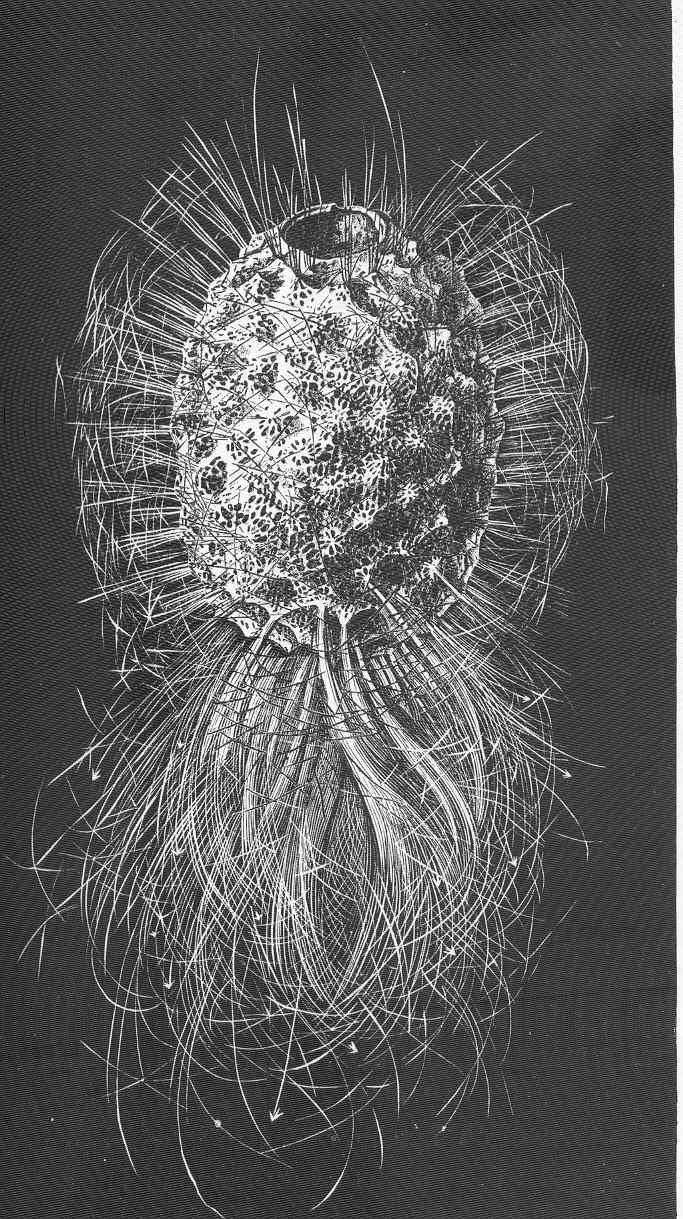
- Rossella veluta

Scientific classification
- Kingdom: Animalia
- Phylum: Porifera
- Class: Hexactinellida
- Order: Lyssacinosida
- Family: Rossellidae
- Subfamily: Rossellinae
- Genus: Rossella; Carter, 1872

Type species
- Rossella antarctica Carter, 1872

Species
- See text.

Synonyms
- Anaulosoma Kirkpatrick, 1907; Aulorossella Kirkpatrick, 1907; Gymnorossella Topsent, 1916

= Rossella (sponge) =

Genus of glass sponges

Rosella is a genus of glass sponges in the family Rossellidae. It is found in the Antarctic and sub-Antarctic regions.

== Description ==
Species are thick-walled saccular sponges. Calycocomes (six rayed spicules with secondary rays emanating from a solid calyx) are always present. They are often accompanied by spherical discohexactines (six rayed spicules with secondary rays ending as small discs), mesodiscohexasters (microscleres with primary rays that are rearranged by fusion to form eight compound primary rays situated at the corners of a cube. Secondary rays end as small discs) and microdiscohexasters (smaller forms of mesodiscohexasters).

Dermalia (outer spicules of any size class) are usually pentactines, sometimes with stauractines (cross-like spicules with four perpendicular rays) and hexactines. Prostalia lateralia (large protruding spicules), when present, are monaxons (spicules with a single axis) and sometimes pentactines. The hypodermal pentactine spicules (spicules with five rays) may be differentiated into spicules with claw-like ends, serving as a means of attachment to the substrate the sponge is growing on. They commonly have paratropal and orthotropal tangential rays.

The choanosomal skeleton is made of diactines (two rayed spicule with rays aligned on the same axis), and rarely hexactines (spicule with six perpendicular rays). Atralia (spicules associated with the atrial cavity) are mainly hexactines, rarely with pentactines or diactines.

== Ecology ==
Rossella species are abundant on the Antarctic shelf, where they may cover as much as half of the sea floor. They therefore play an important role in forming the benthic communities of this region. They form biogenic structures, increasing the structural complexity of the sea floor of this region. This more heterogeneous space can be utilised by other species.

A wide variety of invertebrate species also live within the sponge structure, including foraminiferans, polychaetes, amphipods, isopods, tanaids, copepods, ostracods, acari, pycnogonids, gastropods, bivalves, and nematodes. A sponge may host thousands of specimens and tens of species per 100 ml.

== Species ==
The relationships between the species in this genus are not particularly well understood. The species composition has changed dramatically over the years, depending on which criteria are used. The external forms of this genus are highly variable, even within a single species. There is strong genetic evidence for a species flock in this genus, that is an accumulation of a large number of closely related species confined to a small area. These typically represent a rapid evolution of a dominant (and endemic) group in a region, resulting in many similar species. The current evidence suggests that this genus contains two clades corresponding to the well-defined species R. antarctica, and the diverse assemblage of species that has been termed the R. racovitzae flock. More research is needed to understand how many species fall in this genus and how they are related.

The following species are, however, currently (October 2021) recognised:

- Rossella antarctica Carter, 1872
- Rossella aperta (Topsent, 1916)
- Rossella dubia (Schulze, 1886)
- Rossella fibulata Schulze & Kirkpatrick, 1910
- Rossella gaini (Topsent, 1916)
- Rossella gaussi Schulze & Kirkpatrick, 1910
- Rossella ijimai Dendy, 1924
- Rossella inermis (Topsent, 1916)
- Rossella levis (Kirkpatrick, 1907)
- Rossella longstaffi (Kirkpatrick, 1907)
- Rossella lychnophora Schulze & Kirkpatrick, 1910
- Rossella mixta Schulze & Kirkpatrick, 1910
- Rossella nuda Topsent, 1901
- Rossella pilosa (Kirkpatrick, 1907)
- Rossella podagrosa Kirkpatrick, 1907
- Rossella racovitzae Topsent, 1901
- Rossella schulzei (Kirkpatrick, 1907)
- Rossella vanhoeffeni (Schulze & Kirkpatrick, 1910)
- Rossella villosa Burton, 1929
