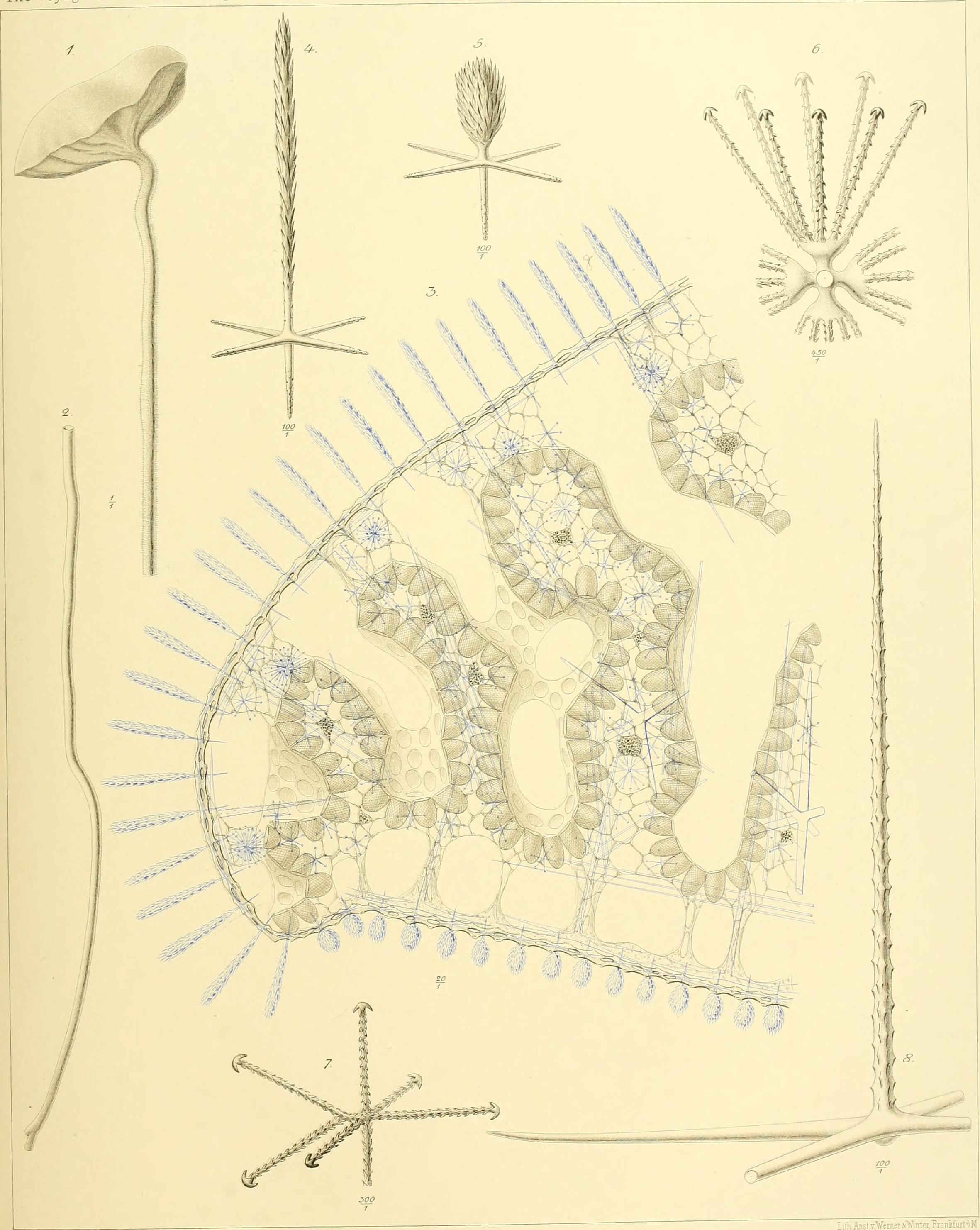
- Caulophacus elegans, illustration in: Report on the scientific results of the voyage of H.M.S. Challenger during the years 1873-76 - under the command of Captain George S. Nares, R.N., F.R.S. and Captain Frank Turle Thomson, R.N. (1887).

Scientific classification
- Domain: Eukaryota
- Kingdom: Animalia
- Phylum: Porifera
- Class: Hexactinellida
- Order: Lyssacinosida
- Family: Rossellidae
- Subfamily: Lanuginellinae
- Genus: Caulophacus; Schulze, 1886

Type species
- Caulophacus latus Schulze, 1886

Subgenera
- Caulophacus (Caulodiscus); Caulophacus (Caulophacella); Caulophacus (Caulophacus); Caulophacus (Oxydiscus)

= Caulophacus =

Genus of sponges

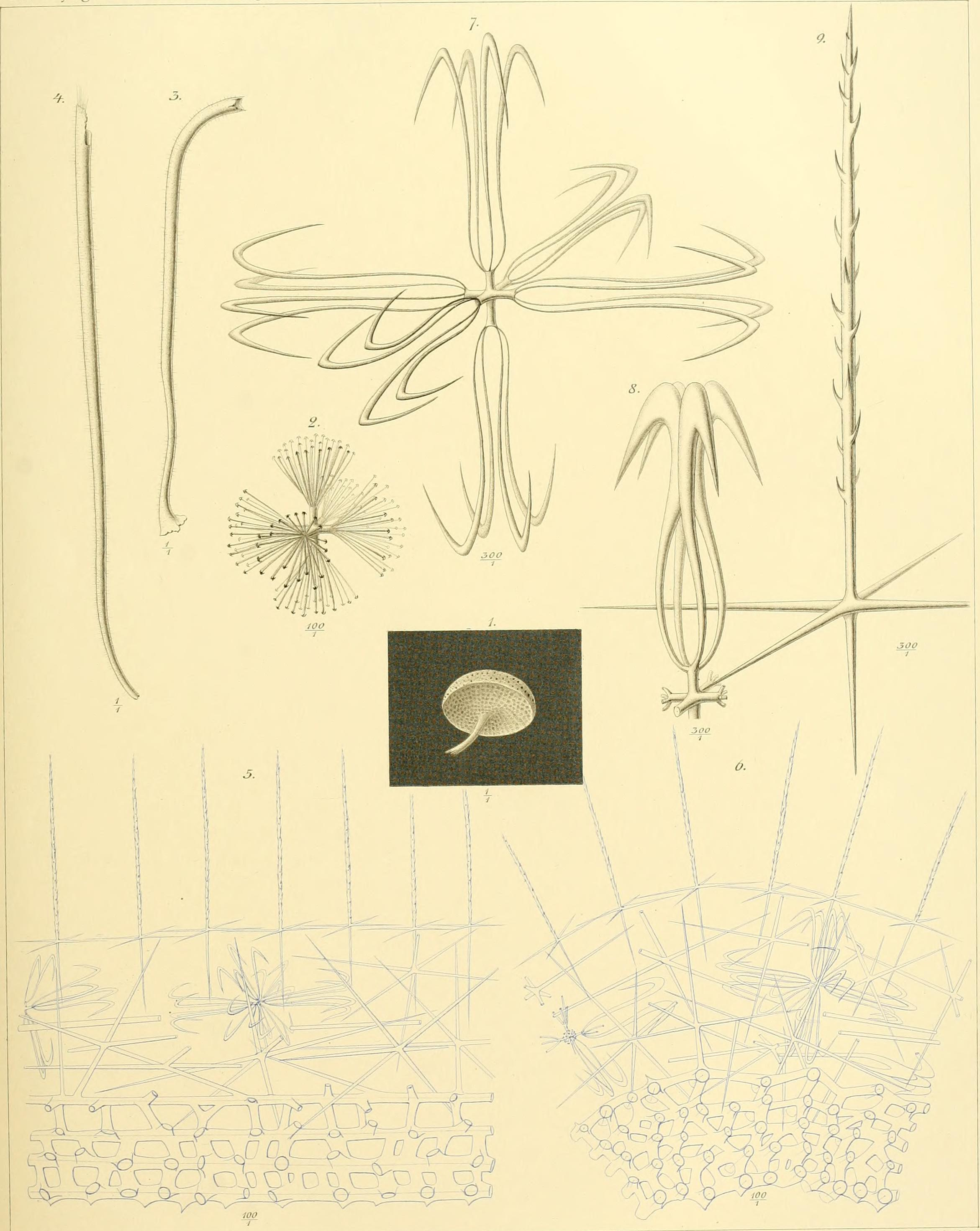
Caulophacus elegans, illustration in: Report on the scientific results of the voyage of H.M.S. Challenger during the years 1873-76 - under the command of Captain George S. Nares, R.N., F.R.S. and Captain Frank Turle Thomson, R.N. (1887).

Caulophacus is a genus of glass sponges belonging to the subfamily Lanuginellinae.

== Species ==
Subgenus Caulophacus (Caulodiscus) Ijima, 1927

- Caulophacus brandti Janussen, Tabachnick & Tendal, 2004
- Caulophacus iocasicus Gong & Li, 2023
- Caulophacus leonieae Buskowiak & Janussen, 2021
- Caulophacus lotifolium Ijima, 1903
- Caulophacus onychohexactinus Tabachnick & Levi, 2004
- Caulophacus polyspicula Tabachnick, 1990
- Caulophacus valdiviae Schulze, 1904

Subgenus Caulophacus (Caulophacella) Lendenfeld, 1915

- Caulophacus tenuis Lendenfeld, 1915

Subgenus Caulophacus (Caulophacus) Schulze, 1886

- Caulophacus abyssalis Tabachnick, 1990
- Caulophacus adakensis Reiswig & Stone, 2013
- Caulophacus agassizi Schulze, 1899
- Caulophacus antarcticus Schulze & Kirkpatrick, 1910
- Caulophacus arcticus (Hansen, 1885)
- Caulophacus basispinosus Levi, 1964
- Caulophacus chilensis Reiswig & Araya, 2014
- Caulophacus cyanae Boury-Esnault & De Vos, 1988
- Caulophacus discohexactinus Janussen, Tabachnick & Tendal, 2004
- Caulophacus discohexaster Tabachnick & Levi, 2004
- Caulophacus elegans Schulze, 1886
- Caulophacus galatheae Levi, 1964
- Caulophacus hadalis Levi, 1964
- Caulophacus hyperboreus Koltun, 1967
- Caulophacus instabilis Topsent, 1910
- Caulophacus latus Schulze, 1886
- Caulophacus miri Tabachnick, Menshenina & Ehrlich, 2023
- Caulophacus oviformis (Schulze, 1886)
- Caulophacus palmeri Goodwin, Berman, Janussen, Göcke & Hendry, 2016
- Caulophacus pipetta (Schulze, 1886)
- Caulophacus ramosus Reiswig, Dohrmann & Kelly, 2021
- Caulophacus schulzei Wilson, 1904
- Caulophacus scotiae Topsent, 1910
- Caulophacus serpens Reiswig, Dohrmann & Kelly, 2021
- Caulophacus subarcticus Tabachnick, Menshenina & Ehrlich, 2023
- Caulophacus variens Tabachnick, 1988
- Caulophacus wilsoni Kersken, Janussen & Martínez Arbizu, 2018 (interim unpublished)

Subgenus Caulophacus (Oxydiscus) Janussen, Tabachnick & Tendal, 2004

- Caulophacus weddelli Janussen, Tabachnick & Tendal, 2004

== See also ==
- List of prehistoric sponge genera
