= Oopsacas minuta =

Conservation status
- Least Concern (IUCN 3.1)

Scientific classification
- Kingdom: Animalia
- Phylum: Porifera
- Class: Hexactinellida
- Order: Lyssacinosida
- Family: Leucopsacidae
- Genus: Oopsacas
- Species: O. minuta

Binomial name
- Oopsacas minuta Topsent, 1927

Glass sponge

Oopsacas minuta is a species of glass sponge found in cold submarine caves in the Mediterranean. Unlike most glass sponges, O. minuta lives in shallow waters above 200 meters in depth. At this depth the temperature is low and constant, so silica metabolism is optimized.

== Description ==
O. minuta has an elongated, cylindrical and a slightly flared shape. It can be between a few millimeters and 3.5 centimeters in size, and is supported by a siliceous skeleton like other glass sponges. These spindles partially block the top of the sponge. There are no obvious oscules. The sponge is anchored or suspended from the cave by silica fibers. O. minuta belongs to the order Lyssacinosida. Lyssacinosida are characterized by the parenchymal spicules mostly being unconnected; this is unlike other sponges in the subclass where the spicules form a connected skeleton. O. minuta has the smallest sponge genome, and among the smallest animal genomes, so far sequenced, comprising 16,413 protein-encoding genes. Its mitochondial genome contains 24 noncoding genes and 14 protein-encoding genes. The spindles of O. minuta have three axes and six points. This species does not have pinacocytes, which are the cells that form the outer layer in other sponges. Instead of true choanocytes it has frill structures that bud from the syncytium.

== Feeding ==
The Oopsacas minuta is a filter feeder. It sucks in water and eats microphage. The internal flagellum beat and create a stream of water filled with bacteria and food particles; it is retained in frills that come from a syncytium. This multinucleated syncytium is the major tissue component of Hexactinellid sponges. Glass sponge reefs are known for having the highest grazing rate of any benthic suspension feeding community.

== Reproduction ==
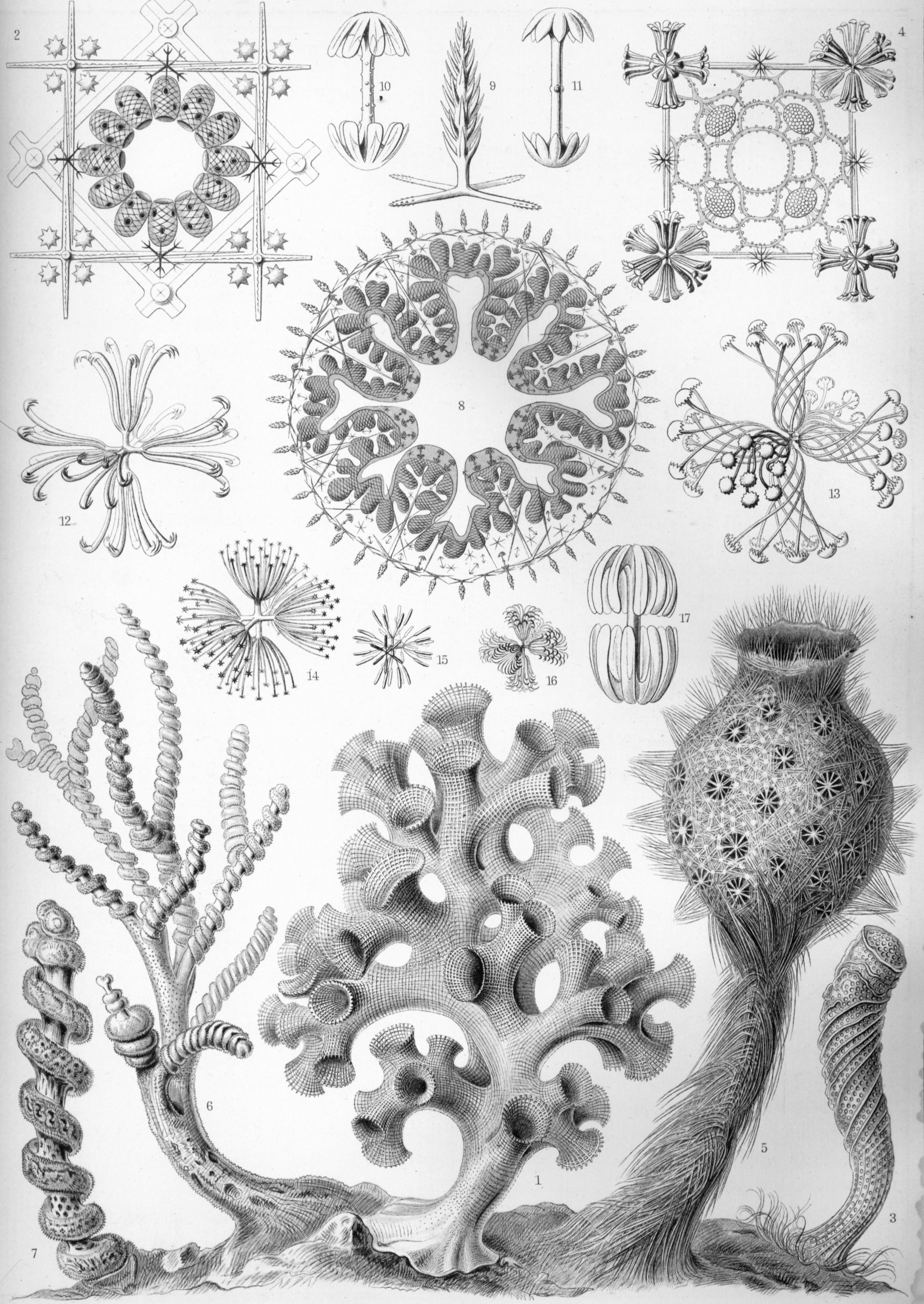
Various forms of Glass sponges

Oopsacas minuta is a viviparous species, meaning they produce living young instead of eggs. The mother sponge will release a small ciliated larva. This larva leads a short pelagic life in the open water inside the cave. It then settles on the bedrock of the cave. Embryonic development of the O. minuta goes through the classic cell divisions, some of the cells fuse and the syncytium is formed secondary. Something that is unique in the Porifera phylum is that the first stages of cleavage are spiral, and gastrulation happens by primary delamination. O. minuta reproduce year-round and produces the only known live larvae. Asexual reproduction has not been observed from this species.

== Embryogenesis ==
Glass sponges (Hexactinellids) have different body plans than other members of the Metazoan because the adult tissue is made up of a single giant multinucleated syncytium. This multinucleated syncytium creates the inner and outer layers of the sponge and is connected to uninucleate cellular regions by cytoplasmic bridges. In O. minuta differentiation of the tissues happens early in embryogenesis. All cells and syncytia are linked together by cytoplasmic bridges.

== Metamorphosis ==
A study done using three-dimensional models showed the larval tissue reorganization at metamorphosis of the larva. The larvae land on their anterior swimming pole or on one side. During the first stage of metamorphosis the multiciliate cells form a belt around the larva and then are discarded. Throughout metamorphosis the larval flagellated chambers are maintained. These larval flagellated chambers become the kernels of the first pumping chambers of the juvenile sponge. Once the larvae of the O. minuta settle syncytial tissues containing yolk inclusions enlarge the larval chambers. Lipid inclusions that are located at the basal attachment site, become smaller. The post-metamorphic flagellated chambers are formed from flagellated chambers.
