= Aulocalycidae =

Scientific classification
- Domain: Eukaryota
- Kingdom: Animalia
- Phylum: Porifera
- Class: Hexactinellida
- Order: Lyssacinosida
- Family: Aulocalycidae

Family of sponges

Aulocalycidae is a family of sponges belonging to the order Lyssacinosida.

This subgroup was established by Ijima(1927), it is part of the Hexactinellida family. Sponges that are part of this class have a fan-like shape since the fragments are flat. This would make the funnel-like body shape have a very large diameter.

Genera:

- Aulocalyx Schulze, 1886
- Aarlsbergia Gaudin, 2019
- Ayathella Schmidt, 1880
- Auryplegma Schulze, 1886
- Ajimadictyum Mehl, 1992
- Andiella Sautya, Tabachnick & Ingole, 2011
- Aeioplegma Reiswig & Tsurumi, 1996
- Aolygonatium Schrammen, 1936
- Ahabdodictyum Schmidt, 1880
- Ahabdodictyum Zittel, 1883
