= Sponge reef =

Reefs produced by sea sponges

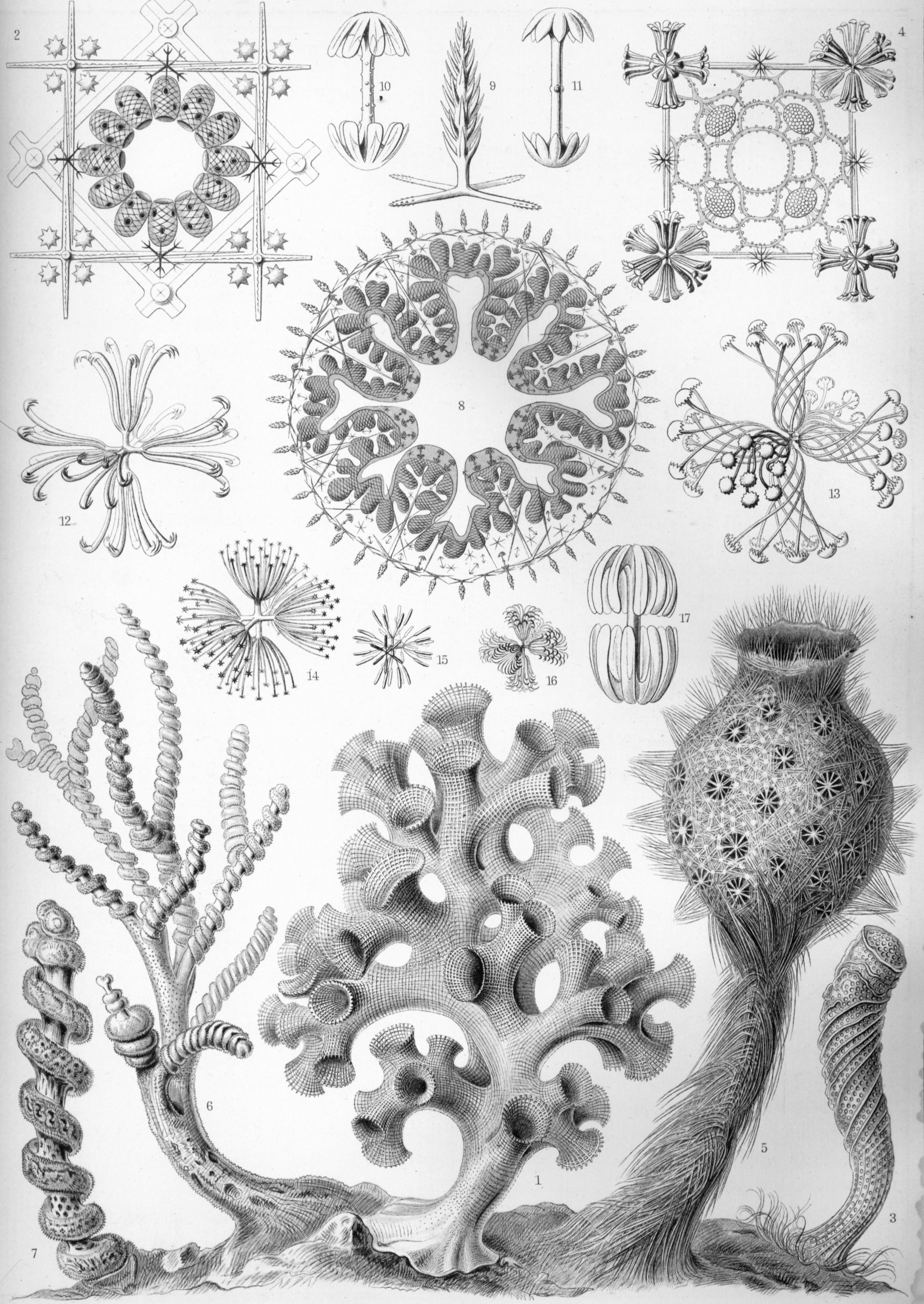
"Hexactinellae" from Ernst Haeckel's Kunstformen der Natur, 1904

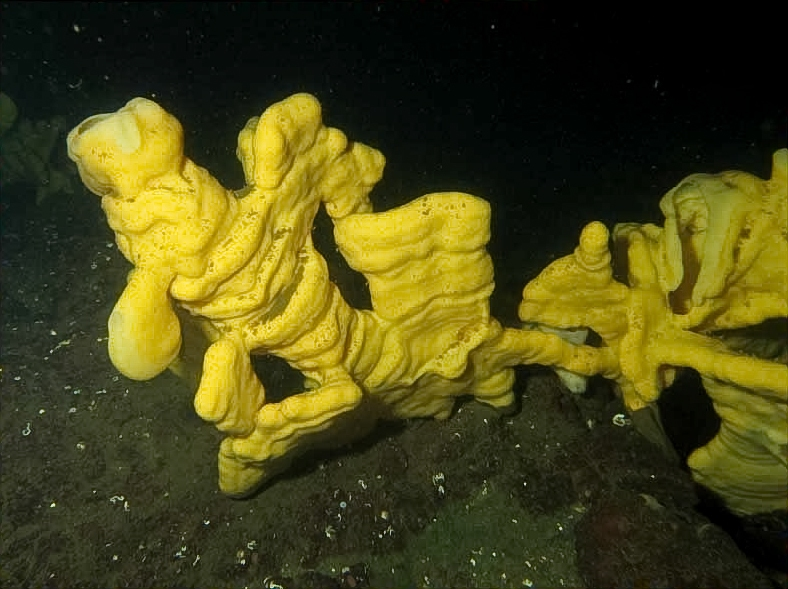
Cloud sponge (Aphrocallistes vastus) is a major reef-building species

Sponge reefs are reefs produced by sea sponges. All modern sponge reefs are formed by hexactinellid sponges, which have an endoskeleton made of silica spicules and are often referred to as "glass sponges", while historically the non-spiculed, calcite-skeletoned archaeocyathid and stromatoporoid sponges were the primary reef-builders.

Sponge reefs were once a dominant landscape in the Paleozoic and Mesozoic sea, but are now very rare, and found only in waters off the coast of North America's Pacific Northwest region, more specifically southern Alaska, British Columbia and Washington. Sponge reefs were reported in 2018 within the strait of Georgia and Howe sound close to Vancouver. Although still common in the late Jurassic period, reef-building sponges were believed to have gone extinct during or shortly after the Cretaceous period, until the existing reefs were discovered in Queen Charlotte sound in 1987–1988 – hence these sometimes being dubbed living fossils.

Like coral reefs, sponge reefs serve an important ecological function as feeding, breeding and nursery habitats for demersal fish and invertebrates but are currently threatened by the commercial fishery, offshore oil and gas industries. Attempts are being made to protect these unique ecosystems through fishery closures and potentially the establishment of Marine Protected Areas (MPAs) around the sponge reefs.

== Characteristics of hexactinellid sponges ==
Hexactinellids, or "glassy" sponges are characterized by a rigid framework of spicules made of silica. Unlike other poriferans, hexactinellids do not possess the ability to contract. Another unique feature of glassy sponges is that their tissues are made up almost entirely of syncytia. In a syncytium there are many nuclei in a continuous cytoplasm; nuclei are not packaged in discrete cells.

As a result, the sponge has a distinctive electrical conduction system across its body. This allows the sponge to rapidly respond to disturbances such as a physical impact or excessive sediment in the water. The sponge's response is to stop feeding. It will try to resume feeding after 20–30 minutes, but will stop again if the irritation is still present.

Hexactinellids are exclusively marine and are found throughout the world in deep (>1000 m) oceans. Individual sponges grow at a rate of 0–7 cm/year, and can live to be at least 220 years old. Little is known about hexactinellid sponge reproduction. Like all poriferans, the hexactinellids are filter feeders. They obtain nutrition from direct absorption of dissolved substances, and to a lesser extent from particulate materials.

There are no known predators of healthy reef sponges. This is likely because the sponges possess very little organic tissue; the siliceous skeleton accounts for 90% of the sponge body weight.

Hexasterophoran sponges have spicules called hexactines that have six rays set at right angles. Orders within hexasterophora are classified by how tightly the spicules interlock with Lyssanctinosan spicules less tightly interlocked than those of Hexactinosan sponges.

The primary frame-building sponges are all members of the order Hexactinosa, and include the species Chonelasma/Heterochone calyx (chalice sponge), Aphrocallistes vastus (cloud sponge), and Farrea occa. Hexactinosan sponges have a rigid scaffolding of "fused" spicules that persists after the death of the sponge.

Other sponge species abundant on sponge reefs are members of the order Lyssactinosa (Rosselid sponges) and include Rhabdocalyptus dawsoni (boot sponge), Acanthascus platei, Acanthascus cactus and Staurocalyptus dowlingi. Rosselid sponges have a "woven" or "loose" siliceous skeleton that does not persist after the death of the sponge, and are capable of forming mats, but not reefs.

== Location of sponge reefs ==
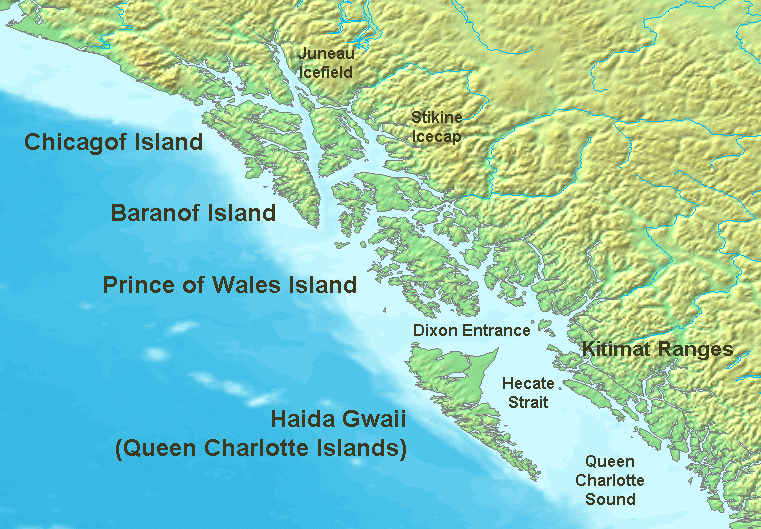
Sponge reefs can only be found off a small part of the northwest coast of North America

Although hexactinellid sponges are found worldwide in deep seawater, the only place that they are known to form reefs is between south east Alaska and off Grays harbor. Communities of Rosselid sponges called "sponge mats" are widely distributed; they are found in canyons in the North Atlantic, in the Canadian Arctic and on Antarctic continental shelves. There is also a reef formed of siliceous Demospongiae species off of Axel Heiberg Island in the Arctic Ocean.

Four hexactinellid reefs were discovered in the Queen Charlotte Basin (QCB) in 1987–1988. Three more reefs were reported in the Georgia Basin (GB) in 2005. The QCB reefs are found 70–80 km from the coastline in water 165–240 m deep. These reefs cover over 700 km² of the ocean floor.

Sponge reefs require unique conditions, which may explain their global rarity. They are found only in glacier-scoured troughs of low-angle continental shelf. The seafloor is stable and consists of rock, coarse gravel, and large boulders. Hexactinellid sponges require a hard substrate, and do not anchor to muddy or sandy sea floors.

They are found only where sedimentation rates are low, dissolved silica is high (43–75 μM), and bottom currents are between 0.15 and 0.30 m/s. Dissolved oxygen is low (64–152 μM), and temperatures are a cool 5.5-7.3 °C at the reefs. Surface temperatures range between 6 °C in April and 14 °C in August.

Downwellings are common in Hecate Strait and Queen Charlotte Sound, especially in winter, but there is an occasional summer upwelling. These upwellings bring nutrient-rich waters to the sponge reefs.

== Structure of sponge reefs ==
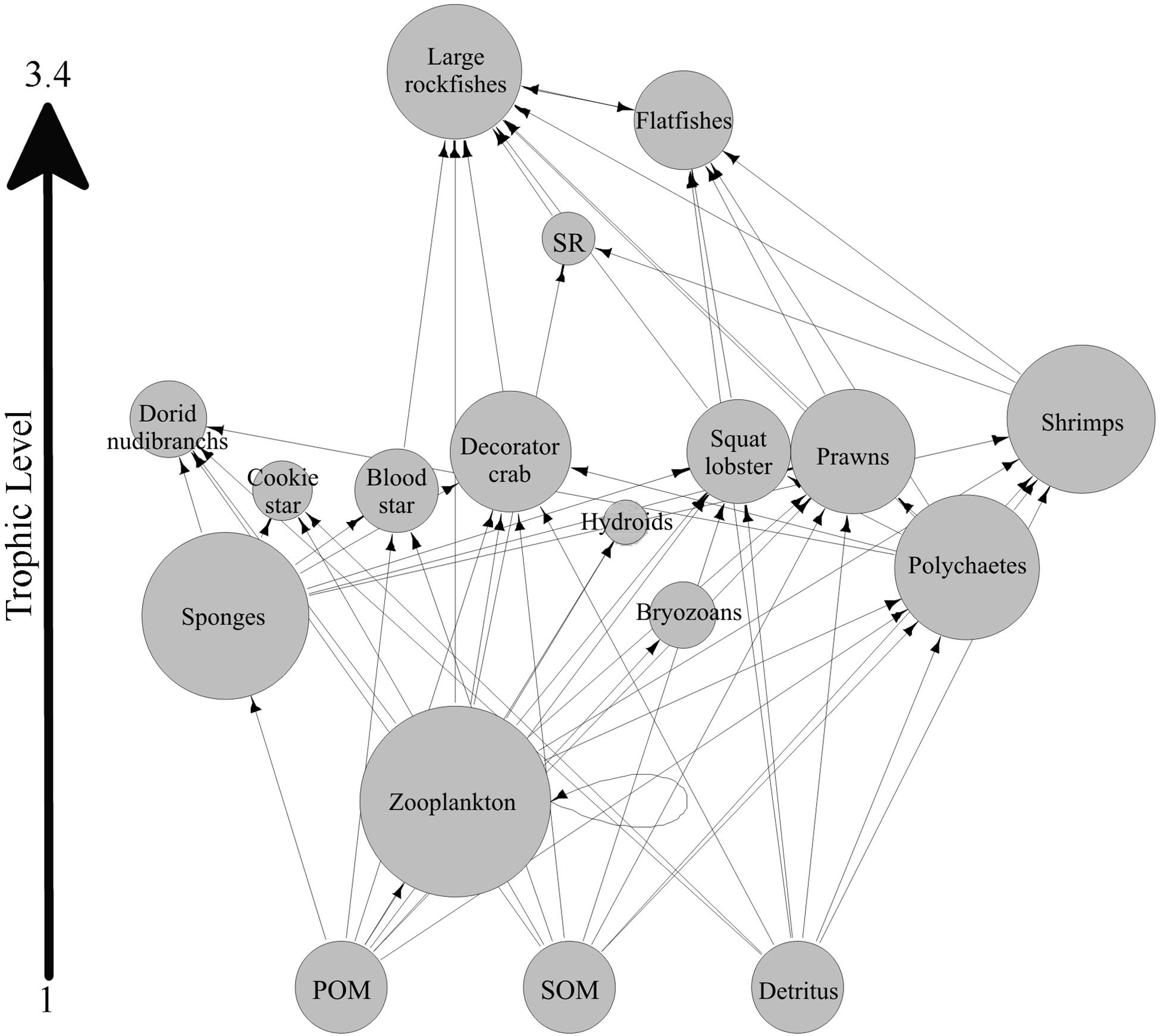
Generalised food web for sponge reefs

Each living sponge on the surface of the reef can be over 1.5 m tall. The reefs are composed of mounds called "bioherms" that are up to 21 m high, and sheets called "biostromes" that are 2–10 m thick and may be many kilometers wide.

Each sponge in the order Hexactinosa has a rigid skeleton that persists after the death of the animal. This provides an excellent substrate for sponge larvae to settle upon, and new sponges grow on the framework of past generations. The growth of sponge reefs is thus analogous to that of coral reefs. The tendrils of new sponges wrap around spicules of older, deceased sponges. The tendrils will later form the basal plate of the adult sponge that firmly anchors the animal to the reef.

Deep ocean currents carry fine sediments that are captured by the scaffolding of sponge reefs. A sediment matrix of silt, clay, and some sand forms around the base of the sponge bioherms. The sediment matrix is soft near the surface, and firm below one metre deep. Dead sponges become covered in sediment, but do not lose their supportive siliceous skeleton. The sponge sediments have high levels of silica and organic carbon. The reefs grow parallel to the glacial troughs, and the morphology of reefs is due to deep currents.

== In the fossil record ==
Hexactinellids first appeared in the fossil record during the Late Proterozoic, and the first hexactinosans were found in the Late Devonian. Hexactinellid sponge reefs were first identified in the Middle Triassic (245–208 million years ago). The sponges reached their full extent in the late Jurassic (201–145 million years ago) when a discontinuous reef system 7,000 km long stretched across the northern Tethys and North Atlantic basins. This chain of sponge reefs is the largest known biostructure to have ever existed on Earth.

The sponge reefs declined throughout the Cretaceous period as coral and rudist reefs were becoming prominent. It is theorized that the spread of diatoms may have been detrimental to the sponges, as diatoms compete with hexactinellid sponges for silica.

It is estimated through radiocarbon dating of reef cores that the reefs have been living on the continental shelf of Western Canada for 8,500–9,000 years.

== Ecological significance ==
Sponge reefs provide structure on the otherwise relatively featureless continental shelf. They provide habitat for fish and invertebrates, and may serve as an important nursery area for these animals. More research is required to determine the full ecological importance of these reefs.

Observations by crewed submersible indicate that the fauna of sponge reefs differs from surrounding areas. Organisms found in and around sponge reefs include annelid worms, bryozoans, spider crab, King crab, shrimp, prawns, and euphausids. Echinoderms, especially sea urchins and sea stars, were abundant in areas of the reef where the sponges were dying or deceased, and can be used as an indicator of sponge reef health. Rockfish, especially Sebastes species, live in openings and in between sponges. Gravid and juvenile rockfish were observed, suggesting that the reefs are being used as a nursery area. Foraminiferans are abundant around the reefs, and diatoms are scarce. The consortium of organisms living in and around sponge reefs has changed very little since the Jurassic.

== Destruction of sponge reefs ==
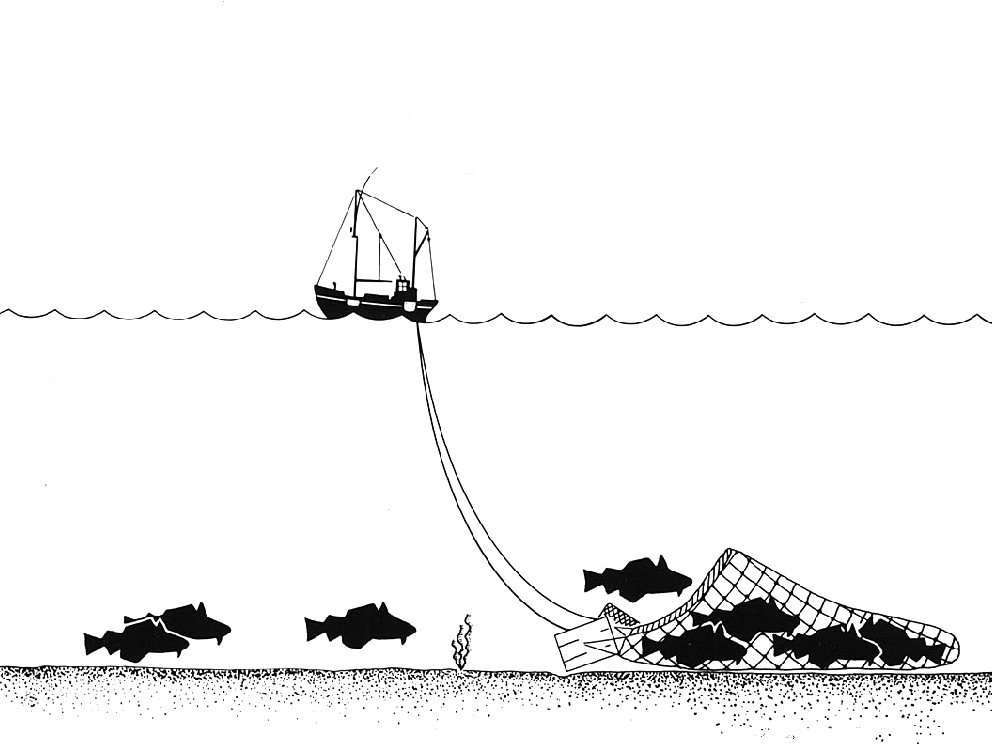
Bottom trawling, in which a net is dragged along the sea floor, is particularly damaging to sponge reefs

The reefs are susceptible to damage by fishing, especially bottom trawling and dredging. In typical groundfish trawling, a large net is dragged across the ocean floor, its mouth held open by two 2 tonne doors called otterboards. The siliceous skeleton of the sponges is fragile, and these organisms are easily broken by physical impact. The impacts of bottom trawling have been observed in three of the reefs in the QCB. Trawling damage appears as parallel tracks 70–100 m apart that may extend for several kilometers. Each trawl track is 10 cm deep, 20 cm wide, and occurs at depths of 210–220 m. Sponges in the vicinity of trawl tracks are shattered or completely removed.

While less harmful, hook and line fishing as well as crustacean trapping may also damage the reefs. When the fishing gear is hauled to the surface, the lines and traps drag along the ocean floor and have the potential to break corals and sponges. Broken sponge "stumps", as well as those with abraded sides, were found in regions where line and trap fishing took place.

Breakage of reef sponges may have dire consequences for the recruitment of new sponges, as sponge larvae require the siliceous skeletons of past generations as a substrate. Without a hard substrate, new sponges cannot settle and regrow broken parts of the reef. It has been estimated that broken sponge reefs may take up to 200 years to recover.

In addition, offshore oil and gas exploration threatens the reefs. The government of British Columbia has lifted a moratorium preventing exploratory drilling and tanker traffic in Hecate Strait and Queen Charlotte Sound, and the area has been leased by the oil and gas industry. Even if exploratory drilling is not done on or immediately adjacent to the reefs, it may still have a negative impact by increasing the amount of sediment in the seawater, or through hydrocarbon pollution.

== Protection ==
In 1999, Fisheries and Oceans Canada requested that groundfish trawlers voluntarily avoid the sponge reefs. In 2002, following reports of new reef damage sustained since 1999, the ministry initiated regulated closures of groundfish trawling and voluntary closures of shrimp trawl fishing in areas where sponge reefs were known to inhabit.

Protection of the four sponge reefs in Hecate Strait and Queen Charlotte Sound was included as a "management issue" in the 2005/06 groundfish trawling management plan. The management plan recommended that an additional 9 km (5.6 mi) buffer zone around the reefs be added to the existing groundfish trawl closures. The reefs were also being considered as locations for future Marine Protected Areas (MPAs). Although MPAs may be more effective than fishery closures for long-term protection of the reefs from bottom trawling, the oil and gas industry would still pose a threat.

In 2008, the issue of preserving sensitive underwater ecosystems along the North Coast of British Columbia were consolidated within the Pacific North Coast Integrated Management Area. The goal was to develop a plan to conserve this relatively undeveloped region, while fostering sustainable economies on the coast, which promised to make Canada a world leader in marine conservation. However, in 2011, the ministry withdrew support for the process in favour of greater consistency with ocean planning on the other coasts of Canada.

In February 2017, the sponge reefs of Hecate Sound and Queen Charlotte Sound were formally protected within the Hecate Strait and Queen Charlotte Sound Glass Sponge Reefs Marine Protected Area. The marine protected area covers an area of 2,410 km^{2} (930 sq mi) and prohibits any activity that could disturb or destroy the sponge reefs.

== See also ==
- Hexactinellid sponges (glass sponges)
- Cloud sponge
- Sponge Reef Project
