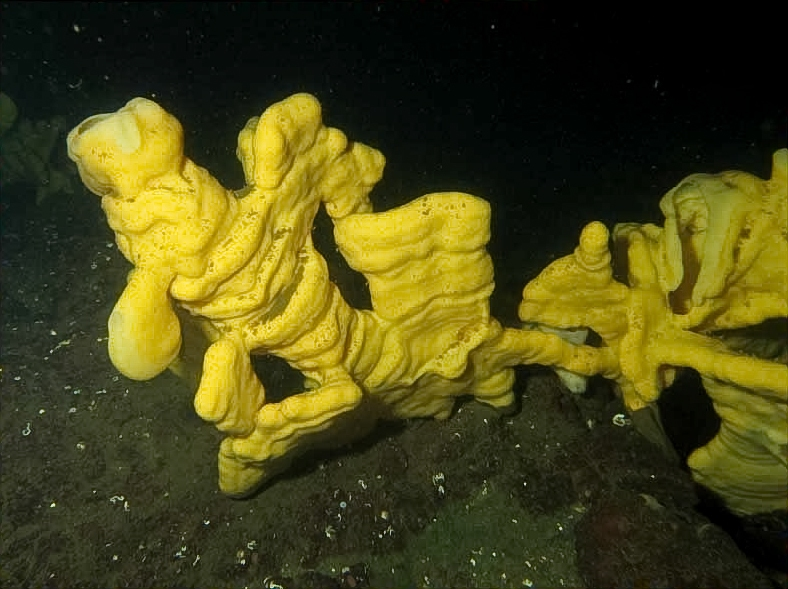

Scientific classification
- Kingdom: Animalia
- Phylum: Porifera
- Class: Hexactinellida
- Order: Sceptrulophora
- Family: Aphrocallistidae
- Genus: Aphrocallistes
- Species: A. vastus

Binomial name
- Aphrocallistes vastus Schulze, 1886

Synonyms
- List: Aphrocallistes intermedia Okada, 1932; Aphrocallistes whiteavesianus Lambe, 1892; Aphrocallistes yatsui Okada, 1932

= Cloud sponge =

Species of sponge

The cloud sponge (Aphrocallistes vastus), also known as the quesadilla sponge, is a species of sea sponge in the class Hexactinellida. It is a deep-water reef-forming animal. The species was first described by F.E. Schulze in 1886.

== Description ==
The cloud sponge takes the form of a large cup with an irregularly folded wall about 5 millimetres (0.20 in) thick. This is pierced by many pores about 1 millimetre (0.039 in) wide and covered by a thin dermal membrane. The skeletal elements form a lattice-like structure made up of fused spicules of silica. These mesh together and project into the adjoining canals. There is a fir-tree like concentration of spicules running through the body wall with the branches either having rounded or knobbly ends. The form of the sponge varies according to the location in which it is found. The quesadilla sponge's common name derives from a morphological variation first observed in the Olympic Coast National Marine Sanctuary. It often has a mitten-like structure or may be tall and cylindrical or bowl-like but in areas with strong currents can be dense and compact.

== Distribution ==
The cloud sponge is found in the northern Pacific Ocean. Its range includes Japan, Siberia, the Aleutian Islands and the west coast of North America from Alaska southwards to California and Mexico. It is a reef-building species found in deep waters on the western Canadian shelf growing on sediment-free rocks. It grows and is more easily studied in fiords off the coast of British Columbia at depths of only 25 metres (82 ft).

== Ecology ==
The cloud sponge is one of several species of glass sponge that form slow growing reefs in deep water. Their skeletons create habitat for diverse communities of invertebrates and fish. Its body is primarily made of biogenic silica (>90%) which is of no nutritional value yet dorid nudibranchs (Diaulula lentiginosa and Doris odhneri) have been shown to engorge themselves with cloud sponge.

The cloud sponge is fragile and has a texture rather like dry toast. Its growth rate is slow with juveniles growing into moderate sized individuals in ten or twenty years. It is easily damaged by seabed trawling and seems to be killed by severe trauma although small injuries can be repaired.

== See also ==
- Hexactinellid sponges (glass sponges)
- Sponge reef
- Sponge Reef Project
