= Acanthascus =

Scientific classification
- Kingdom: Animalia
- Phylum: Porifera
- Class: Hexactinellida
- Order: Lyssacinosida
- Family: Rossellidae
- Subfamily: Acanthascinae
- Genus: Acanthascus; Schulze, 1886

Genus of sponges

Acanthascus is a genus of sponges in the family Rossellidae. Species include:

- Acanthascus alani Ijima, 1898
- Acanthascus cactus Schulze, 1886
- Acanthascus koltuni Reiswig & Stone, 2013
- Acanthascus malacus Reiswig, 2014
- Acanthascus pachyderma Okada, 1932
- Acanthascus platei Schulze, 1886
- Acanthascus profundum (Koltun, 1967)
