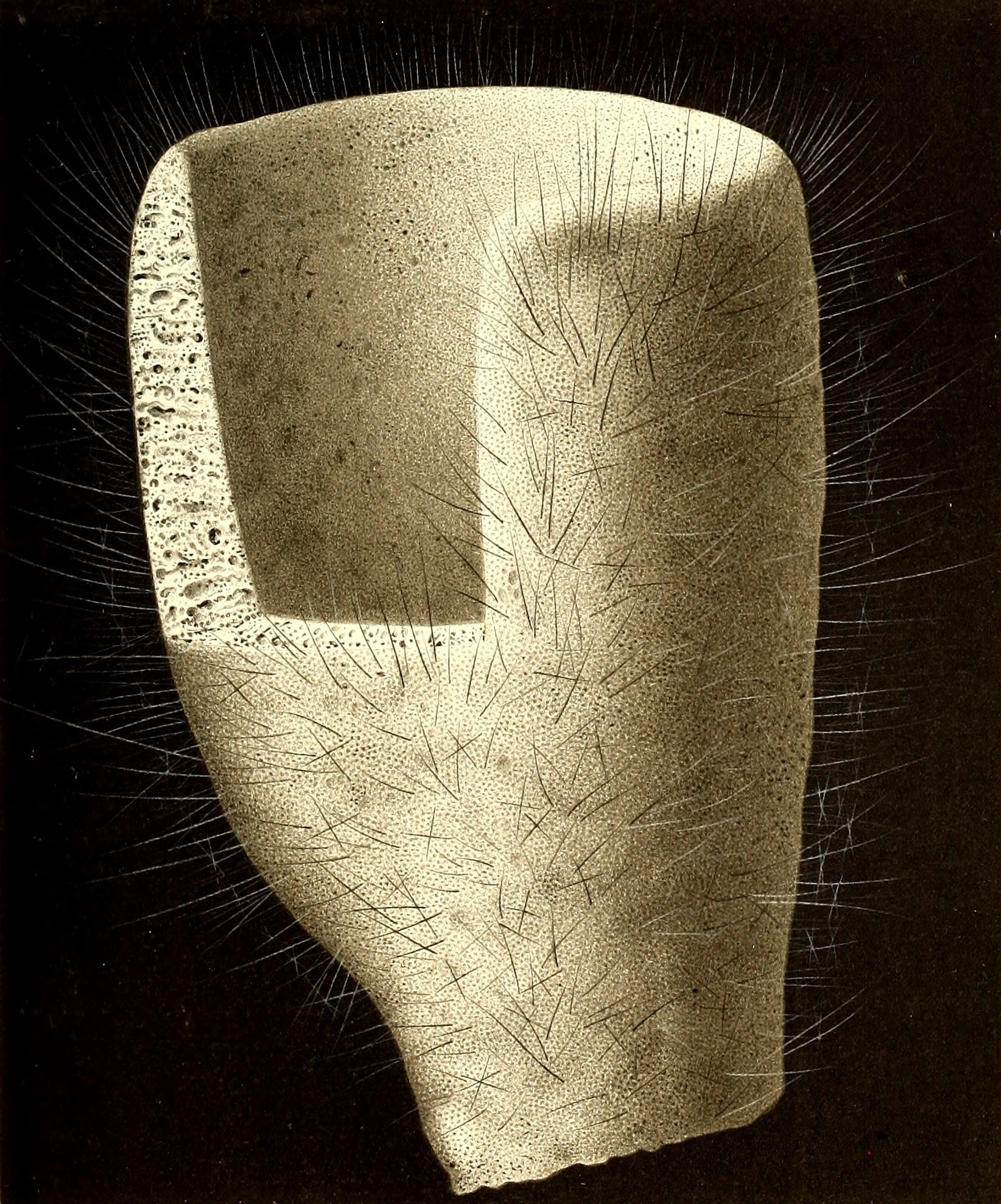
- S. dowlingi
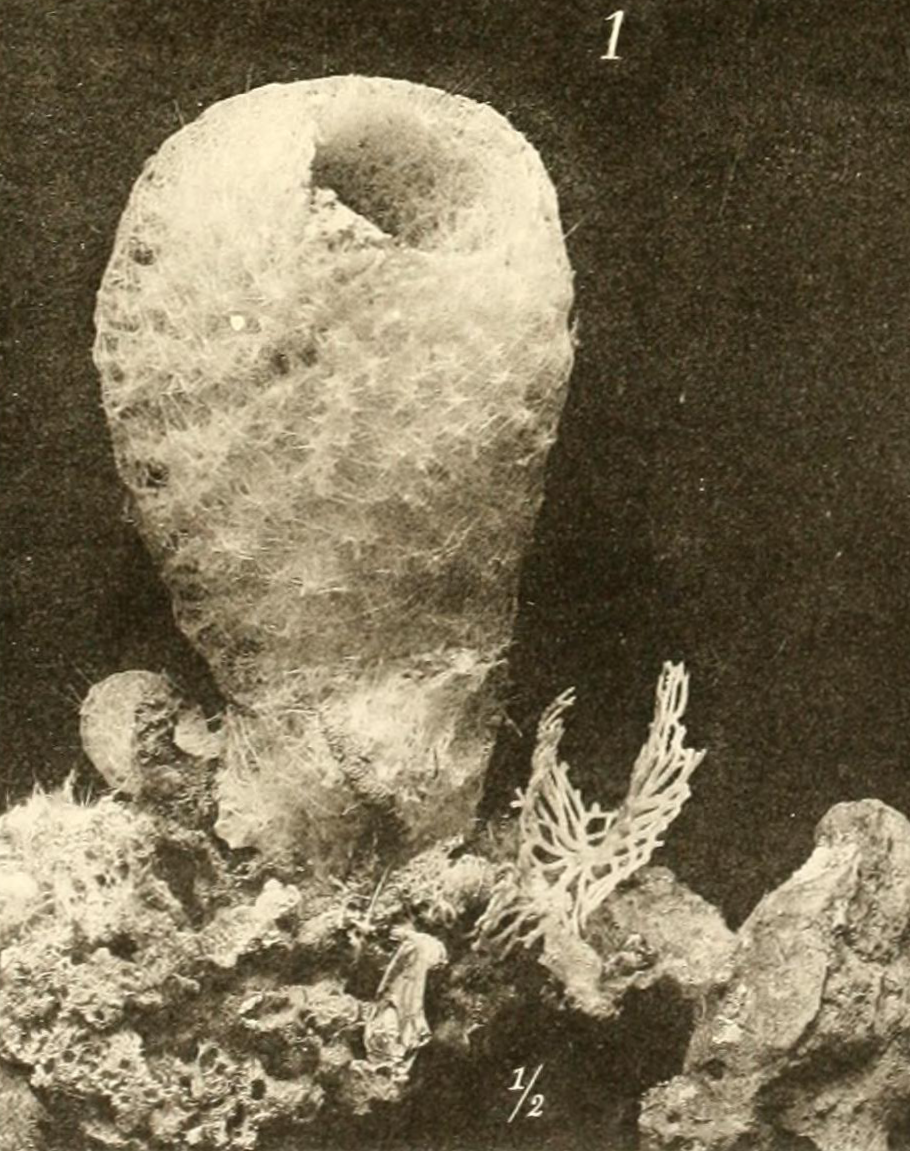
- S. glaber

Scientific classification
- Kingdom: Animalia
- Phylum: Porifera
- Class: Hexactinellida
- Order: Lyssacinosida
- Family: Rossellidae
- Subfamily: Acanthascinae
- Genus: Staurocalyptus; Ijima, 1897

Type species
- Rhabdocalyptus dowlingi Lambe, 1893

= Staurocalyptus =

Genus of sponges

Staurocalyptus is a genus of sponge. It was circumscribed in 1897 by Isao Ijima.

== Taxonomy ==
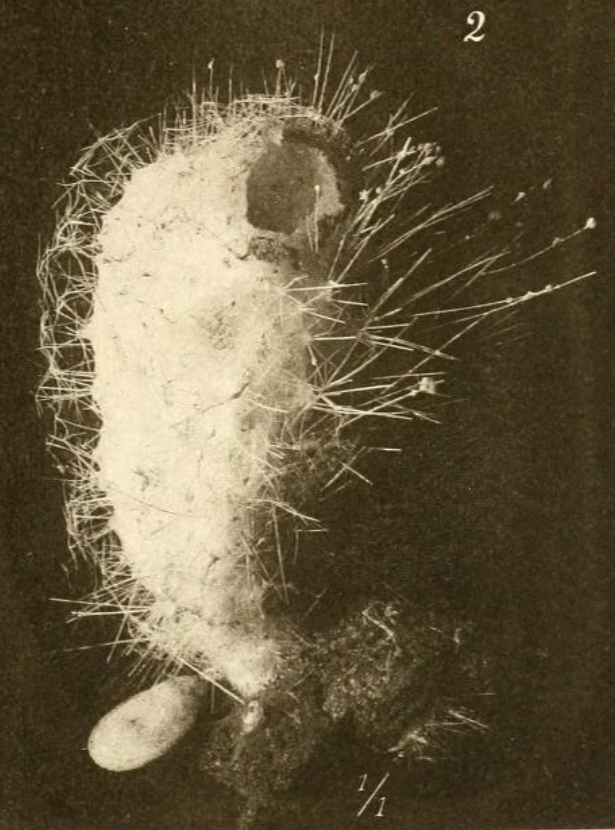
S. pleorhaphides

Ijima circumscribed Staurocalyptus as a genus in the family Rossellidae. His initial taxonomy included three newly described species and two transferred from Rhabdocalyptus. Ijimi did not designate a type species; in 1967 V. M. Koltun designated Rhabdocalyptus dowlingi Lambe, 1893 as the type species. A 2002 revision of Rossellidae by K. R. Tabachnick demoted Staurocalyptus to be a subgenus of Acanthascus and designated a new type species: Staurocalyptus glaber Ijima, 1897. However, as of 2017, WoRMS still classifies Staurocalyptus as a genus and follows Koltun's type species designation, not that of Tabachnick.

== Distribution ==
Its species are found in the Pacific Ocean, at a depth of 30–1,700 metres (98–5,577 ft).

== Species ==
As of 2017, WoRMS recognizes the following seventeen species:

- Staurocalyptus affinis Ijima, 1904
- Staurocalyptus celebesianus IIjima, 1927
- Staurocalyptus dowlingi (Lambe, 1893) Ijima, 1897
- Staurocalyptus entacanthus Ijima, 1904
- Staurocalyptus fasciculatus Schulze, 1899
- Staurocalyptus fuca Tabachnick, 1989
- Staurocalyptus glaber Ijima, 1897
- Staurocalyptus hamatus Lendenfeld, 1915
- Staurocalyptus heteractinus Ijima, 1897
- Staurocalyptus microchetus Ijima, 1898
- Staurocalyptus pleorhaphides Ijima, 1897
- Staurocalyptus psilosus Reiswig & Stone, 2013
- Staurocalyptus roeperi (Schulze, 1886) Ijima, 1897
- Staurocalyptus rugocruciatus Okada, 1932
- Staurocalyptus solidus Schulze, 1899
- Staurocalyptus tubulosus Ijima, 1904
- Staurocalyptus tylotus Reiswig & Stone, 2013
