= Hecate Strait and Queen Charlotte Sound Glass Sponge Reefs Marine Protected Area =

Protected marine area in British Columbia

Hecate Strait and Queen Charlotte Sound Glass Sponge Reefs
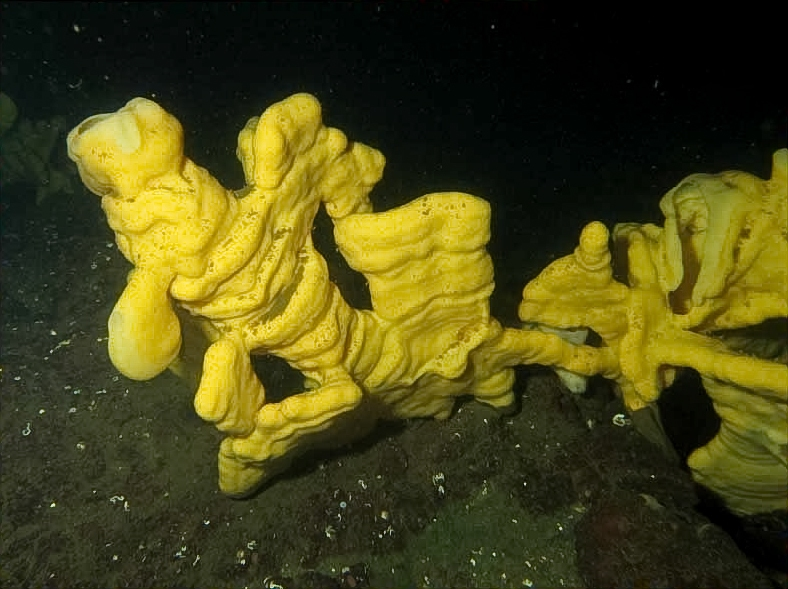
- Example of a cloud sponge in Saanich Inlet

- Location within British Columbia Location within Canada
- Location: Hecate Strait and Queen Charlotte Sound; British Columbia, Canada
- Coordinates: 52°10′N 129°35′W
- Area: 2,410 km^{2} (930 sq mi)
- Designation: Marine Protected Area
- Designated: February 2017
- Governing body: Fisheries and Oceans Canada

Hecate Strait and Queen Charlotte Sound Glass Sponge Reefs Marine Protected Area (HS/QCS MPA) is a 2,410-square-kilometre marine protected area located in Hecate Strait and Queen Charlotte Sound off the North Coast of British Columbia, Canada. The marine protected area was established in February 2017 with the goal of conserving the biological diversity, structural habitat, and ecosystem function of four glass sponge reefs. These reefs were the first discovered living specimens and are the largest glass sponge reefs in the world.

== History ==
Prior to their discovery in 1987, glass sponge reefs were believed to have been extinct worldwide since the end of the Jurassic period. The formation of glass sponge reefs requires a combination of unique geological conditions combined with the occurrence of the reef-forming species of Hexactinellid sponges.

It is estimated that the glass sponges are about 9,000 years old, with live glass sponge reefs being unique to the coastal waters of the Pacific.

In 2018, the marine protected area was added to UNESCO's tentative list of World Heritage Sites.

== See also ==
- Endeavour Hydrothermal Vents Marine Protected Area
- SGaan Kinghlas-Bowie Seamount Marine Protected Area
