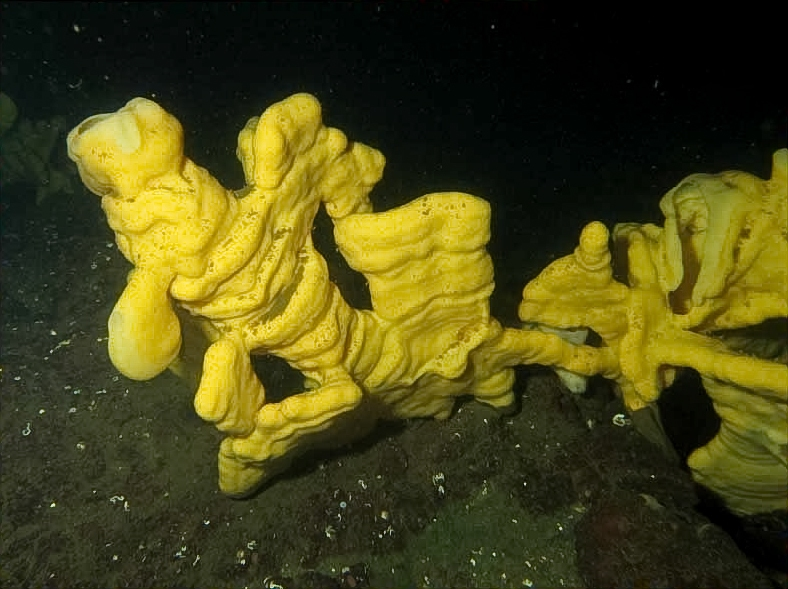
- Aphrocallistes vastus

Scientific classification
- Kingdom: Animalia
- Phylum: Porifera
- Class: Hexactinellida
- Order: Sceptrulophora
- Family: Aphrocallistidae
- Genus: Aphrocallistes; Gray, 1858

= Aphrocallistes =

Genus of sponges

Aphrocallistes is a genus of sponges belonging to the family Aphrocallistidae.

The species of this genus are found in Europe and North America.

Species:

- Aphrocallistes beatrix Gray, 1858
- Aphrocallistes bochotnicensis Hurcewicz, 1968
- Aphrocallistes cylindrodactylus Schrammen, 1912
- Aphrocallistes estevoui Termier & Termier, 1981
- Aphrocallistes kazimierzensis Hurcewicz, 1968
- Aphrocallistes lobatus Schrammen, 1912
- Aphrocallistes macroporus Lagneau-Herenger, 1962
- Aphrocallistes mammillaris Hurcewicz, 1968
- Aphrocallistes vastus Schulze, 1886
- Aphrocallistes verrucosus Lagneau-Herenger, 1962
- Aphrocallistes vistulae Hurcewicz, 1968
