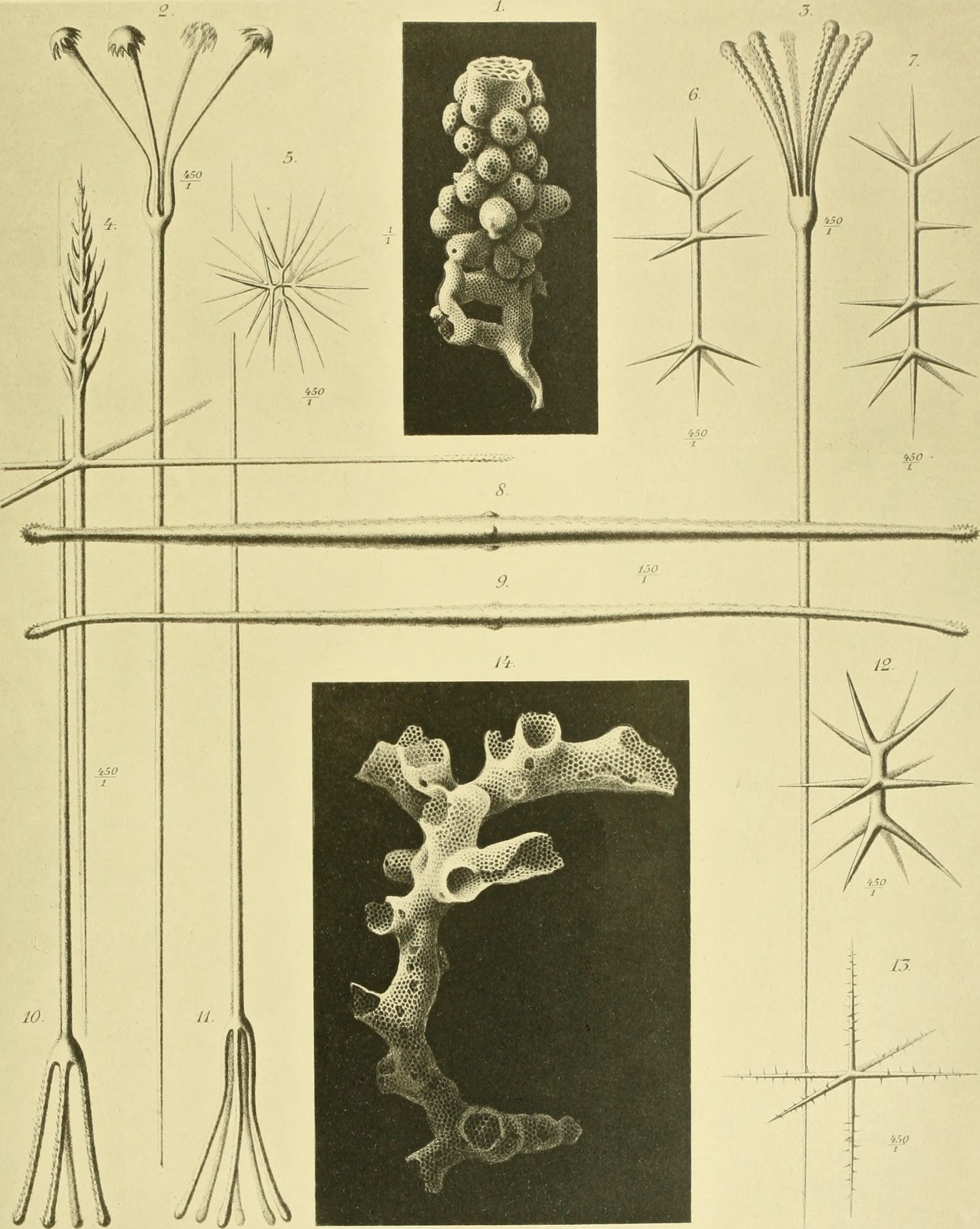
- Aphrocalistes beatrix, in the family Aphrocallistidae. Image from 'An account of the Indian triaxonia collected by the Royal Indian Marine Survey Ship Investigator (1902)'

Scientific classification
- Kingdom: Animalia
- Phylum: Porifera
- Class: Hexactinellida
- Order: Sceptrulophora
- Family: Aphrocallistidae; Gray, 1867

Genera
- Heterochone; Aphrocallistes

= Aphrocallistidae =

Family of hexactinellid sponges

Aphrocallistidae is a family of hexactinellid sponges in the order Sceptrulophora.

== Genera ==
There are two genera in Aphrocallistidae.

- Aphrocallistes Gray, 1858
- Heterochone Ijima, 1927
