= Hemidiscellidae =

Hemidiscellidae Temporal range: Gzhelian (latest Pennsylvanian) – Cretaceous

Scientific classification
- Domain: Eukaryota
- Kingdom: Animalia
- Phylum: Porifera
- Class: Hexactinellida
- Order: †Hemidiscosa; Schrammen, 1924
- Family: †Hemidiscellidae; Kling & Reif, 1969

Genera
- †Hemidiscella Reid, 1958; †Microhemidiscia Kling & Reif, 1969

Synonyms
- Microhemidisciidae Finks & Rigby, 2004

Extinct family of sponges

Hemidiscellidae is an extinct family of sponges in the class Hexactinellida (glass sponges) and the subclass Amphidiscophora. Hemidiscellidae (sometimes known as Microhemidisciidae) is the only family in the order Hemidiscosa.

Hemidiscosans are differentiated by the form of their microscleres. Their microscleres, more precisely known as hemidiscs, have the form of a rod with a large umbel (hooked whorl) at one end and a much smaller umbel on the other end. This form of microsclere is intermediate between paraclavules (basic rods present in many sponges) and amphidiscs (rods with umbels of equal size, found in the order Amphidiscosida).
