= Sponge Reef Project =

Joint German-Canadian scientific project

The Sponge Reef Project is a binational scientific project between Germany and Canada to study the sponge reefs off British Columbia, Canada, formed by sponges of the Hexactinellid family.

The project was started in 1999, following the discovery of the reefs in 1991; earlier, this reef type was thought to have existed mainly in the Jurassic period.
