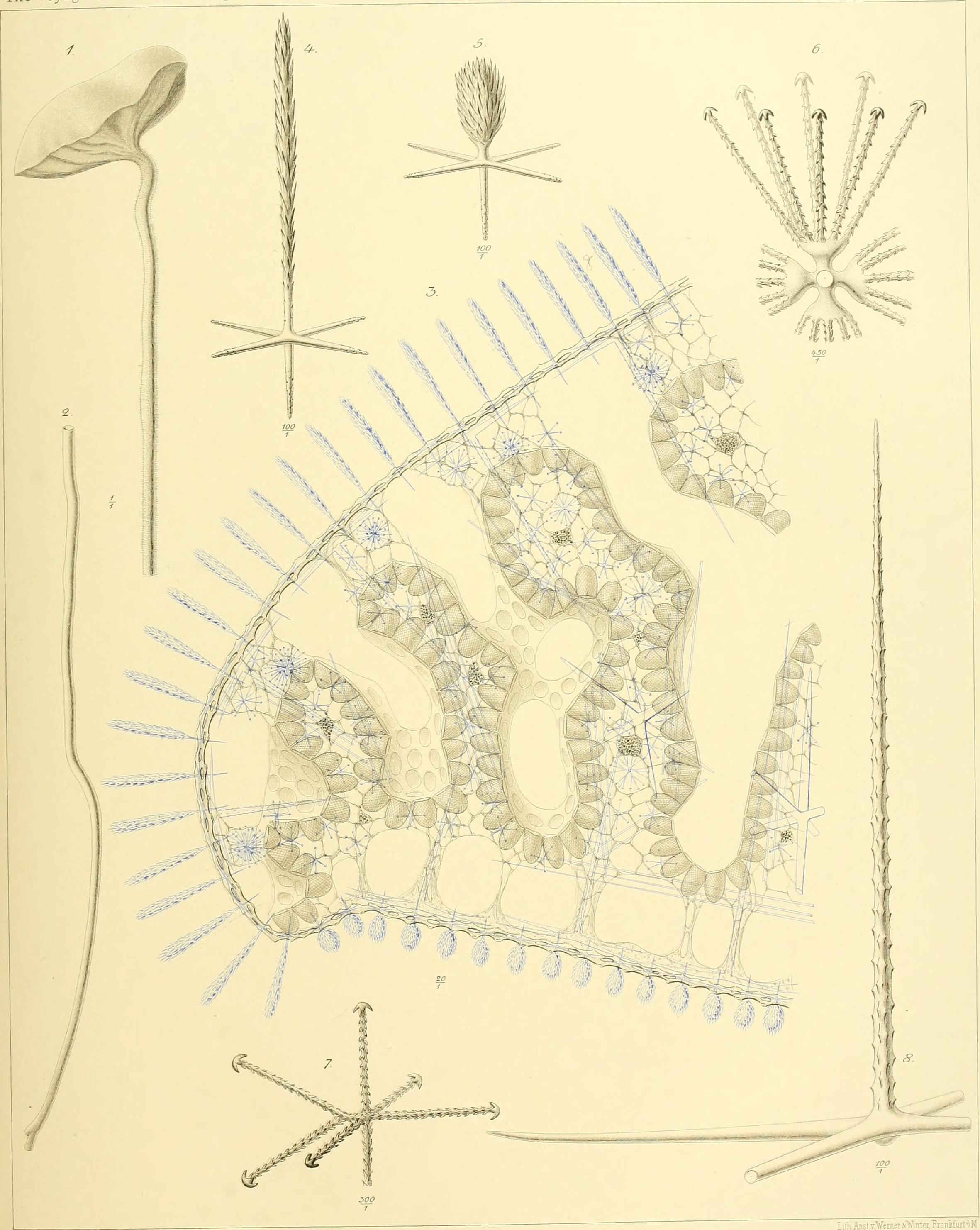
- Caulophacus elegans, illustration in: Report on the scientific results of the voyage of H.M.S. Challenger during the years 1873-76 - under the command of Captain George S. Nares, R.N., F.R.S. and Captain Frank Turle Thomson, R.N. (1887).

Scientific classification
- Kingdom: Animalia
- Phylum: Porifera
- Class: Hexactinellida
- Order: Lyssacinosida
- Family: Rossellidae
- Subfamily: Lanuginellinae; Gray, 1872

Genera
- Calycosoma; Caulophacus; Doconesthes; Lanuginella; Lanugonychia; Lophocalyx; Mellonympha; Sympagella

Synonyms
- Sympagellidae De Laubenfels, 1936

= Lanuginellinae =

Subfamily of sponges

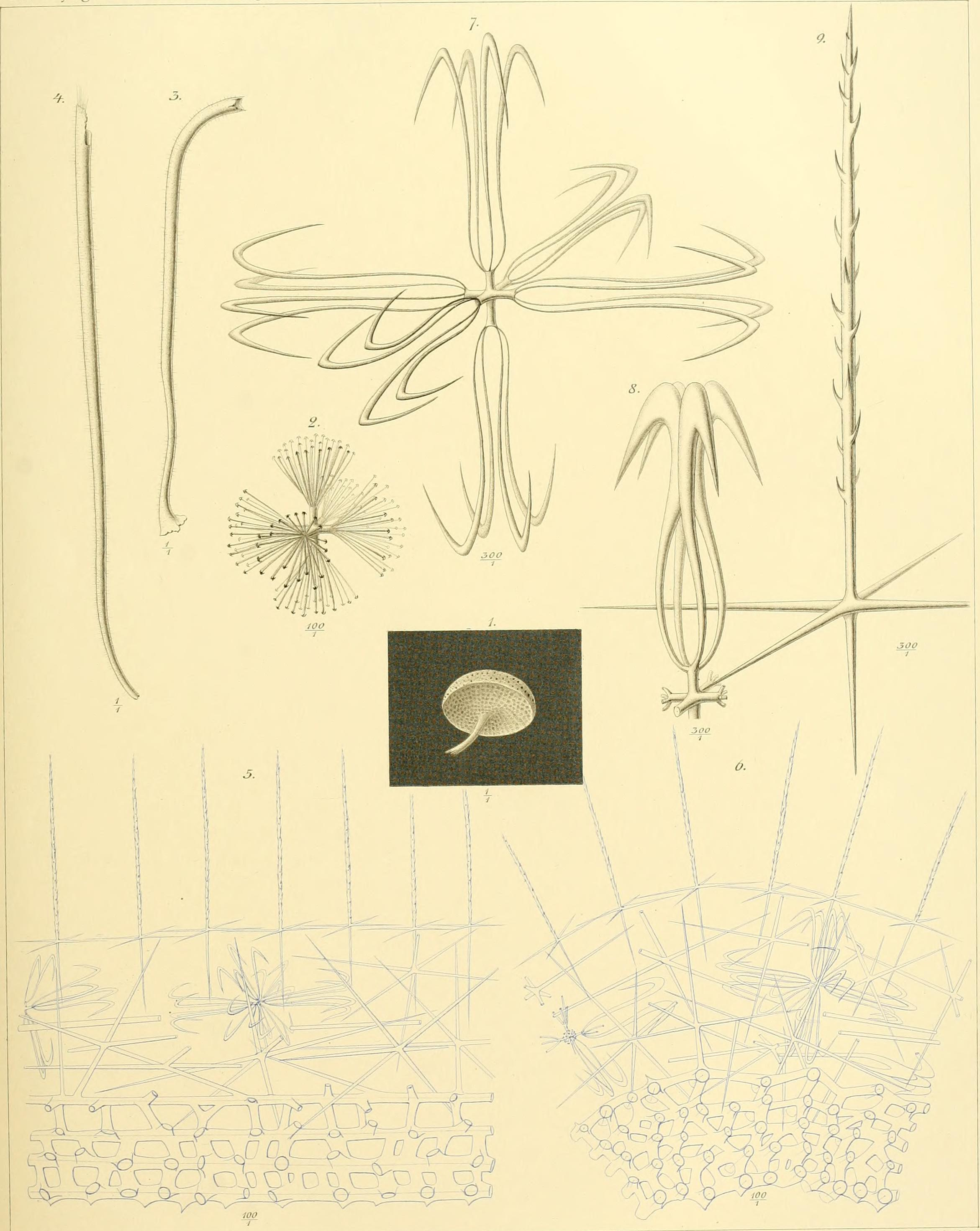
Caulophacus elegans, illustration in: Report on the scientific results of the voyage of H.M.S. Challenger during the years 1873-76 - under the command of Captain George S. Nares, R.N., F.R.S. and Captain Frank Turle Thomson, R.N. (1887).

Lanuginellinae is a subfamily of glass sponges belonging to the family Rossellidae.
