= Leucopsacidae =

Scientific classification
- Kingdom: Animalia
- Phylum: Porifera
- Class: Hexactinellida
- Order: Lyssacinosida
- Family: Leucopsacidae; Ijima, 1903

Genera
- Chaunoplectella; Leucopsacus; Oopsacas

Family of sponges

Leucopsacidae is a family of glass sponges belonging to the order Lyssacinosa.
