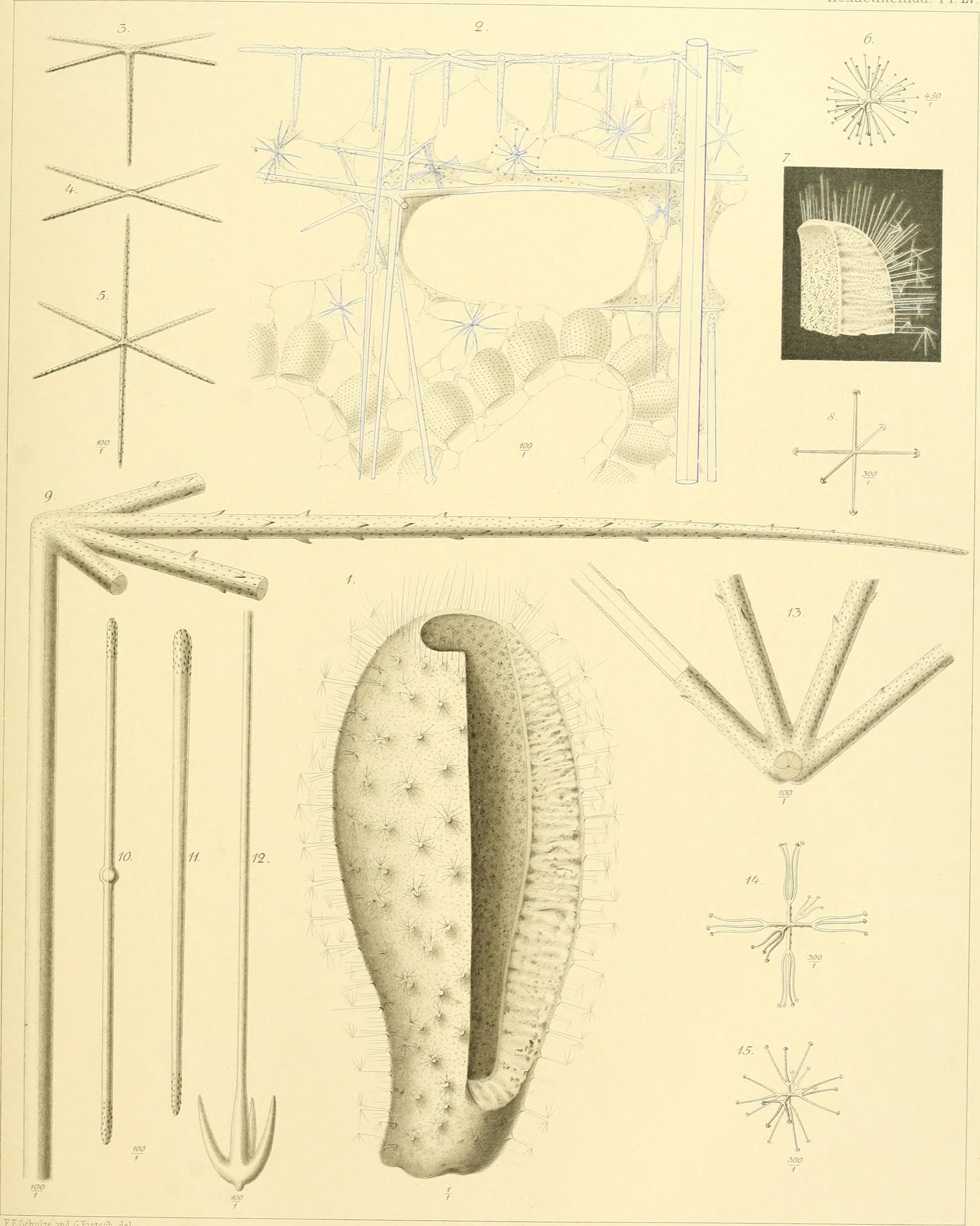
- Rossella antarctica, illustration in: Report on the scientific results of the voyage of H.M.S. Challenger during the years 1873-76 : under the command of Captain George S. Nares, R.N., F.R.S. and Captain Frank Turle Thomson, R.N. 1887

Scientific classification
- Kingdom: Animalia
- Phylum: Porifera
- Class: Hexactinellida
- Order: Lyssacinosida
- Family: Rossellidae; Schulze, 1885

Subfamilies
- Acanthascinae; Lanuginellinae; Rossellinae

= Rossellidae =

Rossellidae Temporal range: Hirnantian–Recent

Family of sponges

Rossellidae is a family of glass sponges belonging to the order Lyssacinosa. The family has a cosmopolitan distribution and is found at a large range of depths (8–6,770 m (26–22,211 ft), and likely deeper).

== Description ==
The body is usually a cup-like structure. In stalked forms the body can be mushroom-like. Spicules protruding beyond the sponge surface, when present, are diactines (spicules with two pointed arms) or specialised outwardly protruding hypodermal pentactines (five pointed spicules).

The choanosomal skeleton consists of diactines, sometimes together with less frequent hexactines (spicules with six prongs). A large variety of microscleres occur in this family, including a variety of holactinoidal and asterous spicules.

== Subfamilies and genera ==
As of 2017, WoRMS recognizes three subfamilies and twenty-six genera in the family:

- Subfamily Acanthascinae Schulze, 1897
  - Acanthascus Schulze, 1886
  - Rhabdocalyptus Schulze, 1886
  - Staurocalyptus Ijima, 1897
- Subfamily Lanuginellinae Gray, 1872
  - Calycosoma Schulze, 1899
  - Caulophacus Schulze, 1886
  - Doconesthes Topsent, 1928
  - Lanuginella Schmidt, 1870
  - Lanugonychia Lendenfeld, 1915
  - Lophocalyx Schulze, 1887
  - Mellonympha Schulze, 1897
  - Sympagella Schmidt, 1870
- Subfamily Rossellinae Schulze, 1885
  - Anoxycalyx Kirkpatrick, 1907
  - Aphorme Schulze, 1899
  - Asconema Kent, 1870
  - Aulosaccus Ijima, 1896
  - Bathydorus Schulze, 1886
  - Crateromorpha Gray in Carter, 1872
  - Hyalascus Ijima, 1896
  - Nodastrella Dohrmann, Göcke, Reed & Janussen, 2012
  - Rossella Carter, 1872
  - Schaudinnia Schulze, 1900
  - Scyphidium Schulze, 1900
  - Symplectella Dendy, 1924
  - Trichasterina Schulze, 1900
  - Vazella Gray, 1870
  - Vitrollula Ijima, 1898
