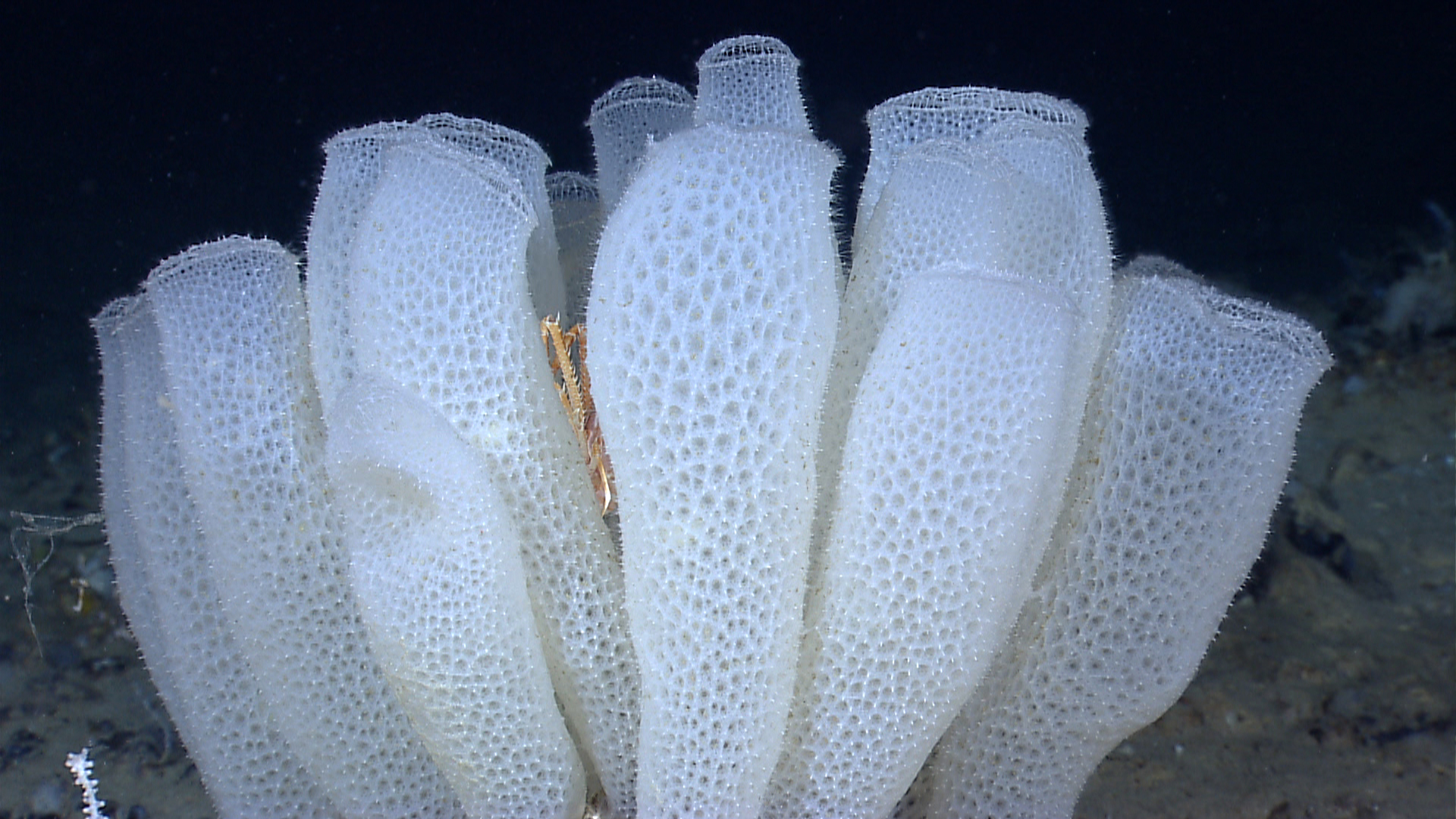
- Venus flower basket (Euplectella aspergillum, family Euplectellidae)

Scientific classification
- Kingdom: Animalia
- Phylum: Porifera
- Class: Hexactinellida
- Subclass: Hexasterophora
- Order: Lyssacinosida; Zittel, 1877

Subgroups
- See text.

Synonyms
- Lyssacinosa

= Lyssacinosida =

Lyssacinosida Temporal range: 444 – 0 Ma

Order of sponges

Lyssacinosida (also spelled Lyssacinosa) is an order of glass sponges (Hexactinellida) belonging to the subclass Hexasterophora. These sponges can be recognized by their parenchymal spicules usually being unconnected, unlike in other sponges in the subclass where the spicules form a more or less tightly connected skeleton. Lyssacine sponges have existed since the Upper Ordovician, and three families (four including Aulocalycidae) are still alive today. The Venus' flower basket (Euplectella aspergillum) is one of the most well-known and culturally significant of the glass sponges.

== Subgroups ==
- Family Aulocalycidae? Ijima, 1927 [Upper Jurassic–present]
- Family †Brachiospongiidae Beecher, 1889 [Upper Ordovician–Silurian (Ludlow)]
- Family Euplectellidae Gray,1867 [Upper Ordovician–present]
- Family Leucopsacidae Ijima, 1903 [Paleogene (Eocene)–present]
- Family †Malumispongiidae Rigby, 1967 [Upper Ordovician–Carboniferous (Tournaisian)]
- Family Rossellidae Schulze, 1885 [Upper Ordovician–present]
- Incertae sedis Genera
  - †Calycomorpha Bodzioch, 1993 [Triassic]
  - Clathrochone Tabachnick, 2002 [present]
  - †Crepospongia Finks & Rigby, 2004 [Upper Triassic (Carnian)]
  - †Gomphites Carter, 1871 [Lower Cretaceous]
  - Hyaloplacoida Tabachnick, 1989 [present]
  - †Krainerella? Krainer & Mostler, 1992 [Middle Triassic]
  - †Lumectospongia Rigby & Chatterton, 1989 [Silurian (Ludlow)]
  - †Opeamorphus de Laubenfels, 1955 [Ordovician–Carboniferous]
  - †Pyritonema? Mc'Coy, 1850 [Silurian]
  - †Pyruspongia Rigby, 1971 [Upper Ordovician]
  - †Stauractinella de Laubenfels, 1955 [Late Jurassic (Oxfordian)–Neogene]
  - †Toomeyospongia Rigby, Horrocks, & Cys, 1982 [Permian (Guadalupian)]
  - †Trimonactinophora Wu & Xiao, 1989 [Triassic]

== Sources ==
- Identification key for Lyssacinosa
