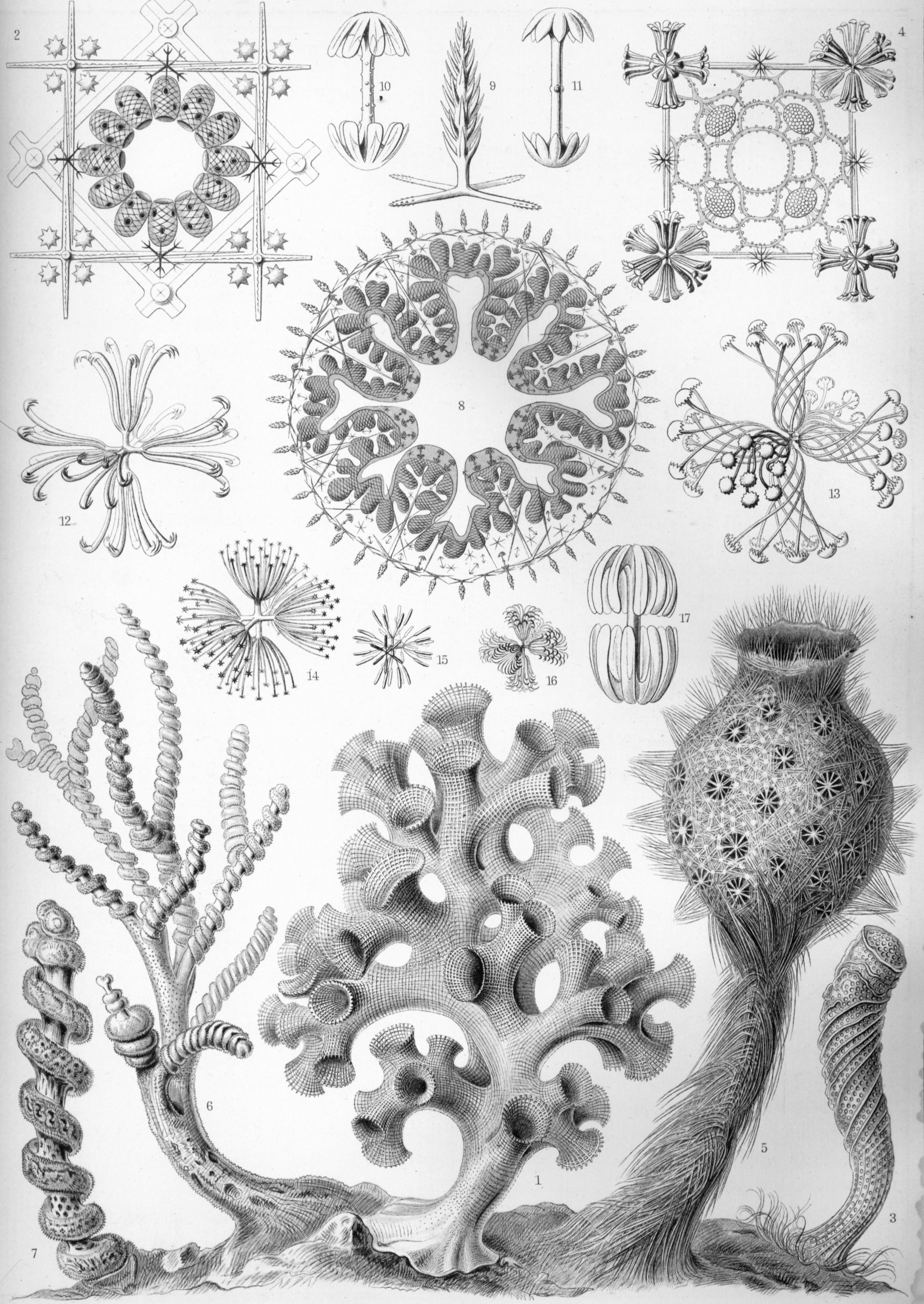
- "Hexactinellae" from Ernst Haeckel's Kunstformen der Natur, 1904

Scientific classification
- Kingdom: Animalia
- Phylum: Porifera
- Class: Hexactinellida; Schmidt, 1870

Subgroups
- See text.

Synonyms
- Hyalospongiae

= Hexactinellid =

Glass sponges Temporal range: Late Ediacaran–present

Class of sponges with siliceous spicules

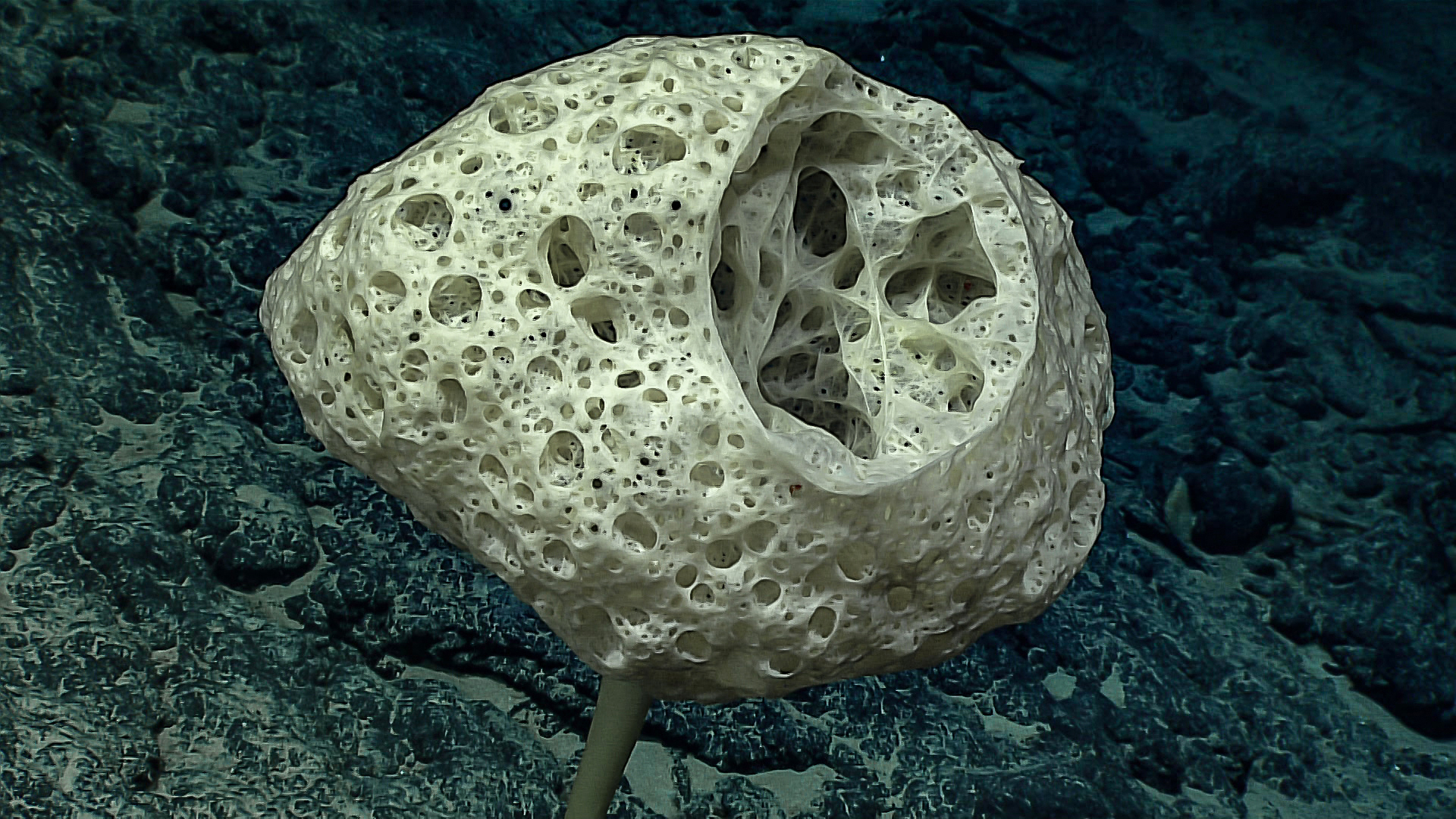
Bolosoma stalked glass sponge

Hexactinellid sponges are sponges with a skeleton made of four- and/or six-pointed siliceous spicules, often referred to as glass sponges. They are usually classified along with other sponges in the phylum Porifera, but some researchers consider them sufficiently distinct to deserve their own phylum, Symplasma. Some marine biologists believe that glass sponges are the longest-lived animals on earth; these scientists tentatively estimate a maximum age of up to 15,000 years.

== Biology ==
Glass sponges are relatively uncommon and are mostly found at depths from 450 to 900 metres (1,480 to 2,950 ft) below sea level. Although the species Oopsacas minuta has been found in shallow water, others have been found much deeper. They are found in all oceans of the world, although they are particularly common in Antarctic and Northern Pacific waters.

They are more-or-less cup-shaped animals, ranging from 10 to 30 centimetres (3.9 to 11.8 in) in height, with sturdy skeletons made of glass-like silica spicules, fused to form a lattice. In some glass sponges such as members of the genus Euplectella, these structures are aided by a protein called glassin. It helps accelerate the production of silicas from the silicic acid absorbed from the surrounding seawater. The body is relatively symmetrical, with a large central cavity that, in many species, opens to the outside through a sieve formed from the skeleton. Some species of glass sponges are capable of fusing together to create reefs or bioherms. They are generally pale in colour, ranging from white to orange.

Much of the body is composed of syncitial tissue, extensive regions of multinucleate cytoplasm. The epidermal cells characteristic of other sponges are absent, being replaced by a syncitial net of amoebocytes, through which the spicules penetrate. Unlike other sponges, they do not possess the ability to contract.

Their body comprises three parts: the inner and outer peripheral trabecular networks and the choanosome, which is used for feeding purposes. The choanosome acts as the mouth for the sponge while the inner and outer canals that meet at the choanosome are passages for the food, creating a consumption path for the sponge.

All hexactinellids have the potential to grow to different sizes, but the average maximum growth is estimated to be around 32 centimeters long. Some grow past that length and continue to extend their lengths up to 1 meter. The estimated life expectancy for hexactinellids that grow around 1 meter is approximately 200 years (Plyes).

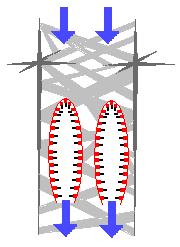
The glass sponge Euplectella. Water flow Main syncitium Spicules Choanosyncitium and collar bodies showing interior

Glass sponges possess a unique system for rapidly conducting electrical impulses across their bodies, making it possible for them to respond quickly to external stimuli. In the case Rhabdocalyptus dawsoni, the sponge uses electrical neuron signaling to detect outside stimuli, such as sediments, and then send a signal through its body system to alert the organism to no longer be actively feeding. Another glass sponge species in the same experiment of R. dawsoni showed that the electrical conduction system for this class of sponges has its own threshold of how much outside stimuli, sediments, etc., it can endure before it will stop its feeding process. Species like Venus' flower basket have a tuft of fibers that extends outward like an inverted crown at the bases of their skeletons. These fibers are 50 to 175 millimetres (2.0 to 6.9 in) long and about the thickness of a human hair.

=== Syncytia ===
Bodies of glass sponges are different from those of other sponges in various other ways. For example, most of their cytoplasm is not divided into separate cells by membranes, but forms a syncytium or continuous mass of cytoplasm with many nuclei (e.g., Reiswig and Mackie, 1983); it is held suspended like a cobweb by a scaffolding-like framework made of silica spicules. The remaining cells are connected to the syncytium by bridges of cytoplasmic "rivers" that transport nuclei, organelles, and other substances. Instead of choanocytes, these bridges have further syncytia, known as choanosyncytia, which form bell-shaped chambers where water enters via perforations. The insides of these chambers are lined with "collar bodies", each consisting of a collar and flagellum but without a nucleus of its own. The motion of the flagella sucks water through passages in the "cobweb" and expels it via the open ends of the bell-shaped chambers.

Some types of cells have a single nucleus and membrane each but are connected to other single-nucleus cells and to the main syncytium by "bridges" made of cytoplasm. The sclerocytes that build spicules have multiple nuclei, and in glass sponge larvae they are connected to other tissues by cytoplasm bridges; such connections between sclerocytes have not so far been found in adults, but this may simply reflect the difficulty of investigating such small-scale features. The bridges are controlled by "plugged junctions" that apparently permit some substances to pass while blocking others.

This physiology is what allows for a greater flow of ions and electrical signals to move throughout the organism, with around 75% of the sponge tissue being fused in this way. Another way is their role in the nutrient cycles of deep-sea environments. One species for example, Vazella pourtalesii, has an abundance of symbiotic microbes which aid in the nitrification and denitrification of their communities. These interactions help the sponges survive in the low-oxygen conditions of the depths.

=== Longevity ===
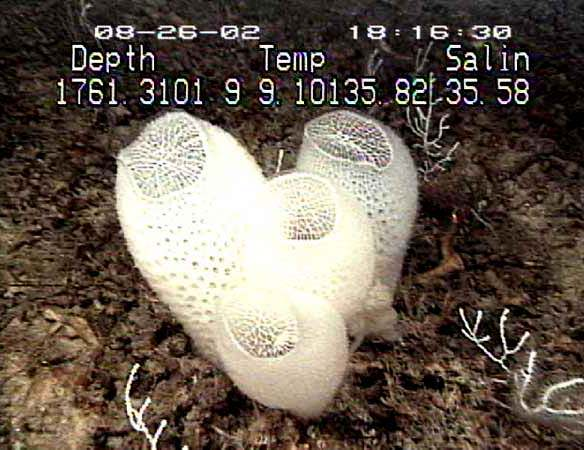
Venus' flower basket, Euplectella aspergillum

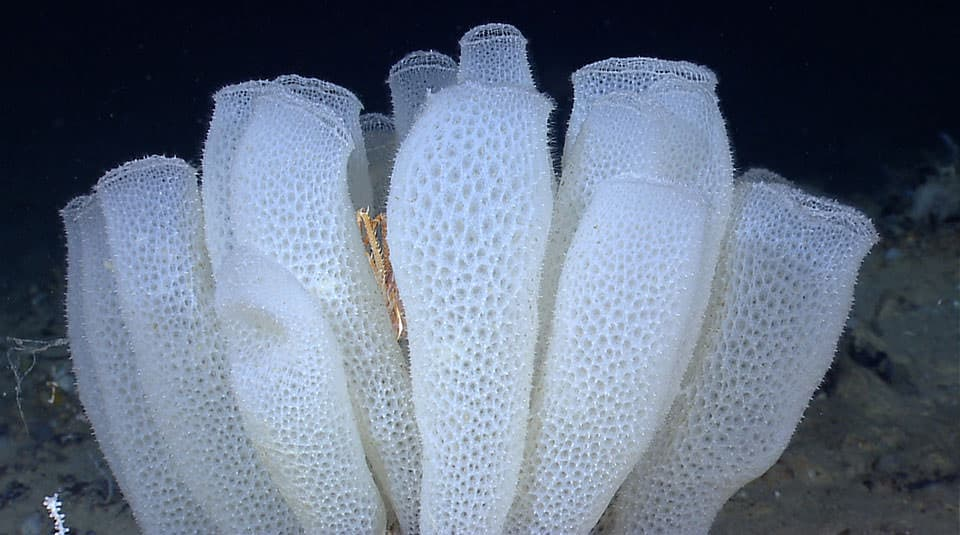
Euplectella aspergillum

These creatures are long-lived, but the exact age is hard to measure; one study based on modelling gave an estimated age of a specimen of Scolymastra joubini as 23,000 years (with a range from 13,000 to 40,000 years). However, due to changes in sea levels since the Last Glacial Maximum, its maximum age is thought to be no more than 15,000 years, hence its listing of c. 15,000 years in the AnAge Database. The shallow-water occurrence of hexactinellids is rare worldwide. In the Antarctic, two species occur as shallow as 33 meters under the ice. In the Mediterranean, one species occurs as shallow as 18 metres (59 ft) in a cave with deep-water upwelling (Boury-Esnault & Vacelet (1994))

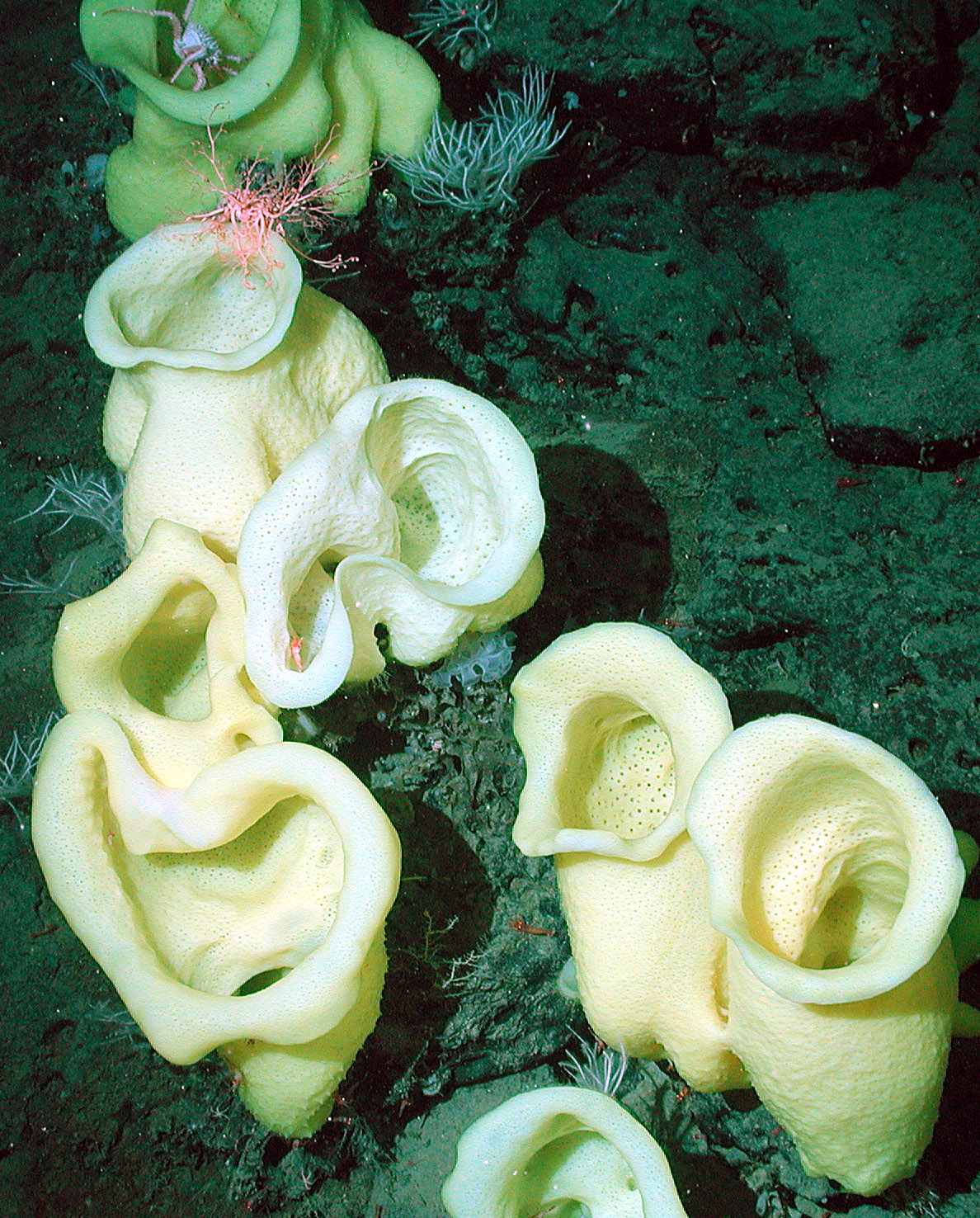
Staurocalyptus sp.

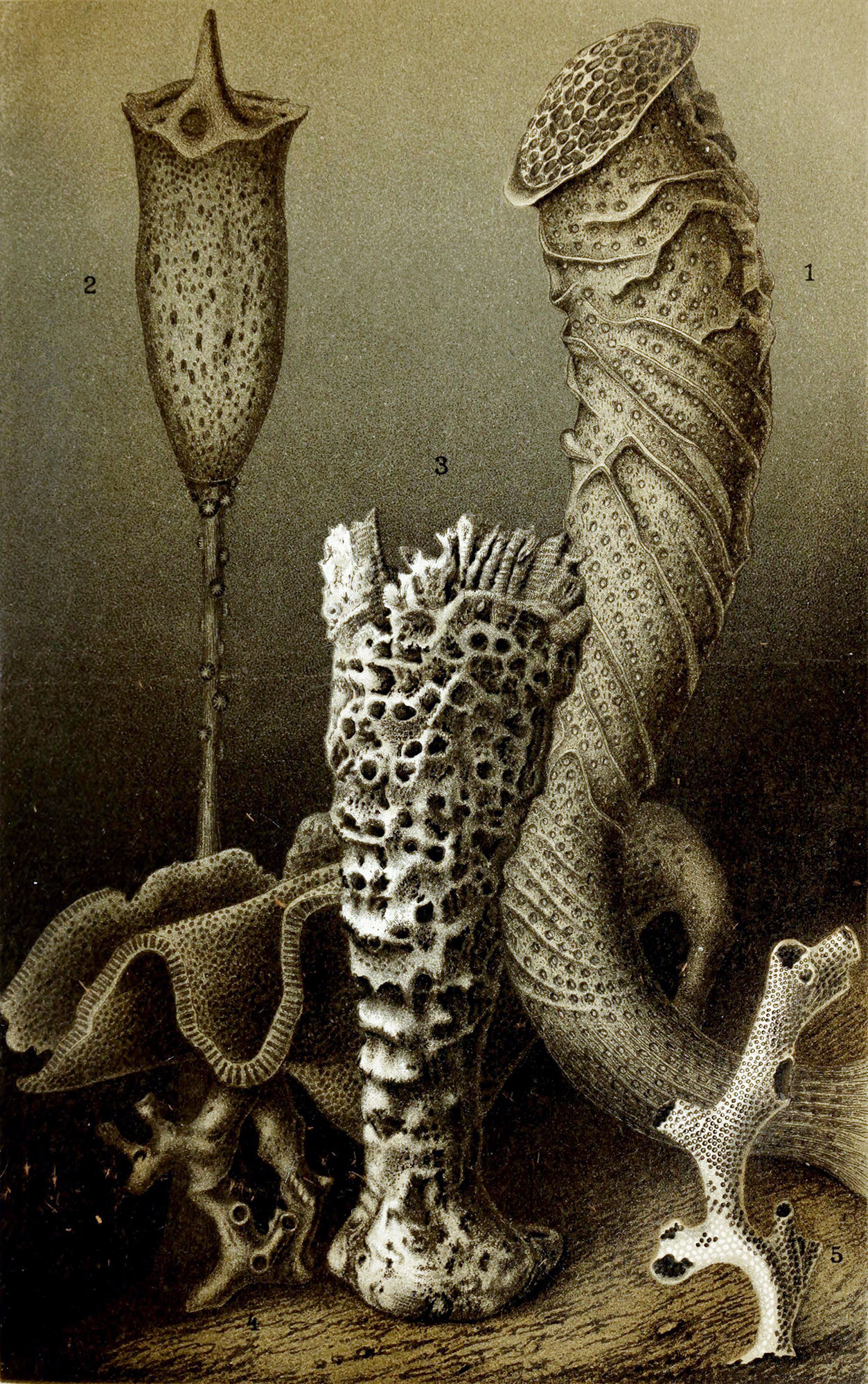
Various hexactinellid sponges.

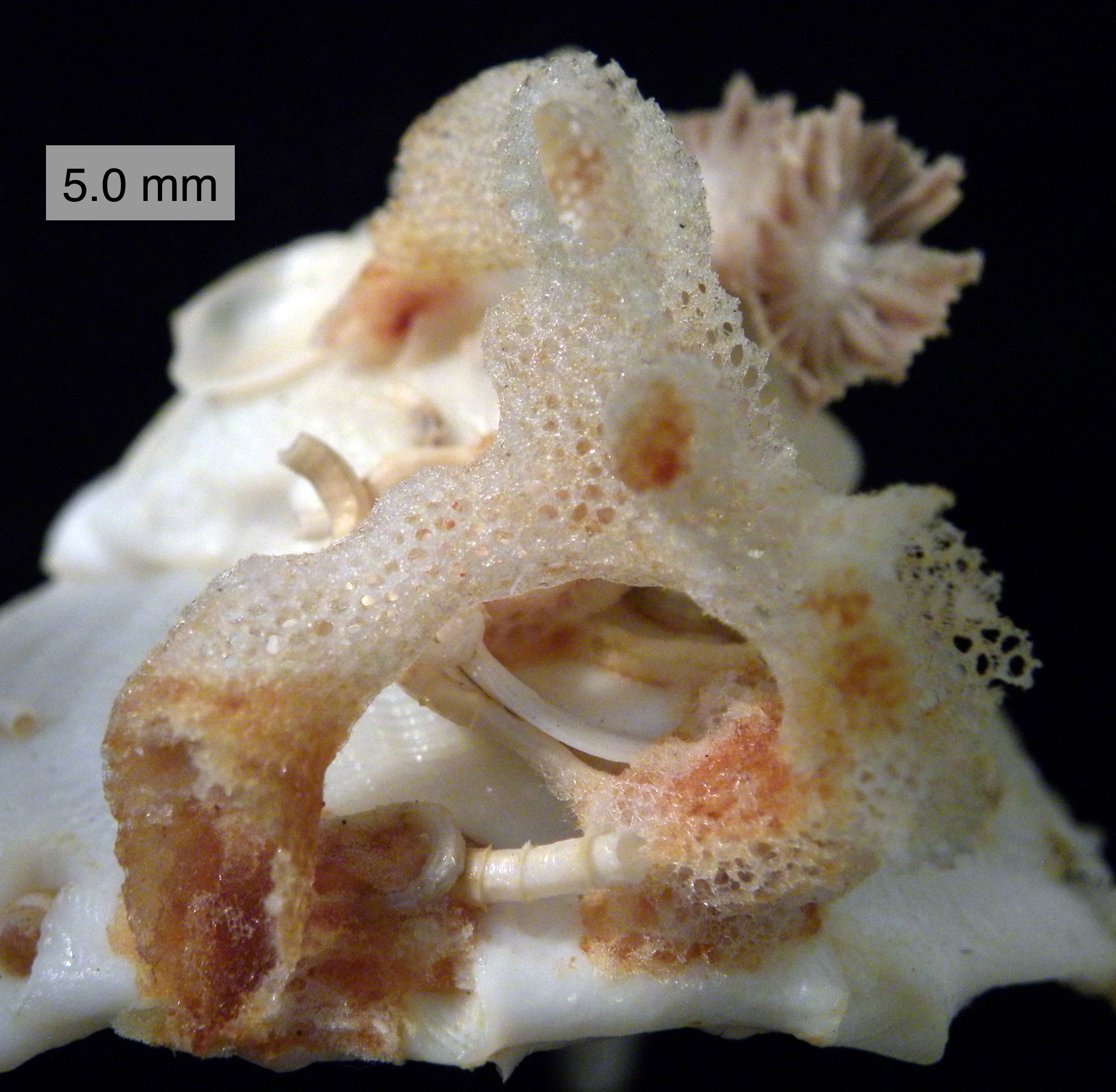
Hexactinellid sponge on a xenophorid gastropod.

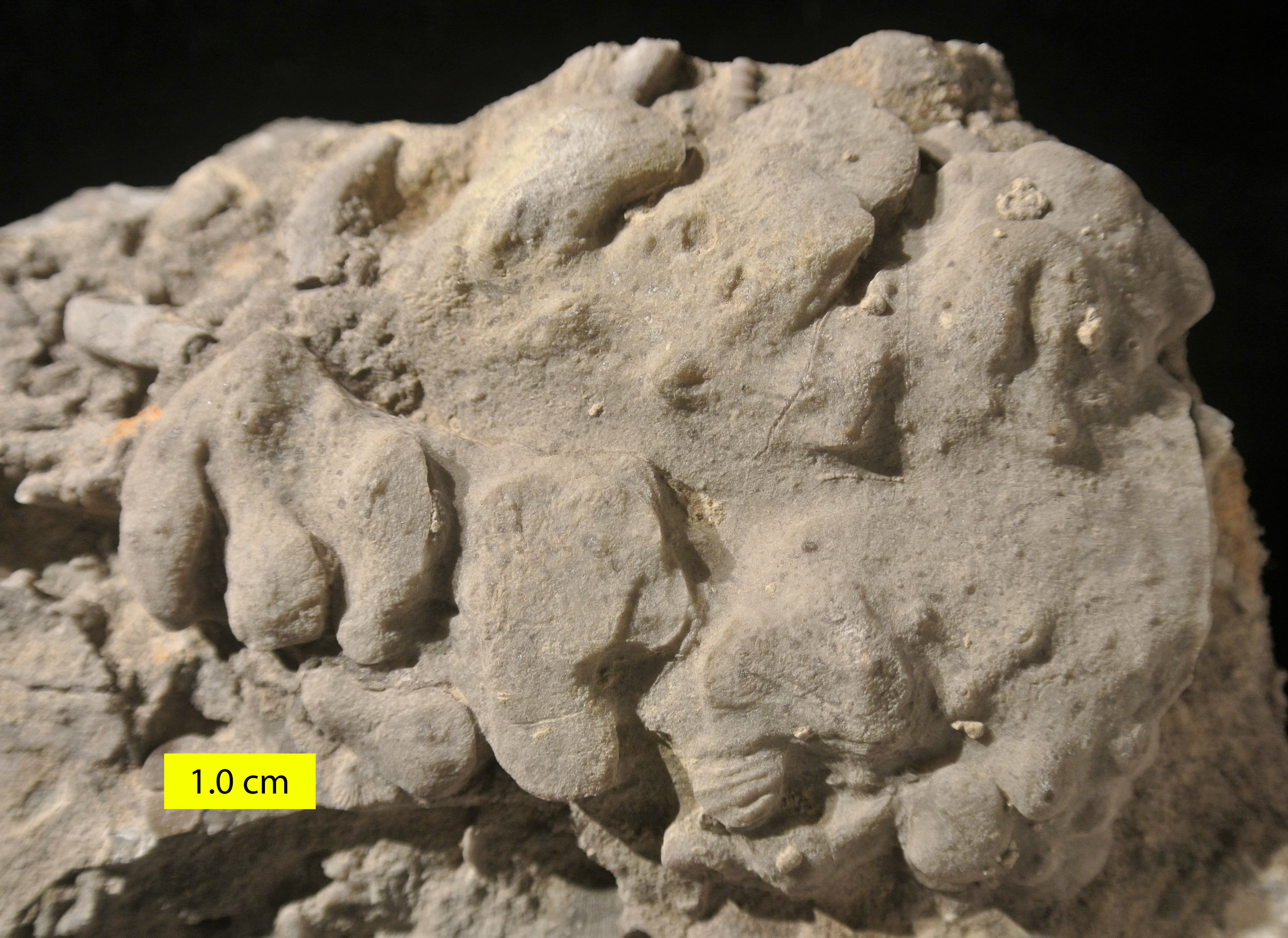
Pattersonia ulrichi Rauff, 1894; an Ordovician hexactinellid sponge from near Cincinnati, Ohio.

== Reefs ==
The sponges form reefs (called sponge reefs) off the coast of British Columbia, Southeast Alaska, and Washington state, which are studied by the Sponge Reef Project. In the case of Sarostegia oculata, this species almost always hosts symbiotic zoanthids, which cause the hexactinellid sponge to imitate the appearance and structure of coral reefs. Only 33 species of this sponge were reported in the South Atlantic until 2017 when the submersible Shinka 6500 went on an expedition through the Rio Grande Rise. Reefs discovered in Hecate Strait, British Columbia, have grown to up to 7 kilometres (4.3 mi; 3.8 nmi) long and 20 metres (66 feet) high. Prior to these discoveries, sponge reefs were thought to have died out in the Jurassic period.

Reports of glass sponges have also been recorded on the wrecks of HMCS Saskatchewan and HMCS Cape Breton off the coast of Vancouver Island. Species of zoantharin that rely on hexactinellids have also been found off the coast of the Japanese island of Minamitorishima (Marcus Island). Unidentified species of zoanthids have also been found in Australian waters; if these are identified as the same as the ones found in Minamitorishima, it could be evidence of hexactinellids existing in all of the Pacific Ocean.

== Conservation ==
Most hexactinellids live in deep waters that are not impacted by human activities. However, there are glass-sponge reefs off the coast of British Columbia. The Canadian government designated 2,140 square kilometres (826 sq mi) of the Hecate Strait and Queen Charlotte Sound as the Hecate Strait and Queen Charlotte Sound Glass Sponge Reefs Marine Protected Area. This area contains four glass sponge reefs. The new regulations prohibit bottom-contact fishing within 200 metres (656 ft) of the sponge reefs. Although human activities only affect a small portion of glass sponges, they are still subject to the threat of climate change. Experiments using the species Aphrocallistes vastus have shown that increases in temperature and acidification can lead to weakened skeletal strength and stiffness. In 1995, an Antarctic ice shelf collapsed due to climate change. Since then, studies of the area have shown that hexactinellid reefs have been increasing in size despite the changes in climate.

== Evolution and taxonomy ==
The earliest known hexactinellids are from the earliest Cambrian or late Neoproterozoic eras; Helicolocellus is a possible hexactinellid relative from the late Ediacaran. They are fairly common relative to demosponges as fossils, but this is thought to be, at least in part, because their spicules are sturdier than spongin and fossilize better. Like almost all sponges, the hexactinellids draw water in through a series of small pores by the whip-like beating of a series of hairs or flagella in chambers which in this group line the sponge wall.

The class is divided into two subclasses and several orders:

Class Hexactinellida

- Subclass Amphidiscophora
  - Order Amphidiscosida
  - Order †Hemidiscosa
  - Order †Reticulosa
- Subclass Hexasterophora
  - Order Lychniscosida
  - Order Lyssacinosida
  - Order Sceptrulophora

== See also ==
- Sponge reef
- Cloud sponge
- Sponge Reef Project
- Glass sponge shrimp
