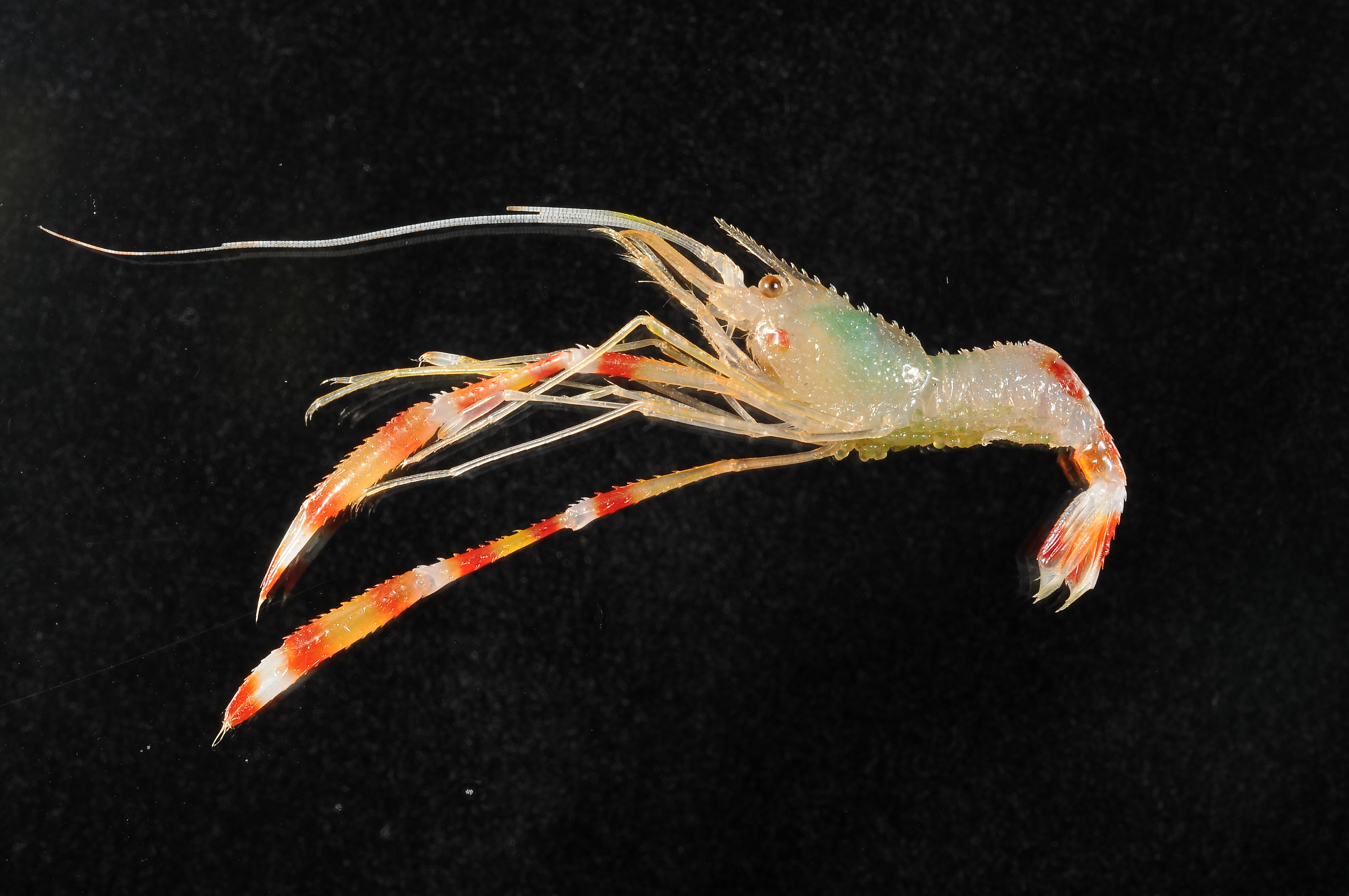

Scientific classification
- Kingdom: Animalia
- Phylum: Arthropoda
- Clade: Pancrustacea
- Class: Malacostraca
- Order: Decapoda
- Suborder: Pleocyemata
- Family: Stenopodidae
- Genus: Stenopus
- Species: S. scutellatus

Binomial name
- Stenopus scutellatus Rankin, 1898

= Stenopus scutellatus =

Species of crustacean

Stenopus scutellatus, commonly known as the gold coral banded shrimp or golden coral shrimp, is a boxer shrimp, a shrimp-like decapod crustacean belonging to the family Stenopodidae. It is found in suitable habitats in the western Atlantic and the Caribbean Sea.

== Description ==
Stenopus spinosus can grow up to 4 centimetres (1.6 in) long, and has a yellow spiny carapace and abdomen and long white antennae. The third pair of pereiopods (walking legs) are spiny and bear long claws and are much larger than the other pairs. They are boldly barred in red and white while the other legs are yellow. The tip of the abdomen, uropods and telson are also marked with orangeish-red and white.

== Distribution ==
Stenopus scutellatus is commonly found in shallow waters in the western Atlantic Ocean, Bermuda, the West Indies, the Gulf of Mexico and southwards to northern Brazil at depths between 10 and 113 metres (33 and 371 ft). They are found on coral reefs, in caves and among lumps of coral but are also found on rocks near turtle grass (Thalassia testudinum) meadows and on detritus on the seabed.

== Behaviour ==
These shrimps are usually found in pairs, one of each sex, and have elaborate mating behaviours. They lurk in crevices with their long antennae visible and waving to advertise their presence. They offer cleaning services to fish which will approach and adopt special attitudes while parasites, such as isopods, and pieces of dead skin are removed and eaten by the shrimp. They are rather more shy than the banded cleaner shrimp (Stenopus hispidus) and approach the fishes that attend the cleaning station more cautiously. They sometimes just remain inside their niches picking at the side of the visiting fish immediately outside.
