= Juxtastenopus =

Scientific classification
- Domain: Eukaryota
- Kingdom: Animalia
- Phylum: Arthropoda
- Class: Malacostraca
- Order: Decapoda
- Suborder: Pleocyemata
- Family: Stenopodidae
- Genus: Juxtastenopus; Goy, 2010
- Species: J. spinulatus

Binomial name
- Juxtastenopus spinulatus (Holthuis, 1946)

Synonyms
- Engystenopus spinulatus Holthuis, 1946

Genus of crustaceans

Juxtastenopus spinulatus is a species of stenopodidean shrimp. It lives in the Red Sea, and across the Indian Ocean as far east as the Philippines. It is red or pink, up to 28 mm (1.1 in) long, with enlarged third pereiopods. Originally described in the genus Engystenopus, it is now placed in the monotypic genus Juxtastenopus, in the family Stenopodidae.

== Description ==
Juxtastenopus grows to a total body length of 17.4–28.0 millimetres (0.69–1.10 in) long (carapace length: 4.6–8.8 mm or 0.18–0.35 in). In life, the animals are red or pinkish, but with white tips to the chelae (claws) on the enlarged third pereiopods (walking legs). Females are reproductive at lengths around 6.1–7.6 mm (0.24–0.30 in), and carry between 27 and 132 eggs, each initially 0.30 mm × 0.49 mm (0.012 in × 0.019 in) in diameter.

== Distribution ==
Most specimens of J. spinulatus have been collected from the Red Sea at depths of 434–778 metres (1,424–2,552 ft), where the water is warm. That warm water mass drops to a depth of 1,000 m (3,300 ft) on passing through the Bab-el-Mandeb strait into the Gulf of Aden, and J. spinulatus has also been collected at a depth of 1,068 m (3,504 ft) in the Gulf of Aden. It also occurs in the Indian Ocean, and as far east as Hong Kong and the Philippines, but occurs in much shallower water than in the Red Sea.

== Taxonomy ==
The earliest discovered specimens of J. spinulatus were assigned by Heinrich Balss to the species Stenopus spinosus. Its first description as a separate species was the type description by Lipke Holthuis in 1946, where it was given the name Engystenopus spinulatus. This was based on a single damaged holotype male, collected in the Lobetoli Strait, east of Flores, Indonesia, and the placement in the genus Engystenopus was considered questionable. The most distinctive characteristics of Engystenopus are characters of the third pereiopod, which was lacking from all the early specimens. When specimens with intact third pereiopods became available, Joseph Goy realised that "E. spinulatus" did not belong in the same genus as E. palmipes (the only other species of Engystenopus), and erected a new genus, Juxtastenopus, to hold it. The two genera are now placed in different families, although both names carry the meaning "close to Stenopus"; Engystenopus is one of seven extant genera in the family Spongicolidae, while Juxtastenopus is one of four extant genera in the family Stenopodidae.
