= Chonelasma =

Scientific classification
- Kingdom: Animalia
- Phylum: Porifera
- Class: Hexactinellida
- Order: Sceptrulophora
- Family: Euretidae
- Subfamily: Chonelasmatinae
- Genus: Chonelasma; Schulze, 1886

Genus of sponges

Chonelasma is a genus of sea sponge in the family Euretidae.

== Species ==
According to the World Register of Marine Species, the following species are accepted within Chonelasma:

- Chonelasma australe Reiswig & Kelly, 2011
- Chonelasma biscopulatum Reiswig & Kelly, 2011
- Chonelasma bispinula Kersken, Janussen & Martínez Arbizu, 2019
- Chonelasma chathamense Reiswig & Kelly, 2011
- Chonelasma choanoides Schulze & Kirkpatrick, 1910
- Chonelasma doederleini Schulze, 1886
- Chonelasma glaciale Reiswig & Kelly, 2011
- Chonelasma hamatum Schulze, 1886
- Chonelasma ijimai Topsent, 1901
- Chonelasma lamella Schulze, 1886
- Chonelasma oreia Reiswig, 2014
