= Farrea truncata =

Scientific classification
- Kingdom: Animalia
- Phylum: Porifera
- Class: Hexactinellida
- Order: Sceptrulophora
- Family: Farreidae
- Genus: Farrea
- Species: F. truncata

Binomial name
- Farrea truncata Reiswig, 2014

Species of sponge

Farrea truncata is a species of sea sponge first found at the bottom of shelf, canyon and seamounts of the west coast of Washington, British Columbia and the Gulf of Alaska.
