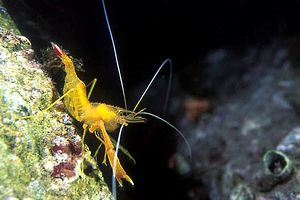

Scientific classification
- Domain: Eukaryota
- Kingdom: Animalia
- Phylum: Arthropoda
- Class: Malacostraca
- Order: Decapoda
- Suborder: Pleocyemata
- Family: Stenopodidae
- Genus: Stenopus
- Species: S. spinosus

Binomial name
- Stenopus spinosus Risso, 1827

Synonyms
- Byzenus scaber Rafinesque, 1814

= Stenopus spinosus =

Species of crustacean

Stenopus spinosus is a shrimp-like decapod crustacean belonging to the infraorder Stenopodidea.

== Description ==
Stenopus spinosus can grow up to 8 centimetres (3.1 in) long, and is chiefly yellow, with white antennae and white tips to the chelae (claws). The uropods and telson have red tips.

== Distribution ==
Stenopus spinosus is commonly found in shallow waters in the Mediterranean Sea, and at greater depths in adjacent parts of the Atlantic Ocean. It is frequently encountered on night dives in parts of its range. A record of S. spinosus from the Red Sea proved to be a different species, Engystenopus spinulatus.
