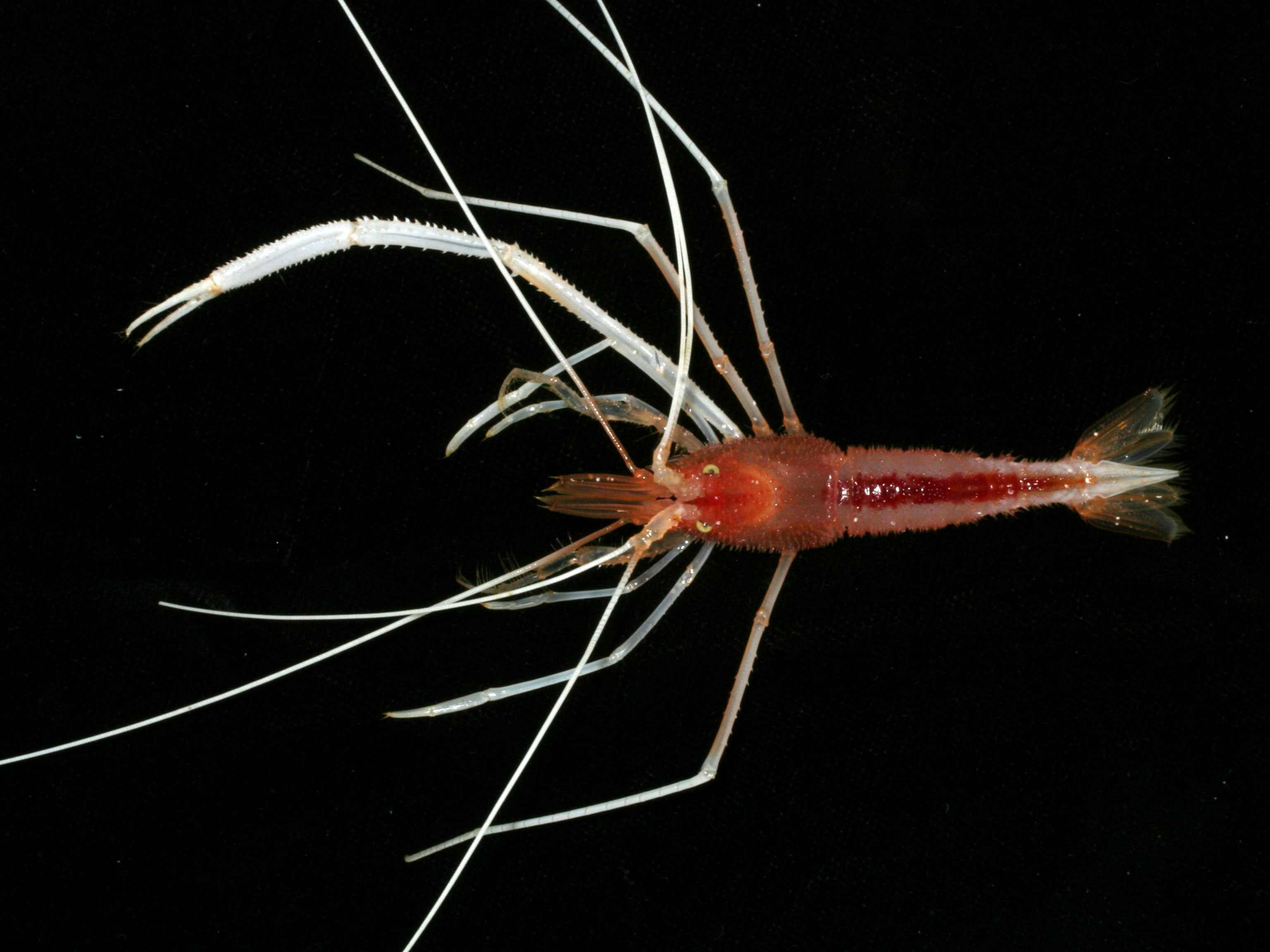

Scientific classification
- Kingdom: Animalia
- Phylum: Arthropoda
- Clade: Pancrustacea
- Class: Malacostraca
- Order: Decapoda
- Suborder: Pleocyemata
- Family: Stenopodidae
- Genus: Stenopus
- Species: S. pyrsonotus

Binomial name
- Stenopus pyrsonotus Goy & Devaney, 1980

= Stenopus pyrsonotus =

Species of crustacean

Stenopus pyrsonotus is a shrimp-like decapod crustacean belonging to the infraorder Stenopodidea, native to the Indo-West Pacific region. Common names include flameback coral shrimp, ghost boxing shrimp and cave shrimp; the species is sometimes kept in reef aquariums.

== Description ==
Stenopus pyrsonotus is a fairly large stenopodidean shrimp, varying in length from about 30 to 70 mm (1.2 to 2.8 in). It has a slender compressed body covered with short blunt spines. The chelae are long and narrow, the cutting edge having several blunt, peg-like teeth. The rostrum, eyestalk and carapace are pinkish-white, while the third maxillipeds, and the coxa, basis, ischia and mer joints of the pereiopods are translucent pink. The long antennules and the other appendages are white, and the abdomen is white apart from a broad longitudinal red stripe on the dorsal surface. The telson is white while the uropods are pink.

== Distribution and habitat ==
Stenopus pyrsonotus occurs in the tropical Indo-West Pacific region, where it has been found in the Hawaiian archipelago and Mauritius. It is a benthic, cryptic species, and is found in coral reef systems, typically in crevices, in caves and under overhangs. It occurs at depths down to about 130 m (430 ft).

== Ecology ==
Shrimps in this family are usually found in pairs and display elaborate courtship rituals. Several specimens of Stenopus pyrsonotus were found near a yellow-edged moray eel (Gymnothorax flavimarginatus), and it may be that this shrimp enters into a cleaning symbiosis with certain fish, as do several other members of its genus; this theory is supported by the showy white antennules and pincers, with which it may signal its availability.
