= Chonelasma oreia =

Scientific classification
- Kingdom: Animalia
- Phylum: Porifera
- Class: Hexactinellida
- Order: Sceptrulophora
- Family: Euretidae
- Genus: Chonelasma
- Species: C. oreia

Binomial name
- Chonelasma oreia Reiswig, 2014

Species of sponge

Chonelasma oreia is a species of sea sponge first found at the bottom of shelf, canyon and seamounts of the west coast of Washington, British Columbia and the Gulf of Alaska.
