= Coeloptychium bodei =

Coeloptychium bodei Temporal range: Late Cretaceous, 84.9–70.6 Ma

Scientific classification
- Kingdom: Animalia
- Phylum: Porifera
- Class: Hexactinellida
- Order: Lychniscosida
- Family: †Coeloptychidae
- Genus: †Coeloptychium
- Subgenus: †Myrmecioptychium; Schrammen, 1912
- Species: †C. bodei

Binomial name
- †Coeloptychium bodei Schrammen, 1912

Extinct sea sponge

Myrmecioptychium is an extinct lychniscosidan hexasterophoran sea sponge, which is a subgenus of Coeloptychium. Its remains have been found in Santonian-Maastrichtian-aged deposits in Broitzem, Germany and Poland. The type species, Coeloptychium bodei, was named in 1912.
