= Periphragella antarctica =

Scientific classification
- Kingdom: Animalia
- Phylum: Porifera
- Class: Hexactinellida
- Order: Sceptrulophora
- Family: Euretidae
- Genus: Periphragella
- Species: P. antarctica

Binomial name
- Periphragella antarctica Janussen, Tabachnick & Tendal, 2004

Species of sponge

Periphragella antarcticais a species of glass sponge found in the Weddell Sea.
