= Claviscopulia =

Scientific classification
- Kingdom: Animalia
- Phylum: Porifera
- Class: Hexactinellida
- Order: Sceptrulophora
- Family: Farreidae
- Genus: Claviscopulia; Schulze, 1899

Species
- Claviscopulia facunda Schmidt, 1870

Genus of sponges

Claviscopulia is a genus of glass sponge in the family Farreidae.

== Background ==
Claviscopulia is one of the genus in the family Farreidae under a class of glass sponges or Hexactinellida. Hexactinellida is one of four classes of the animal phylum Porifera.

Hexactinellida can exist in many different forms and shapes: sac, vase, blade, and branching. Hexactinellida is distinguished from the other three classes of sponge for its siliceous skeletal arrangements (spicules), triaxonic symmetry (six-rayed spicules or hexactins), and its huge soft tissue structures.

Glass sponges provide shelter and nutrients for many sea life. They make up a large amount of biomass because they are often found in large sizes.

They can live up to more than 100 years and are thought to be the oldest metazoans according to fossil records. However, despite being the oldest metazoans, glass sponges are the most understudied compared to other Porifera classes. The phylogenetic relationships between the genera are still being studied. What we know about glass sponges is that they break down into two subtaxa which are Hexasterophora and Amphidiscophora. The two subtaxa are separated by their skeletal characteristics: Hexaters and Amphidisc microscleres. Hexasterophora consists of 17 families under 5 orders while Amphidiscophora have 1 order and 3 families. There are about known 600 species within Hexactinellida, but it is thought to be even more diverse.

== Description ==
Claviscopulia is under Farreidae which is under the order Sceptrulophora. Sceptrulophora is characterized by its sceptrule spicules and dictyonal framework. Dictyonal Framework are mesh-like or net-like arrangements that are either irregular or polygonal that make up the entire body structures. In another word, the internal structure of Claviscopulia is made out of hexactins that are fused together. The dictyonal framework is a unique characteristic for genera in the Farreidae family.

Claviscopulia facunda has sceptrule head that is a brush-like shape. The genus has what we called farreoid dictyonal framework with clavules. Claviscopulia has a central cylindrical tube that has a diameter range from 8 to 10 mm and about 1 mm in thickness. The tube is then connected to the head which can branch out to more than 80 mm in diameter. Claviscopulia also have unicates and pentactins with spiny rays but no narrow-headed scopules. Its microscleres are also in the form of hexasters, hemi-heaxasters, and hexactins.

Claviscopulia used to be put into the family Euretidae until 1927 when a marine biologist, Isao Ijima realized that the sarules of Claviscopulia were made out of diactins, not monactins, so it could not be considered modified scopules.

Claviscopulia is thought to be homologous with a genus Sarostegia because they both possess sarules. Even though Sarostegia has a euretoid framework instead of farreoid framework, it is placed into the family Farreidae because of its similarity in possessing the sarules like Claviscopulia. However, Sarostegia has shorter sarules and pine-cone shaped sceptrule head unlike Claviscopulia's which is more brush-like shape.

== Diet ==
Glass sponges feed through filtering microscopic-size food from water. Glass sponges are distinct filter-feeders that thrive in thedeeper part of the ocean even though plankton concentrations are considerably low. They are supported by food sources that come as a result of strong current or the bacteria from sediments.

== Reproductive ==
Glass sponges are viviparous. They produce trichimella larvae. The development of trichimella start with cleavage, blastula, morphogenesis, and, lastly, larva. The cleavage is the first process of reproduction in metazoan where the multicellularity and ooplasmic segregation are created.

== Distribution ==
Glass sponges such as Claviscopulia are found worldwide in both hard and soft substrates and in the deeper part of the sea ranging from around 200m to more than 6000m. In some cases, glass sponges live in shallower areas like the submarine caves in Mediterranean or off the coast of British Columbia.
