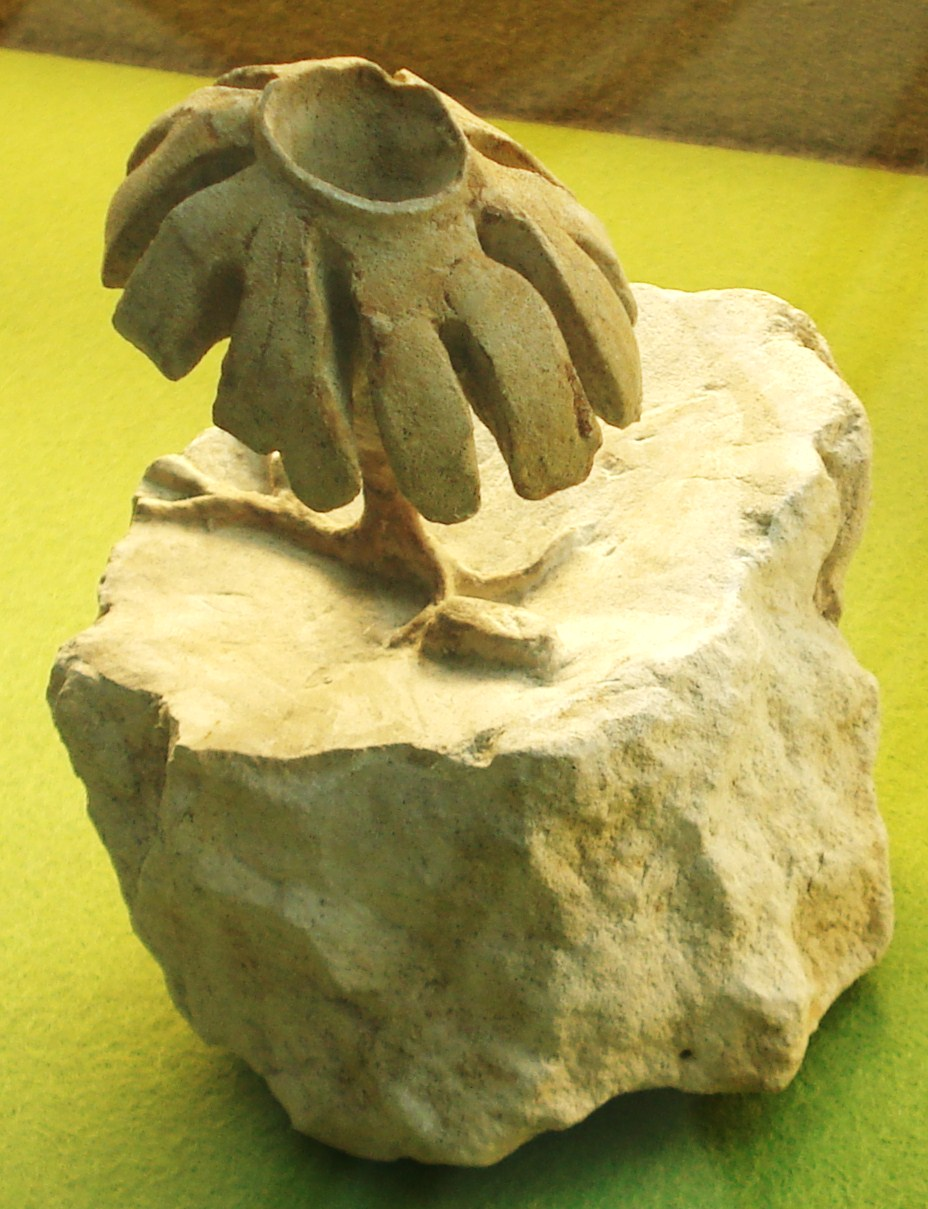
- Fossil of C. lobatum

Scientific classification
- Kingdom: Animalia
- Phylum: Porifera
- Class: Hexactinellida
- Order: Lychniscosida
- Family: †Coeloptychidae
- Genus: †Coeloptychium
- Subgenus: †Lophoptychium; Pomel, 1872
- Species: †C. lobatum

Binomial name
- †Coeloptychium lobatum Goldfuss, 1826

= Coeloptychium lobatum =

Coeloptychium lobatum Temporal range: Late Cretaceous, 84.9–70.6 Ma

Extinct sea sponge species

Lophoptychium is a subgenus of extinct lychniscosidan hexasterophoran sea sponge in the genus Coeloptychium. It is monotypic, being represented by the single species, Coeloptychium lobatum, the remains of which have been found in Santonian-Maastrichtian-aged deposits in Germany and Poland.
