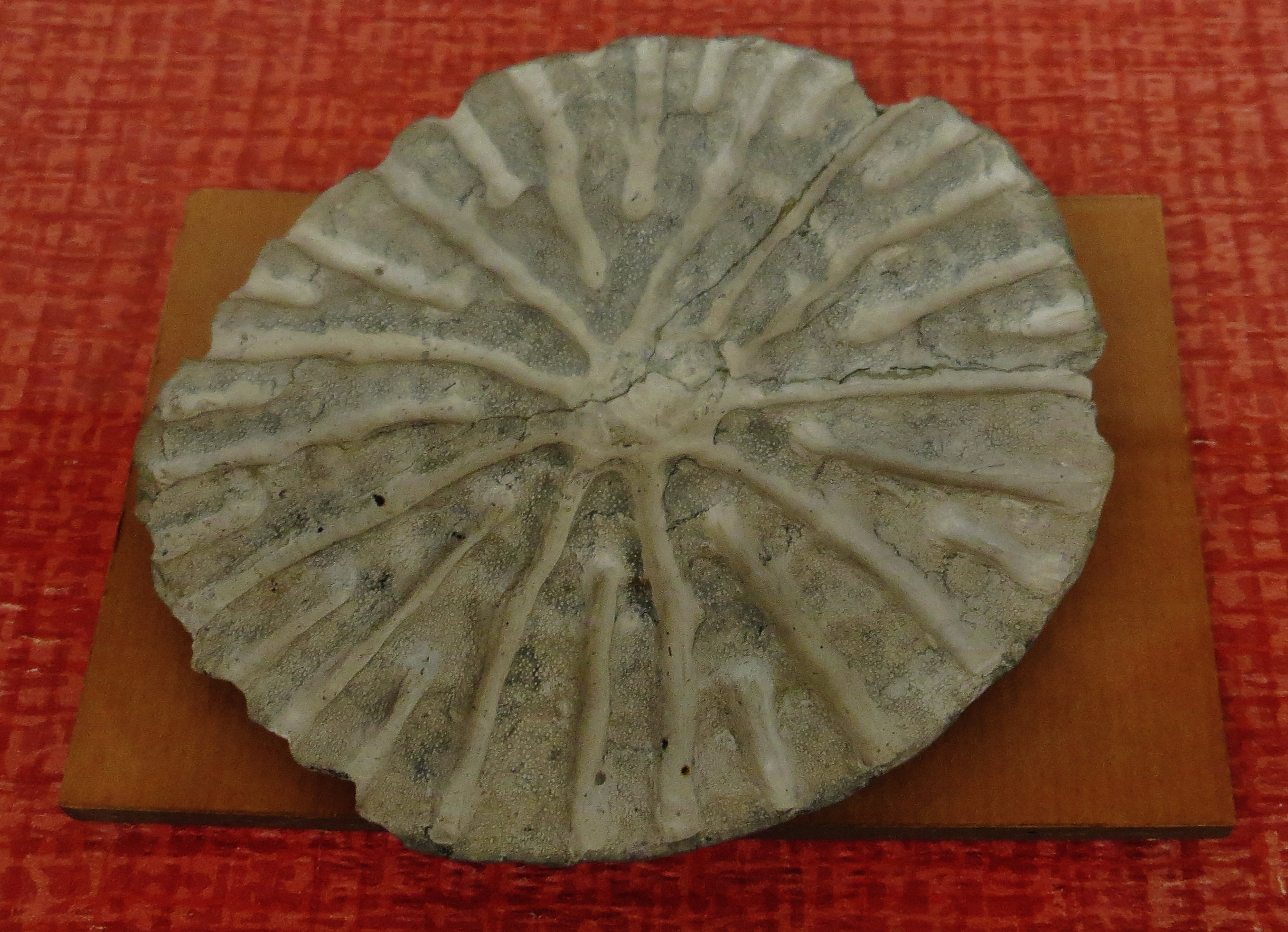
- Fossil of Coeloptychium agaricoides from the Campanian of Misburg, Lower Saxony

Scientific classification
- Kingdom: Animalia
- Phylum: Porifera
- Class: Hexactinellida
- Order: Lychniscosida
- Family: †Coeloptychidae
- Genus: †Coeloptychium; Goldfuss, 1826

Subgenera
- Lophoptychium Pomel, 1872; Myrmecioptychium Scrammer, 1912

= Coeloptychium =

Coeloptychium Temporal range: Cretaceous, 112–66 Ma

Extinct genus of sponges

Coeloptychium is an extinct genus of lychniscosidan hexasterophoran sea sponge which has often been used as an index fossil. Its remains have been found in Cretaceous sediments in Germany, Belgium, France and the UK. Coeloptyhcium is best preserved in Campanian sediments in Germany. The type species, C. agaricoides, was named in 1826.

== Species ==
- Coeloptychium agaricoides Goldfuss, 1826
- Coeloptychium bodei Schrammen 1912
- Coeloptychium deciminum Roemer, 1841
- Coeloptychium incisum Roemer, 1841
- Coeloptychium lobatum Goldfuss, 1826
- Coeloptychium princeps Roemer, 1861
- Coeloptychium rude Zittel, 1876
- Coeloptychium seebachi Zittel, 1876
- Coeloptychium subagaricoides Sinov, 1871
- Coeloptychium sulciferum Roemer, 1841
