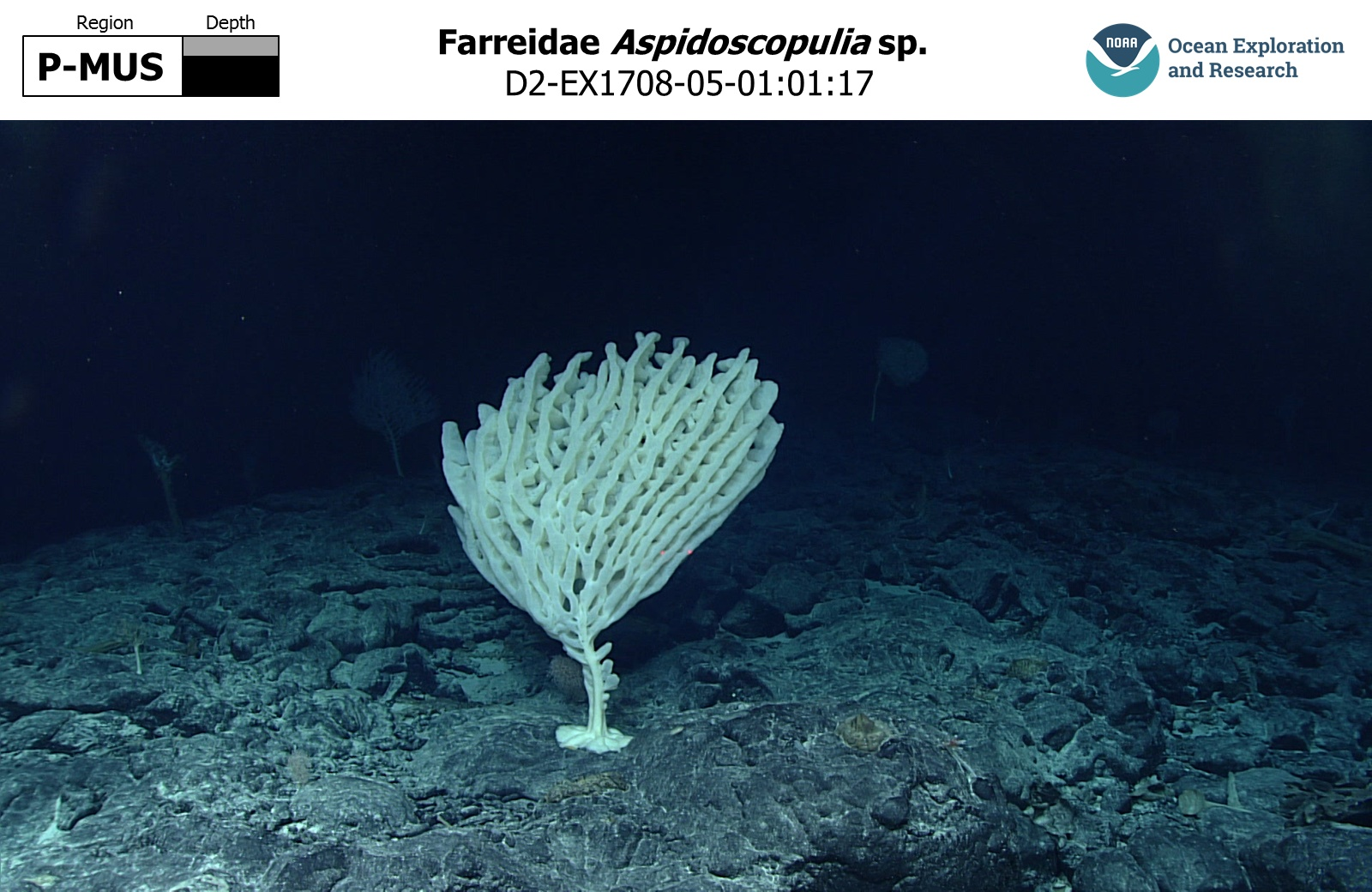

Scientific classification
- Kingdom: Animalia
- Phylum: Porifera
- Class: Hexactinellida
- Order: Sceptrulophora
- Family: Farreidae
- Genus: Aspidoscopulia; Reiswig, 2002

Species
- Aspidoscopulia australia Dohrmann, Göcke & Janussen, 2011; Aspidoscopulia bisymmetrica Tabachnick, Menshenina, Pisera & Ehrlich, 2011; Aspidoscopulia furcillata Lévi, 1990; Aspidoscopulia ospreya Dohrmann, Göcke & Janussen, 2011; Aspidoscopulia tetrasymmetrica Tabachnick, Menshenina, Pisera & Ehrlich, 2011

= Aspidoscopulia =

Genus of sponges

Aspidoscopulia is a genus of glass sponge in the family Farreidae.
