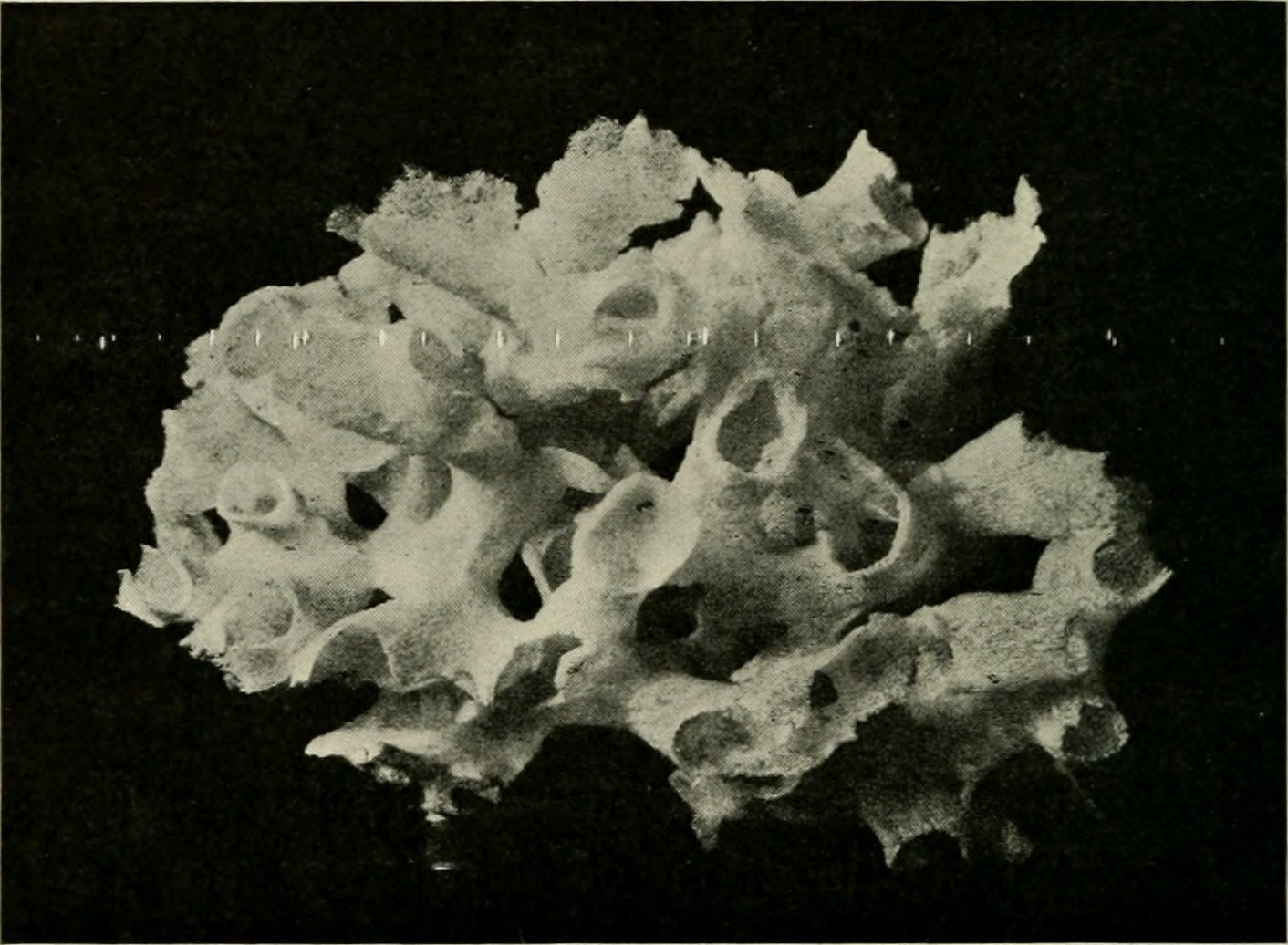
- Farrea occa

Scientific classification
- Kingdom: Animalia
- Phylum: Porifera
- Class: Hexactinellida
- Order: Sceptrulophora
- Family: Farreidae
- Genus: Farrea; Bowerbank, 1862

= Farrea =

Genus of sponges

Farrea is a genus of glass sponges in the family Farreidae.

== Species ==
Species accepted by the World Register of Marine Species:

- Farrea aleutiana Reiswig & Stone, 2013
- Farrea ananchorata Reiswig & Kelly, 2011
- Farrea anoxyhexastera Reiswig & Kelly, 2011
- Farrea aspondyla Reiswig & Stone, 2013
- Farrea balaguerii de Linares, 1887
- Farrea beringiana Okada, 1932
- Farrea bowerbanki Boury-Esnault, Vacelet & Chevaldonné, 2017
- Farrea campossinus Lopes, Hajdu & Reiswig, 2011
- Farrea convolvulus Schulze, 1899
- Farrea cordelli Reiswig, 2020
- Farrea densa Carter, 1873
- Farrea foliascens Topsent, 1906
- Farrea hanitschi Ijima, 1927
- Farrea herdendorfi Duplessis & Reiswig, 2004
- Farrea hieroglyphica Tabachnick & Fromont, 2019
- Farrea kurilensis Okada, 1932
- Farrea laminaris Topsent, 1904
- Farrea lendenfeldi Ijima, 1927
- Farrea medusiforma Reiswig & Kelly, 2011
- Farrea mexicana Wilson, 1904
- Farrea microclavula Tabachnick, 1988
- Farrea nodulosa Ijima, 1927
- Farrea occa Bowerbank, 1862
- Farrea omniclavata Reiswig, 2014
- Farrea onychohexastera Reiswig & Kelly, 2011
- Farrea raoulensis Reiswig & Kelly, 2011
- Farrea ritchieae Tabachnick & Fromont, 2019
- Farrea schulzei Reiswig, 2018
- Farrea seiri Duplessis & Reiswig, 2004
- Farrea similaris Reiswig & Kelly, 2011
- Farrea sollasii Schulze, 1886
- Farrea spirifera Ijima, 1927
- Farrea truncata Reiswig, 2014
- Farrea vosmaeri Schulze, 1886
- Farrea watasei Okada, 1932
- Farrea weltneri Topsent, 1901
- Farrea woodwardi (Kent, 1870)
