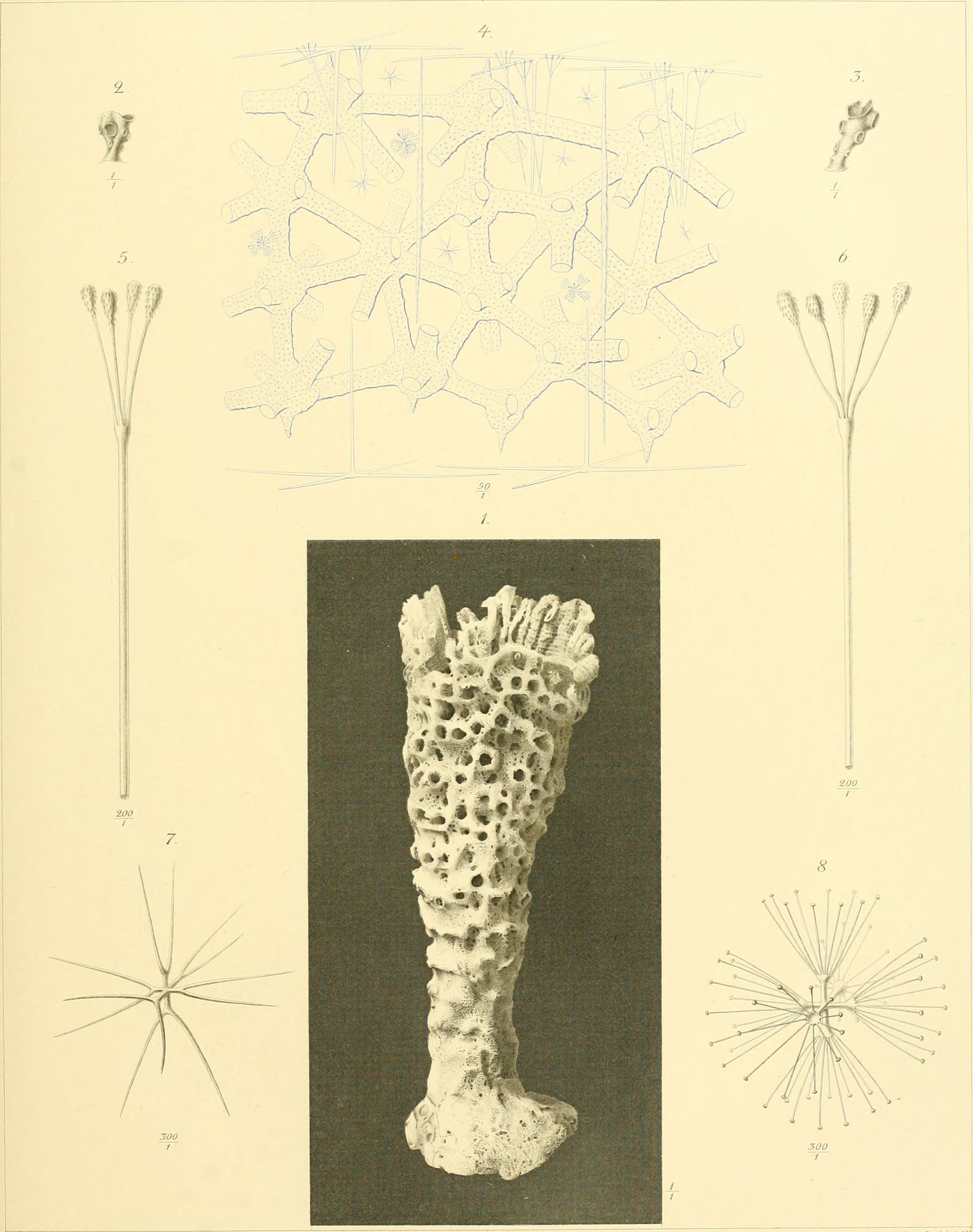
- Lefroyella decora. Plate LXXXII from Report on the scientific results of the voyage of H.M.S. Challenger during the years 1873-76

Scientific classification
- Kingdom: Animalia
- Phylum: Porifera
- Class: Hexactinellida
- Order: Sceptrulophora
- Family: Euretidae
- Subfamily: Euretinae; Zittel, 1877

Genera
- Calyptorete Okada, 1925; Conorete Ijima, 1927; Endorete Topsent, 1928; Eurete Semper, 1868; Gymnorete Ijima, 1927; Lefroyella Thomson, 1877; Pararete Ijima, 1927; Pityrete Topsent, 1928

= Euretinae =

Subfamily of hexactinellid sponges

Euretinae is a subfamily of glass sponges in the family Euretidae.
