= Chonelasmatinae =

Scientific classification
- Domain: Eukaryota
- Kingdom: Animalia
- Phylum: Porifera
- Class: Hexactinellida
- Order: Sceptrulophora
- Family: Euretidae
- Subfamily: Chonelasmatinae; Schrammen, 1912

Subfamily of sponges

Chonelasmatinae is a subfamily of sea sponge in the family Euretidae.

== Species ==
According to the World Register of Marine Species, the following species are accepted within Chonelasmatinae:

- Bathyxiphus Schulze, 1899
- Chonelasma Schulze, 1886
- Periphragella Marshall, 1875
- Pinulasma Reiswig & Stone, 2013
- Pleurochorium Schrammen, 1912
- Tretochone Reid, 1958
- Verrucocoeloidea Reid, 1969
