= Macromaxillocaris =

Scientific classification
- Kingdom: Animalia
- Phylum: Arthropoda
- Clade: Pancrustacea
- Class: Malacostraca
- Order: Decapoda
- Suborder: Pleocyemata
- Infraorder: Stenopodidea
- Family: Macromaxillocarididae; Alvarez, Iliffe & Villalobos, 2006
- Genus: Macromaxillocaris; Alvarez, Iliffe & Villalobos, 2006
- Species: M. bahamaensis

Binomial name
- Macromaxillocaris bahamaensis Alvarez, Iliffe & Villalobos, 2006

Genus of crustaceans

Macromaxillocaris bahamaensis is a species of stenopodidean shrimp, the only species in the family Macromaxillocarididae. It is a troglobite, known only from an anchialine pool in a cave in the Bahamas. It differs from other stenopodideans by the enlargement of its third maxilliped.

== Description ==
The holotype of M. bahamaensis has a total length (TL) of 14.4 millimetres (0.57 in) (carapace length, CL, 4.5 mm or 0.18 in); the paratype is smaller at TL 9.7 mm (0.38 in), CL 3.0 mm (0.12 in). In common with other troglobitic species, the body lacks pigments, and the eyes are vestigial. Like other stenopodideans, Macromaxillocaris has chelae (claws) on the first three pairs of pereiopods (walking legs); it differs from them by the size of the third maxilliped, which is greatly enlarged in Macromaxillocaris, and is the strongest of all the animal's appendages.

== Distribution and habitat ==
Macromaxillocaris bahamaensis is the first species discovered among the Stenopodidea to be adapted to a troglobitic lifestyle. It was found in an anchialine pool in Oven Rock Cave on Great Guana Cay, a short distance west of Exuma Cays in the Bahamas. Oven Rock Cave was first explored in 1993 and contains at least 20 species of stygobiont, and is thus a hotspot of subterranean biodiversity. The entrance to the cave is on a hillside, and leads to a small lake, 1.5 m (4 ft 11 in) deep, but which is connected to an underwater room, which is in turn connected to other passages; over 300 m (980 ft) has been explored. The water in the lake has a salinity of 28.3 ppt at the surface, but increases with increasing depth to around 33–35 ppt at a depth of 12 m (39 ft). Macromaxillocaris is thought to live on the ceiling of the caves, or in fissures in the bedrock, since it was only observed by divers as they returned to the surface, presumably having been dislodged by the divers' exhaust bubbles.

== Taxonomy ==
Macromaxillocaris bahamaensis was described in 2006 by Fernando Alvarez, Thomas M. Iliffe and José Luis Villalobos, in an article in the Journal of Crustacean Biology. As well as a new species and genus, the authors erected a new family, placed in the infraorder Stenopodidea. This was the first major addition to the taxonomy of the infraorder for some time, the previous new family being Spongicolidae, created by Frederick Schram in 1986. The name Macromaxillocaris derives from the Greek root macros (meaning "long"), the Latin maxillaris (meaning "jaw"), and the Greek karis (meaning "shrimp"); it refers to the exceptional length of the third maxilliped of Macromaxillocaris. The specific epithet bahamaensis refers to the Bahamas, where the species was found.
