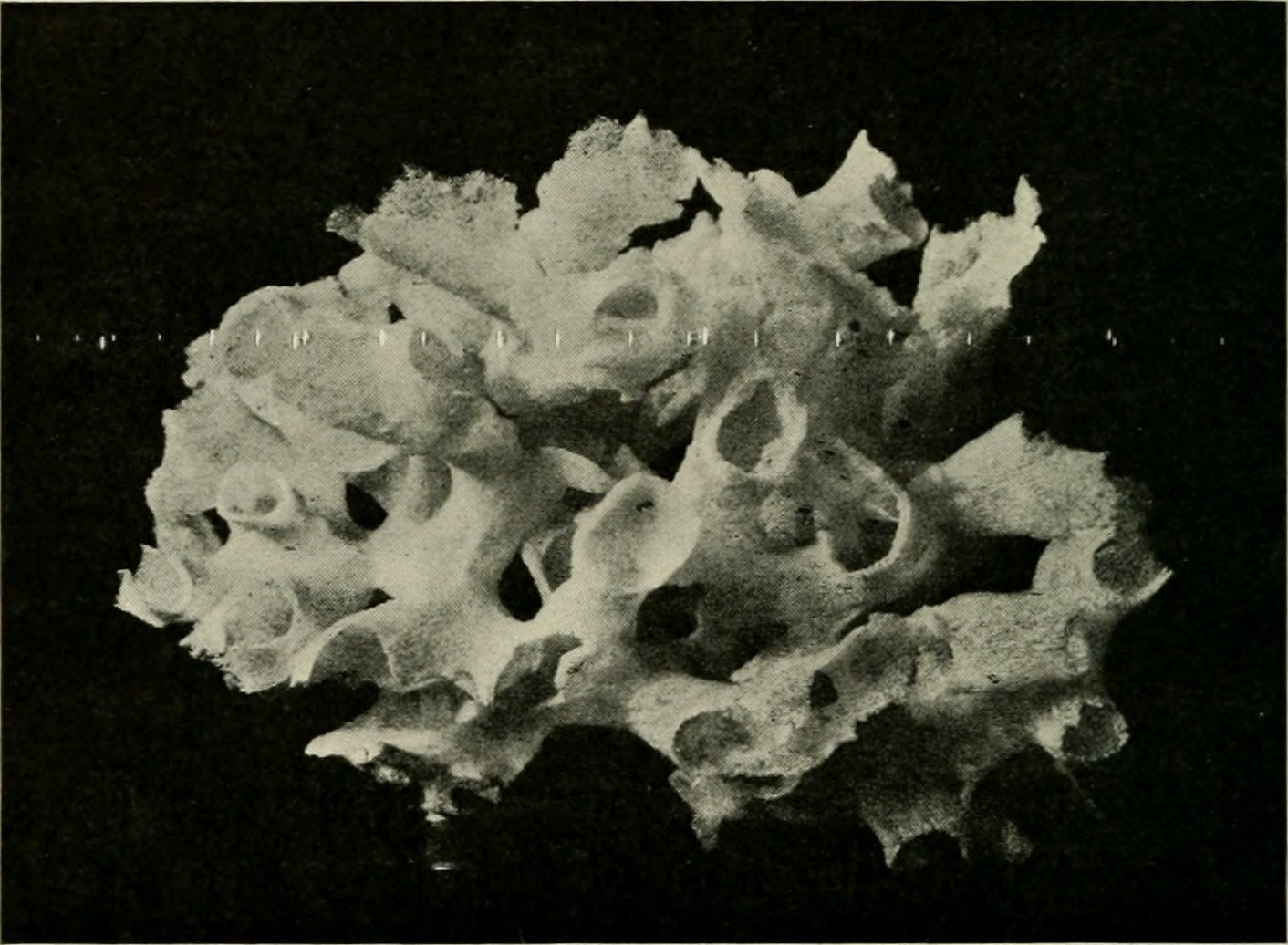

Scientific classification
- Kingdom: Animalia
- Phylum: Porifera
- Class: Hexactinellida
- Order: Sceptrulophora
- Family: Farreidae
- Genus: Farrea
- Species: F. occa

Binomial name
- Farrea occa Bowerbank, 1862

= Farrea occa =

Farrea occa Temporal range: 66.043–0 Ma

Species of sponge

Farrea occa sometimes referred to as the reversed glass sponge, is a species of glass sponge in the family Farreidae.

Like other members of the class Hexactinellida, Farrea occa has six-rayed silica spicules that form a sturdy internal skeleton. It is an exclusively marine species with a cosmopolitan distribution, typically inhabiting deep waters at depths of 86 to 3,018 metres. Farrea occa thrives in cold waters and acts as a foundational reef-building species in deep-sea ecosystems. Specimens of the subspecies Farrea occa occa form branching tubes measuring 4 to 12 mm in diameter, with wall thicknesses of 0.5 to 1 mm and a central lumen 3 to 10 mm wide.

Farrea occa typically grows by first forming a primary stem, with numerous smaller branches diverging from the parent stalk. Each subsequent offshoot becomes progressively shorter and thinner, resulting in a fan-shaped colony.
