= Lonchiphora =

Scientific classification
- Kingdom: Animalia
- Phylum: Porifera
- Class: Hexactinellida
- Order: Sceptrulophora
- Family: Farreidae
- Genus: Lonchiphora; Ijima, 1927

Species
- Lonchiphora antarctica Göcke & Janussen, 2011; Lonchiphora inversaIjima, 1927

Genus of sponges

Lonchiphora is a genus of glass sponge in the family Farreidae.
