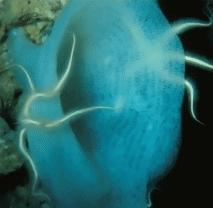
- Lefroyella decora

Scientific classification
- Kingdom: Animalia
- Phylum: Porifera
- Class: Hexactinellida
- Order: Sceptrulophora
- Family: Euretidae
- Subfamily: Euretinae
- Genus: Lefroyella; Thomson, 1877

= Lefroyella =

Genus of glass sponges

Lefroyella is a genus of glass sponges in the subfamily Euretinae, containing 2 species.

== Species ==
- Lefroyella ceramensis Ijima, 1927
- Lefroyella decora Thomson, 1877
