= Aulocystidae =

Scientific classification
- Kingdom: Animalia
- Phylum: Porifera
- Class: Hexactinellida
- Order: Lychniscosida
- Family: Aulocystidae

Family of sponges

Aulocystidae is a family of sponges belonging to the order Lychniscosida.

Genera:

- †Adaverina Klaamann, 1969
- †Adetopora Sokolov, 1955
- †Aulostegites Lejeune & Pel, 1973
- †Cystitrypanopora Jia, 1977
- Lychnocystis Reiswig, 2002
- Neoaulocystis Zhuravleva, 1962
- †Pachyphragma Watkins, 1959
- †Plexituba Stainbrook, 1946
- †Pseudoromingeria Yabe & Sugiyama, 1941
