= Jilinicaris =

Jilinicaris Temporal range: Santonian

Scientific classification
- Kingdom: Animalia
- Phylum: Arthropoda
- Clade: Pancrustacea
- Class: Malacostraca
- Order: Decapoda
- Suborder: Pleocyemata
- Family: Spongicolidae
- Genus: Jilinicaris
- Species: J. chinensis

Binomial name
- Jilinicaris chinensis Schram, Shen, Vonk & Taylor, 2000

Extinct genus of crustaceans

Jilinicaris is an extinct genus of crustacean in the order Decapoda, and is the second oldest Stenopodidean fossil, having been found in rocks of Late Cretaceous age. It was considered to be the earliest fossil assigned to the Stenopodidea, until the discovery of Devonostenopus pennsylvaniensis in 2014. Jilinicaris is named after Jilin Province, where it was discovered. The holotype was found with three fossils of Estherites bifurcatus in a light gray muddy siltstone belonging to the lacustrine Nenjiang Formation.
