= Diapleuridae =

Scientific classification
- Kingdom: Animalia
- Phylum: Porifera
- Class: Hexactinellida
- Order: Lychniscosida
- Family: Diapleuridae

Family of sponges

Diapleuridae is a family of glass sponges (class Hexactinellida) in the order Lychniscosida. The only living species, Scleroplegma lanterna, is endemic to the waters around Cuba and St. Croix in the Caribbean Sea.

== Species ==
- †Coronispongia confossa? [Eocene]
- Scleroplegma lanterna
  - (Synonym: Diapleura maasi)

== History ==
The first specimens of the family Diapleuridae known to science were collected in the 1870s. Oscar Schmidt, working in the Caribbean Sea, coined the type species Scleroplegma lanterna in 1879. The sponge was initially named Auloplegma lanterna, until it was determined that the genus name Auloplegma was preoccupied by another sponge named in 1870. During his study, he noted the rough texture of the fossils as well as the conical shape of the species. In 1880, Schmidt named two more species (Scleroplegma seriatum and Scleroplegma herculeum), though these species are probably not referable to the same genus or order.

An independent expedition was carried out by Dr. Isao Ijimi in the 1920s, during his cruise of the Caribbean Sea. This expedition culminated in his book The Hexactinellida of the Siboga Expedition, which was published in 1927. In this book, he named and illustrated the new sponge species Diapleura maasi. It was later determined that Diapleura maasi and Scleroplegma lanterna were the same sponge. Since Scleroplegma lanterna had priority, that species name stuck. Nevertheless, Ijimi's family Diapleuridae had no predecessor, so it was also retained as a valid name.

== Ecology ==
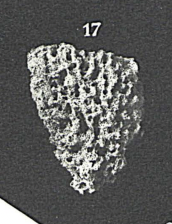
A photo of "Diapleura maasi" (Scleroplegma lanterna) taken by Dr. Ijima (1927)

Scleroplegma is a benthic organism, living on the seafloor between about 204 and 585 meters in depth. The individual sponge is roughly 30mm in height and 25mm in width, with a "glassy" silica skeleton. Like all sponges, diapleurids are suspension feeders, primarily feeding on plankton and other suspended materials.

Scleroplegma has “ridge-like tracts” of the skeleton running vertically about the fossil. The sponge has a smooth gastral cavity that varies in thickness. The skeleton consists of a “gastral-skeletal” with branching ridges surrounding it. The branches form a net-like structure of funnel-like calyxes. The excurrent and incurrent parts of the sponge are thought to be formed through the same tubule–unlike other species within the genus where both tubules are distinctly separate–and are thought to be the cause of the gaps within the tube wall of the sponge.

Coronispongia confossa, a fossil species indigenous to Italy, was named by Vivianna Frisone and her team in 2016. It would have inhabiting the middle and outer edges of shallow-water carbonate ramps with heterogeneous substrates.
