= Fieldingiidae =

Scientific classification
- Kingdom: Animalia
- Phylum: Porifera
- Class: Hexactinellida
- Order: Sceptrulophora
- Family: Fieldingiidae

Family of sponges

Fieldingiidae is a family of sponges belonging to the order Sceptrulophora.

Genera:

- Fieldingia Kent, 1870
