= Auloplacidae =

Scientific classification
- Domain: Eukaryota
- Kingdom: Animalia
- Phylum: Porifera
- Class: Hexactinellida
- Order: Sceptrulophora
- Family: Auloplacidae

Family of sponges

Auloplacidae is a family of sponges belonging to the order Sceptrulophora.

Genera:

- Auloplax Schulze, 1904
- Dictyoplax Reiswig & Dohrmann, 2014
