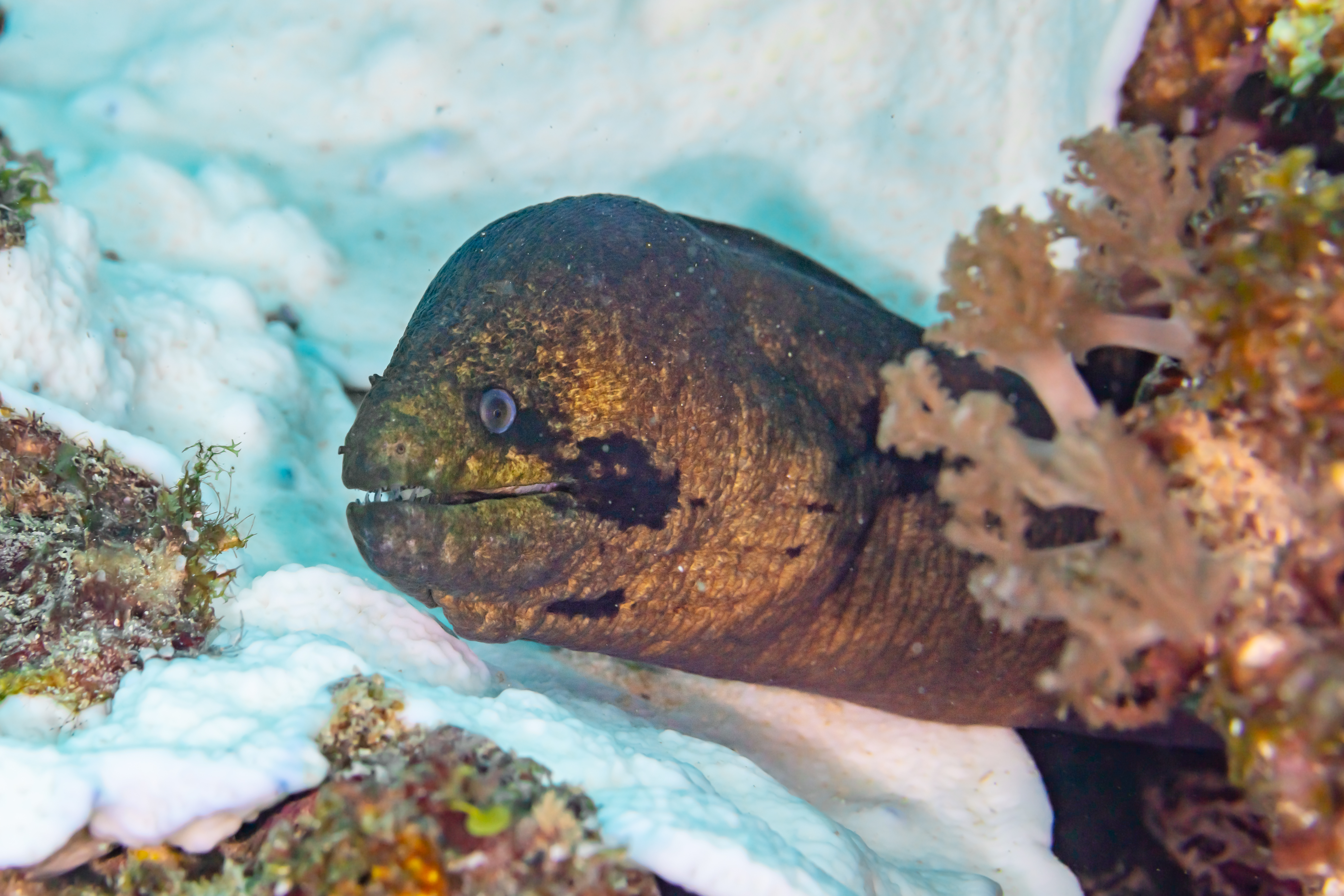

Conservation status
- Least Concern (IUCN 3.1)

Scientific classification
- Kingdom: Animalia
- Phylum: Chordata
- Class: Actinopterygii
- Order: Anguilliformes
- Family: Muraenidae
- Genus: Gymnothorax
- Species: G. flavimarginatus

Binomial name
- Gymnothorax flavimarginatus (Rüppell, 1830)

Synonyms
- Muraena flavimarginata Rüppell, 1830; Lycodontis flavimarginatus (Rüppell, 1830); Gymnothorax thalassopterus Jenkins, 1903; Gymnothorax viridipinnis Bliss, 1883; Lycodontis lemayi Smith, 1949; Muraena batuensis Bleeker, 1856–57; Muraena mauritiana Kaup, 1856; Muraena viridipinna Seale, 1917

= Yellow-edged moray =

Species of fish

The yellow-edged moray, also known as yellow-margin(ed) moray, leopard moray, and speckled moray, (Gymnothorax flavimarginatus) is a moray eel of the family Muraenidae, found in the Indo-Pacific Oceans at depths to 150 m (500 ft).

== Description ==
Moray eels are long slender fish with bulbous heads, rounded snouts and gradually tapering tails. The large mouth contains a single row of small pointed teeth in the lower jaw and several vomerine teeth on the roof of the mouth. The dorsal fin extends continuously from just behind the head along the back to round the tail, where it continues as the caudal and anal fins. The yellow-edged moray can grow to a maximum length of about 240 cm (90 in), but a more typical length would be 80 cm (30 in). It is basically a dull yellow colour with a mottled pattern of dark brown or black covering most of the surface. The head is a purplish-grey and there is a large black blotch at the operculum. The margins of the fins on the posterior part of the body are yellowish or greenish. Young fish may have a brighter yellow background colour with brown blotches.

== Distribution and habitat ==
The yellow-edged moray occurs in the tropical Indo-Pacific region. Its range extends from East Africa and the Red Sea to Japan, Indonesia and Australia, and on to the Ryukyu and Hawaiian islands, New Caledonia and on to Costa Rica, Panama and the Galápagos Islands. Its typical habitat is coral or rocky areas of reef flats and the protected sides of seaward reefs, ranging down to a depth of about 150 m (500 ft).

== Ecology ==
The yellow-edged moray is usually a solitary fish, tending to hide in a crevice or submerged in the sediment with just its head protruding. Sometimes it shares its shelter with conspecifics or with other moray eel species. It is mainly nocturnal, but also swims around freely in the morning and evening. Fish, cephalopods and crustaceans are included in its diet. If a fish is speared on the reef, these moray eels are quick to appear, being sensitive to stimuli emitted by injured or stressed fish. This moray eel was recently identified as a natural predator of the lionfish Pterois miles in its native habitat in the Red Sea. The shrimp-like crustacean Stenopus pyrsonotus, has often been found in close proximity with a yellow-edged moray eel, leading to the possibility that the shrimp may enter into a cleaning symbiosis with the eel.

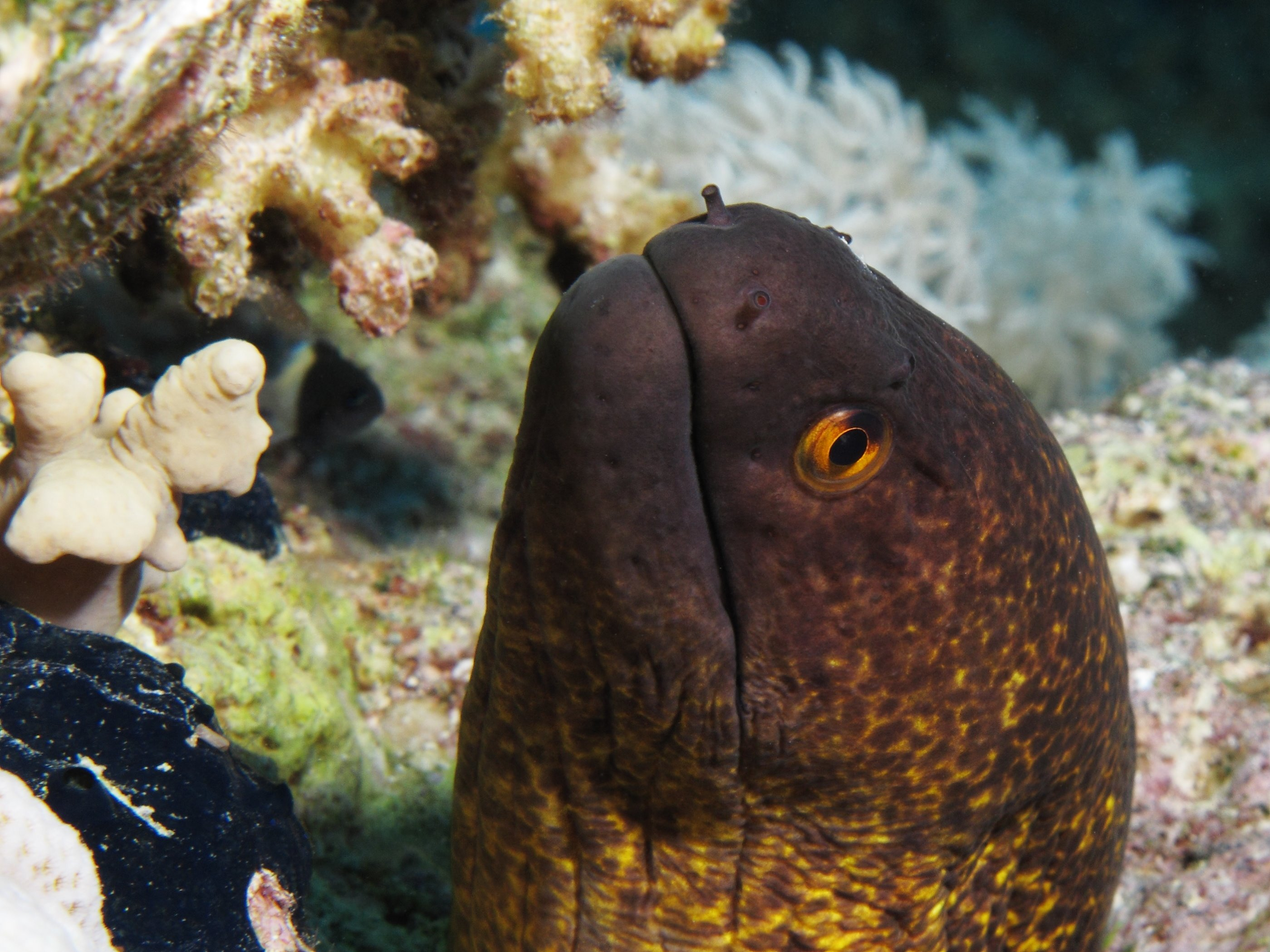
Yellow-edged moray near Sharm el-Sheikh, Egypt

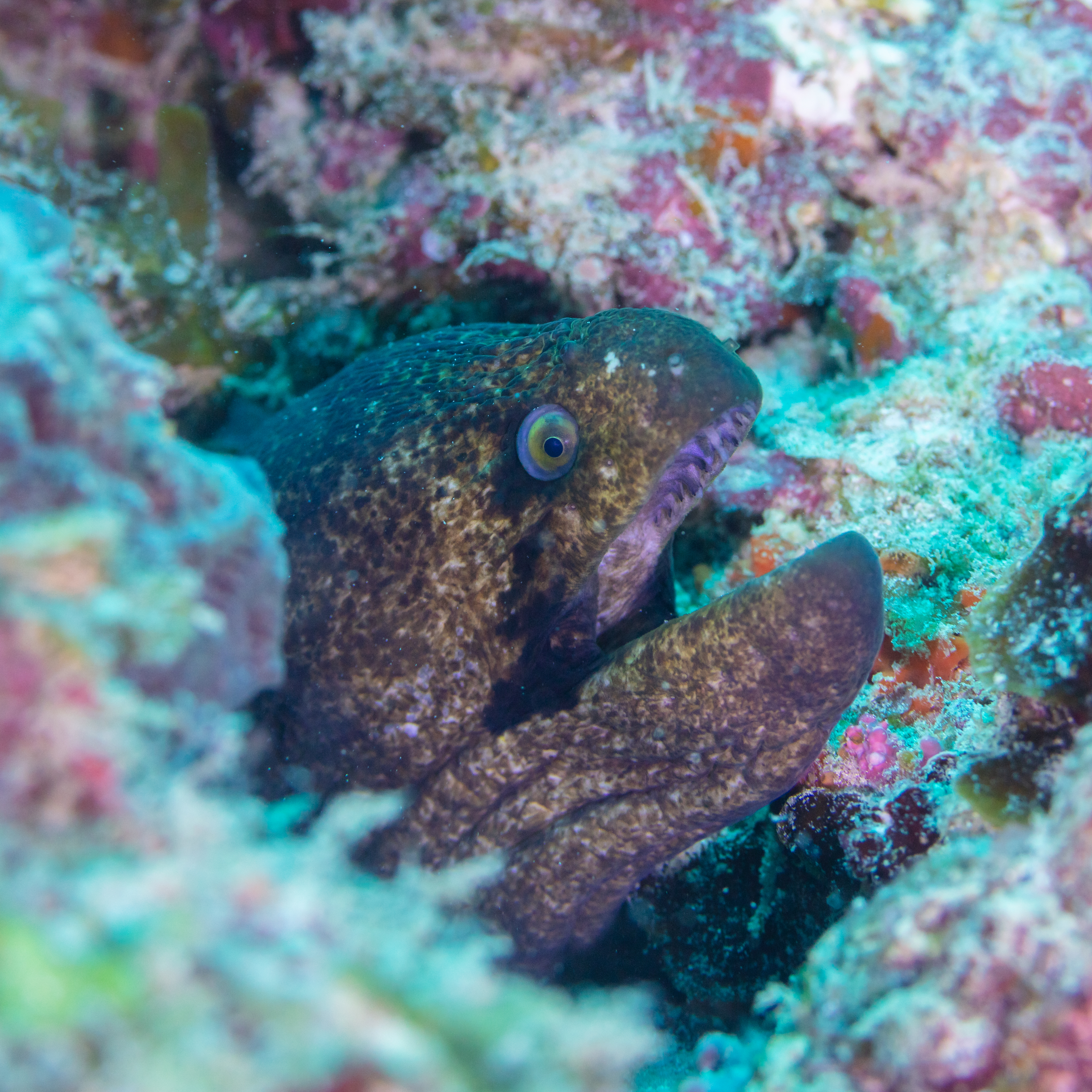
Yellow-edged moray in Zanzibar, Tanzania

Yellow-edged moray eel at Kealakekua Bay on the Big Island of Hawaii
