= Craticulariidae =

Scientific classification
- Domain: Eukaryota
- Kingdom: Animalia
- Phylum: Porifera
- Class: Hexactinellida
- Order: Sceptrulophora
- Family: Craticulariidae

Synonyms
- Craticularidae

Family of sponges

Craticulariidae is a family of sponges belonging to the order Sceptrulophora.

== Genera ==
Genera:

- Botroclonium Pobcta, 1883
- Conicospongia Rigby & Pisera, 2001
- Cordiospongia Rigby & Pisera, 2001
- Craticularia Zittel, 1878
- Dictyonocoelia Étallon, 1859
- Dracolychnos Wu & Xiao, 1989
- Ecblastesia Rauff, 1933
- Esfahanella Senowbari-Daryan & Amirhassankhani, 2012
- Intextum Laubenfels, 1955
- Laocoetis Pomel, 1872
- Leptolacis Schrammen, 1936
- Pachyascus Schrammen, 1936
- Paleocraticularia Rigby & Pisera, 2001
- Periplectum Rauff, 1933
- Pleuroguettardia Reid, 1962
- Polonospongia Rigby & Pisera, 2001
- Ptychocoetis Pomel, 1872
- Ptychodesia Schrammen, 1912
- Pycnocalyptra Schrammen, 1936
- Reticraticularia Lagneau-Hérenger, 1962
- Scipiospongia Rigby, Xichun & Jiasong, 1998
- Sphenaulax Zittel, 1878
- Strephinia Hinde, 1883
- Thyroidium de Laubenfels, 1955
- Turbiplana Pervushov, 2008
- Urnospongia Rigby & Pisera, 2001
