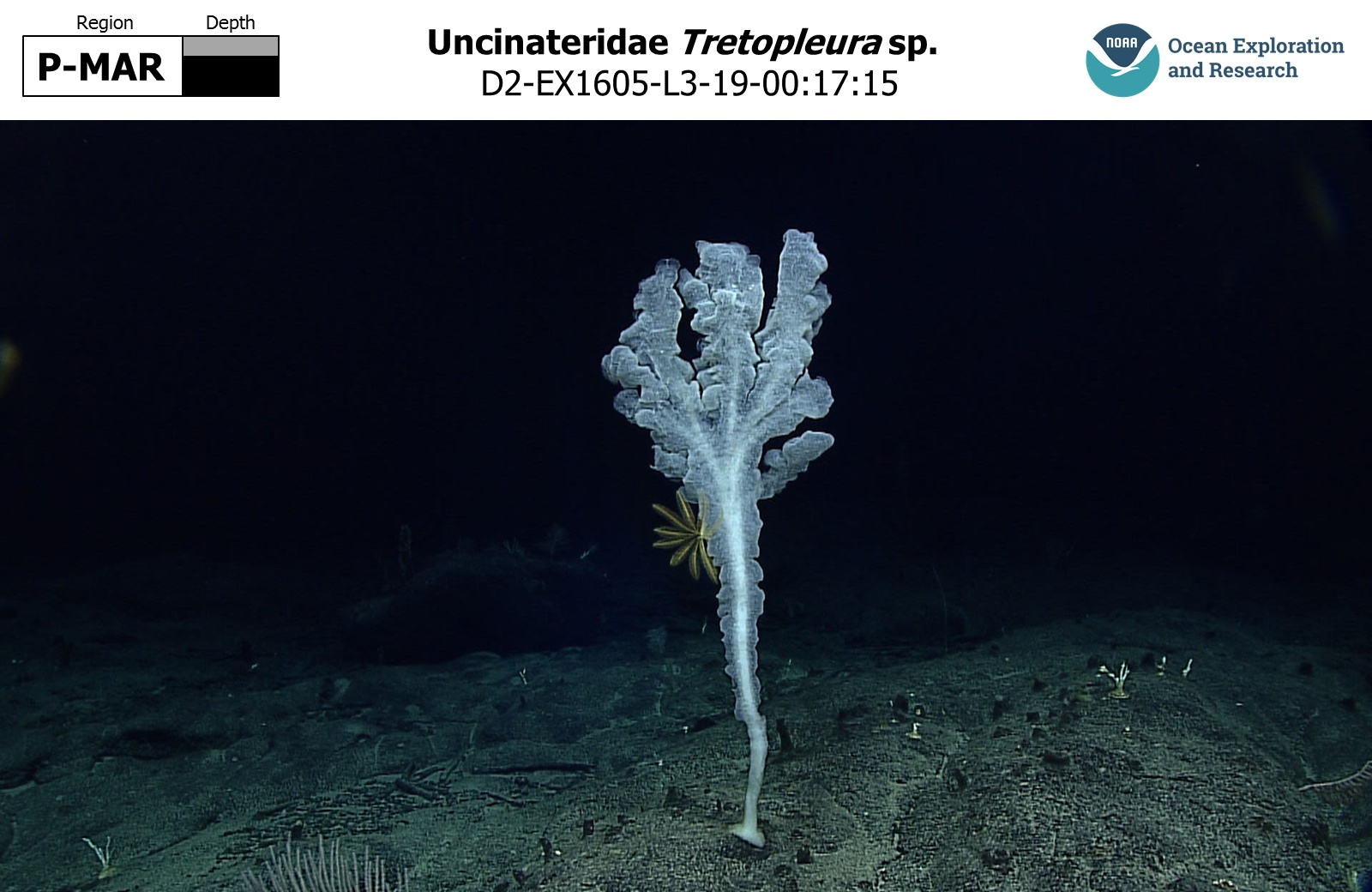

Scientific classification
- Kingdom: Animalia
- Phylum: Porifera
- Class: Hexactinellida
- Order: Sceptrulophora
- Family: Uncinateridae; Reiswig, 2002

Genera
- TretopleuraIjima, 1927; UncinateraTopsent, 1901

= Uncinateridae =

Order of hexactinellid sponges

Uncinateridae is a family of glass sponges in the order Sceptrulophora.
