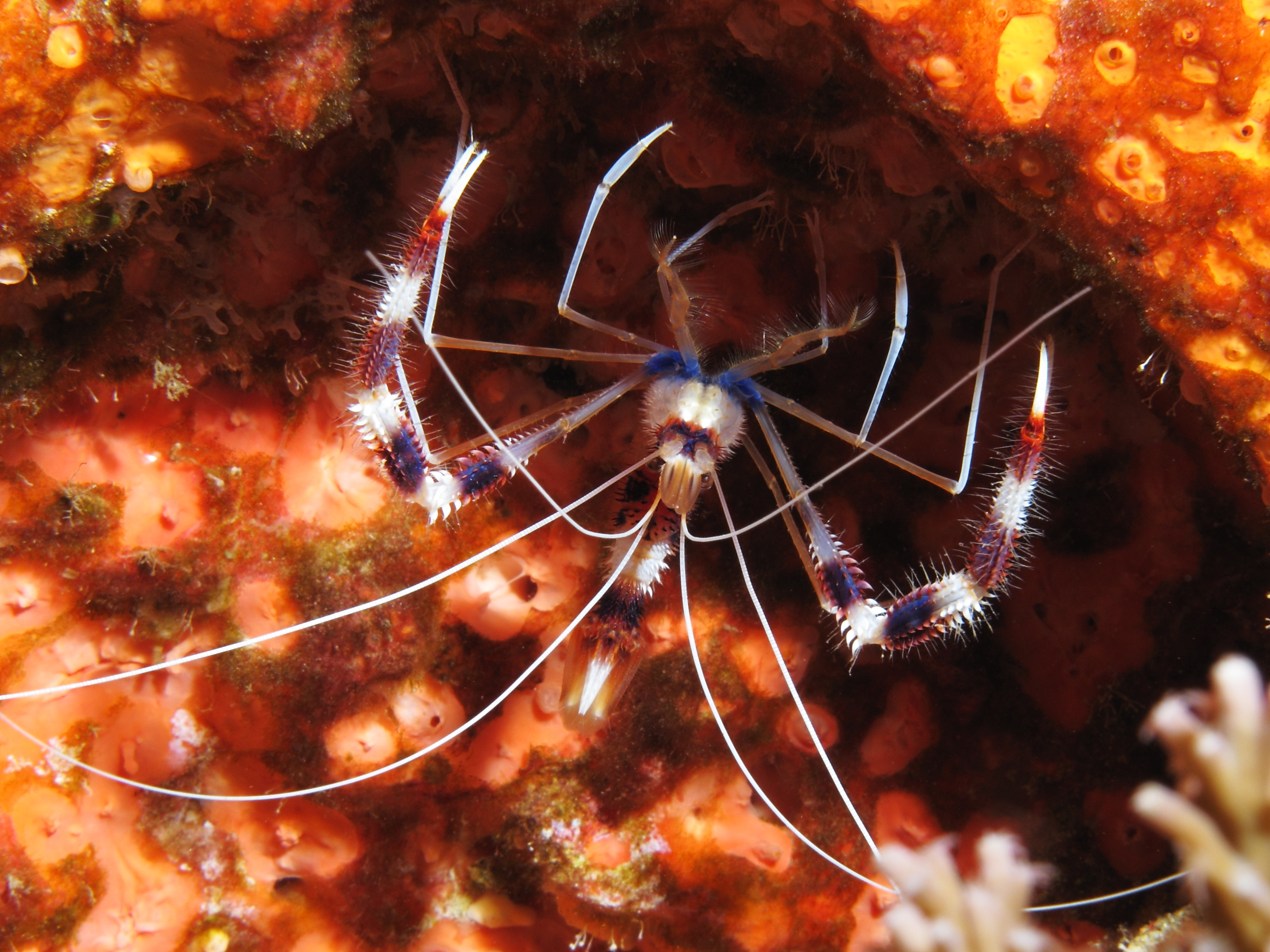
- S. hispidus from Batu Moncho, Indonesia

Scientific classification
- Kingdom: Animalia
- Phylum: Arthropoda
- Clade: Pancrustacea
- Class: Malacostraca
- Order: Decapoda
- Suborder: Pleocyemata
- Family: Stenopodidae
- Genus: Stenopus
- Species: S. hispidus

Binomial name
- Stenopus hispidus (Olivier, 1811)

= Stenopus hispidus =

Species of crustacean

Stenopus hispidus is a shrimp-like decapod crustacean belonging to the infraorder Stenopodidea. Common names include coral banded shrimp, banded boxer shrimp, and banded cleaner shrimp.

== Distribution ==
Stenopus hispidus has a pan-tropical distribution, extending into some temperate areas. It is found in the Atlantic, Indian, and Pacific Oceans. Its Atlantic habitat includes Canada, West Africa, Brazil, and the Gulf of Mexico. In the Indian Ocean, It is found near Madagascar, India, Sri Lanka, and Southeast Asia. Its Pacific habitat ranges from Eastern China down to Australia, where it is found as far south as Sydney and New Zealand.

== Description ==
Stenopus hispidus reaches a total length of 60 millimetres (2.4 in), and has striking colouration. The ground colour is transparent, but the carapace, abdomen and the large third pereiopod are all banded red and white. The antennae and other pereiopods are white. The abdomen, carapace and third pereiopods are covered in spines.

Stenopus hispidus has the ability to detect individuals of its species. This trait is uncommon in invertebrates and is most likely explained through chemical signals.

== Ecology ==
Stenopus hispidus lives below the intertidal zone, at depth of up to 210 metres (690 ft), on coral reefs. It is a cleaner shrimp, and advertises to passing fish by slowly waving its long, white antennae. To achieve this, S. hispidus performs a dancing behavior, staying close to its home in the reef and whips out its antenna as they move side to side. This behavior was first observed in a lab, the dancing behavior observed in cleaner shrimp acts as a signal to inform surrounding fish that they are ready to feed and clean. S. hispidus uses its three pairs of claws to remove parasites, fungi and damaged tissue from the fish. Stenopus hispidus is monogamous. S. hispidus females are typically larger than the males. They occupy a territory that is 1–2 meters in diameter.

== Images ==
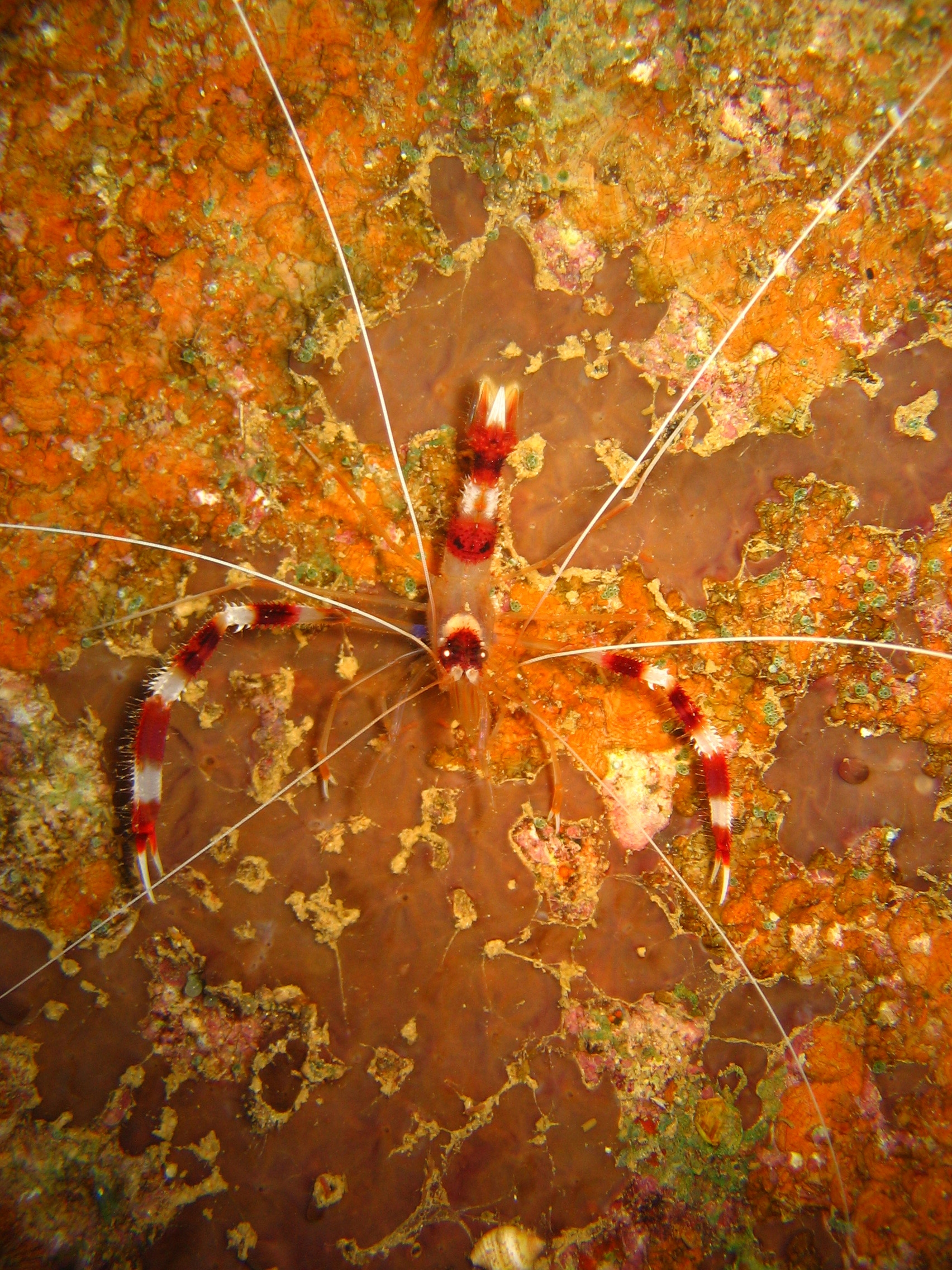
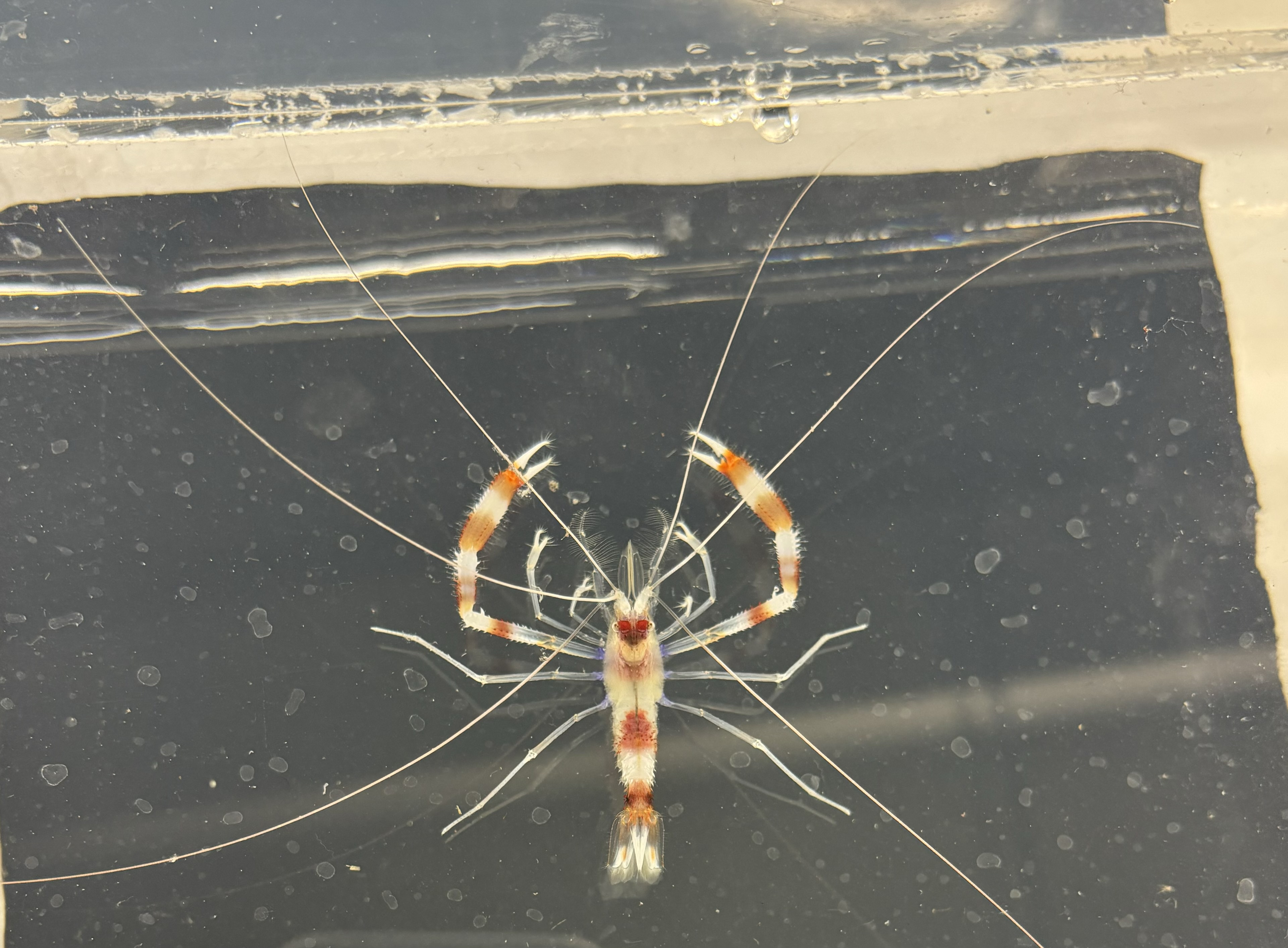
Top dorsal view (Oahu, 2024)
Top view of S. hispidus (Chuuk, Micronesia)

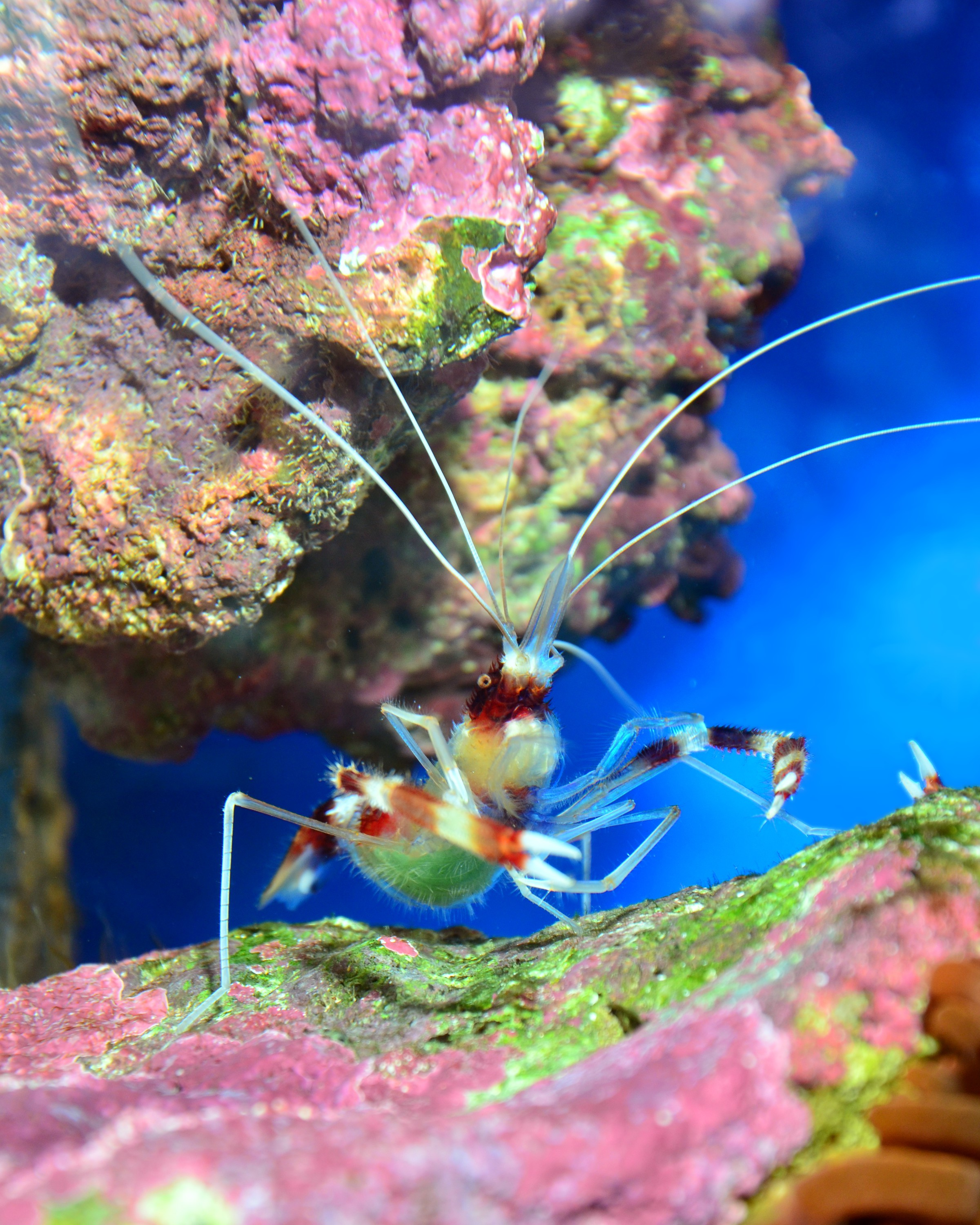
Front view of S. hispidus

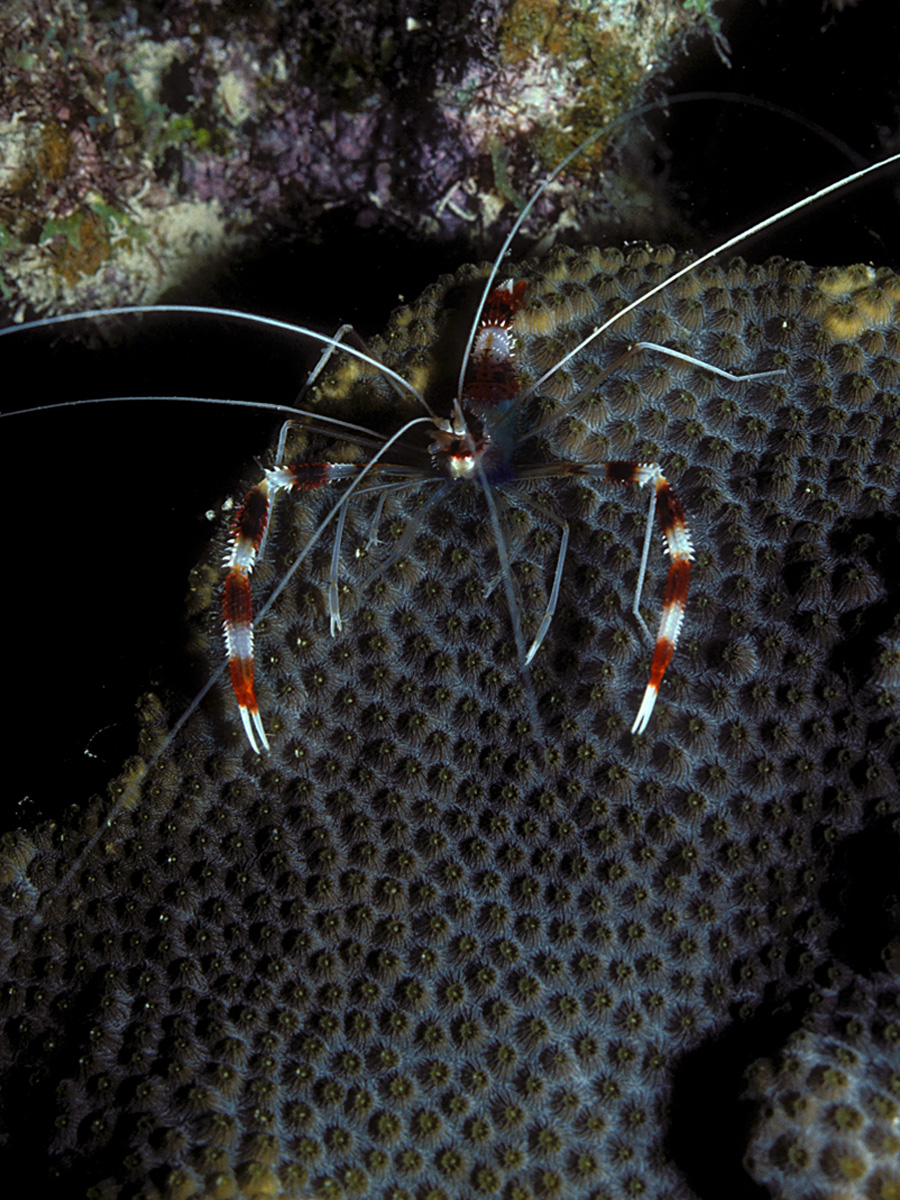
Another S. hispidus
