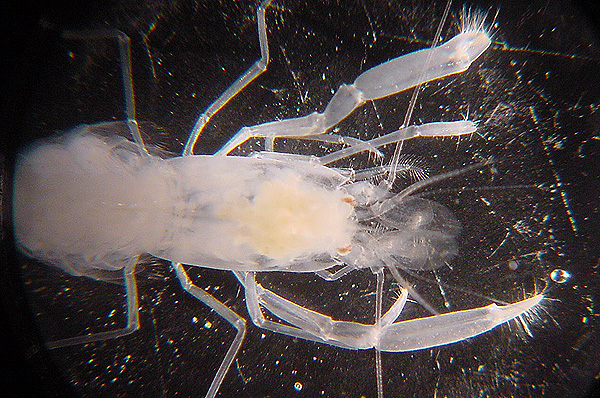
- Spongicoloides

Scientific classification
- Kingdom: Animalia
- Phylum: Arthropoda
- Clade: Pancrustacea
- Class: Malacostraca
- Order: Decapoda
- Suborder: Pleocyemata
- Infraorder: Stenopodidea
- Family: Spongicolidae; Schram, 1986

= Spongicolidae =

Family of crustaceans

Spongicolidae is a family of glass sponge shrimp in the order Decapoda. There are about 8 genera and more than 40 described species in Spongicolidae. Apart from the shallows-dwelling genus Microprosthema, the family consists of glass sponge infauna (or inquiline), living within the body cavity of their sponge, presumably for life with a few other sponge shrimp. The sponge infaunal species most often inhabit Euplectella sponges, but can be found in Hyalonema sieboldii, Dactylocalyx pumiceus, Regradella phoenix, and R. okinosena.

== Genera ==
These eight genera belong to the family Spongicolidae:

- Engystenopus Alcock & Anderson, 1894
- Globospongicola Komai & Saito, 2006
- Microprosthema Stimpson, 1860
- Paraspongicola de Saint Laurent & Cleva, 1981
- Spongicola de Haan, 1844
- Spongicoloides Hansen, 1908
- Spongiocaris Bruce & Baba, 1973
- † Jilinicaris Schram, Shen, Vonk & Taylor, 2000
