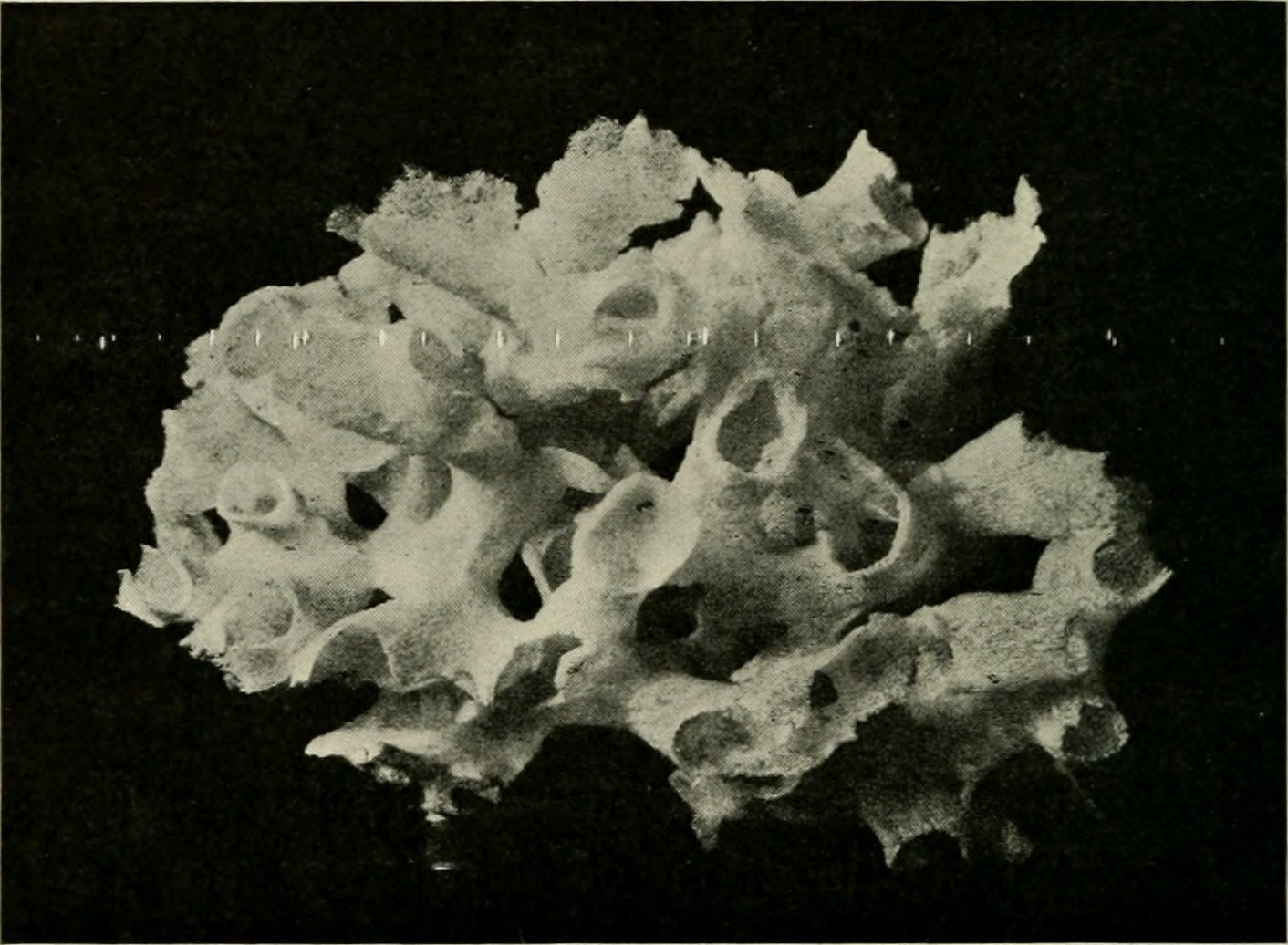
- Farrea occa, in the family Farreidae

Scientific classification
- Domain: Eukaryota
- Kingdom: Animalia
- Phylum: Porifera
- Class: Hexactinellida
- Order: Sceptrulophora
- Family: Farreidae; Gray, 1867

= Farreidae =

Farreidae Temporal range: Jurassic–Recent

Order of hexactinellid sponges

Farreidae is a family of glass sponges in the order Sceptrulophora.

== Taxonomy ==
Genera in this family include:

- Asceptrulum Duplessis & Reiswig, 2004
- Aspidoscopulia Reiswig, 2002
- Claviscopulia Schulze, 1899
- Farrea Bowerbank, 1862
- Lonchiphora Ijima, 1927
