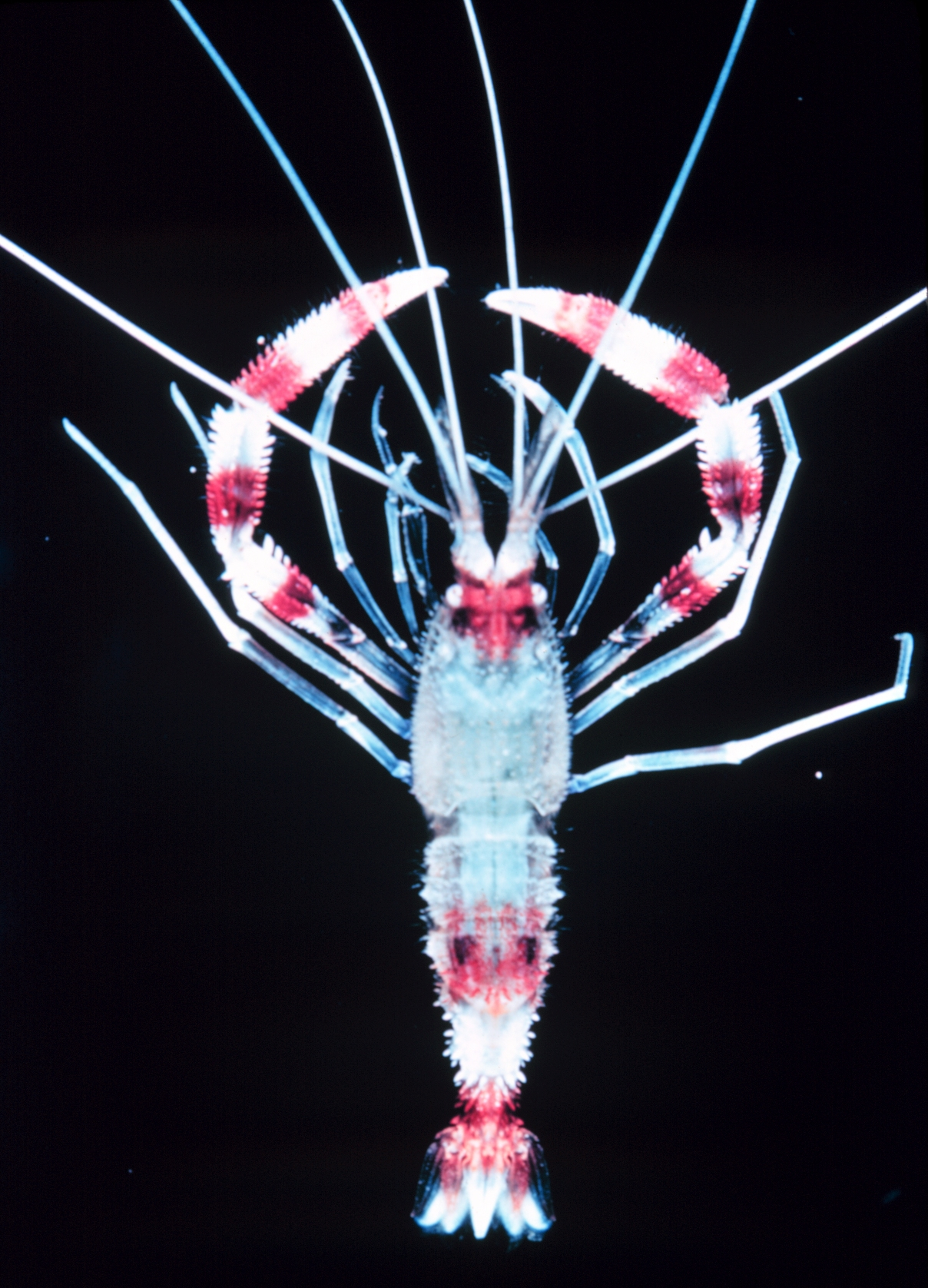
- Stenopus hispidus

Scientific classification
- Kingdom: Animalia
- Phylum: Arthropoda
- Clade: Pancrustacea
- Class: Malacostraca
- Order: Decapoda
- Suborder: Pleocyemata
- Infraorder: Stenopodidea; Claus, 1872

Families
- Macromaxillocarididae Alvarez, Iliffe & Villalobos, 2006; Spongicolidae Schram, 1986; Stenopodidae Claus, 1872

Synonyms
- Euzygida

= Stenopodidea =

Stenopodidea Temporal range: Late Devonian–Recent

Infraorder of crustaceans

The Stenopodidea or boxer shrimps are a small group of decapod crustaceans. Often confused with Caridea shrimp or Dendrobranchiata prawns, they are neither, belonging to their own group.

== Anatomy ==
They can be differentiated from the Dendrobranchiata prawns by their lack of branching gills, and by the fact that they brood their eggs instead of directly releasing them into the water. They differ from the Caridea shrimp by their greatly enlarged third pair of legs.

== Taxonomy ==
Stenopodidea belongs to the order Decapoda, and is most closely related to the Caridea and Procarididea infraorders of shrimp. The cladogram below shows Stenopodidea's relationships to other relatives within Decapoda, from analysis by Wolfe et al., 2019.

- Decapoda
  - - Dendrobranchiata (prawns)
  - Pleocyemata
    - - Stenopodidea (boxer shrimp)
      - - Procarididea
        - Caridea ("true" shrimp)
    - Reptantia (crawling / walking decapods)
      - - Achelata (spiny lobsters and slipper lobsters)
        - - Polychelida (benthic crustaceans)
          - Glypheidea (glypheoid lobsters)
          - Astacidea (lobsters and crayfish)
      - - Axiidea (mud shrimp, ghost shrimp, and burrowing shrimp)
        - - Gebiidea (mud lobsters and mud shrimp)
          - - Anomura (hermit crabs and allies)
            - Brachyura ("true" crabs)

There are 71 extant species currently recognized within Stenopodidea, divided into 12 genera. Three fossil species are also recognized, each belonging to a separate genus. The earliest fossil assigned to the Stenopodidea is Devonostenopus pennsylvaniensis from the Devonian. Until D. pennsylvaniensis was discovered, the oldest known member of the group was Jilinicaris chinensis from the Late Cretaceous.

The cladogram below shows Stenopodidea's internal relationships:

- Stenopodidea
  - Stenopodidae
  - - Macromaxillocarididae
    - Spongicolidae

Stenopodidea comprises the following families and genera:

- †Dubiostenopus Alencar et al. 2023
- Macromaxillocarididae Alvarez, Iliffe & Villalobos, 2006
  - Macromaxillocaris Alvarez, Iliffe & Villalobos, 2006
- Spongicolidae Schram, 1986
  - Engystenopus Alcock & Anderson, 1894
  - Globospongicola Komai & Saito, 2006
  - †Jilinicaris Schram, Shen, Vonk & Taylor, 2000
  - Microprosthema Stimpson, 1860
  - Paraspongicola De Saint Laurent & Cléva, 1981
  - Spongicola De Haan, 1844
  - Spongicoloides Hansen, 1908
  - Spongiocaris Bruce & Baba, 1973
- Stenopodidae Claus, 1872
  - †Devonostenopus Jones et al., 2014
  - Juxtastenopus Goy, 2010
  - Odontozona Holthuis, 1946
  - †Phoenice Garassino, 2001
  - Richardina A. Milne-Edwards, 1881
  - Stenopus Latreille, 1819
