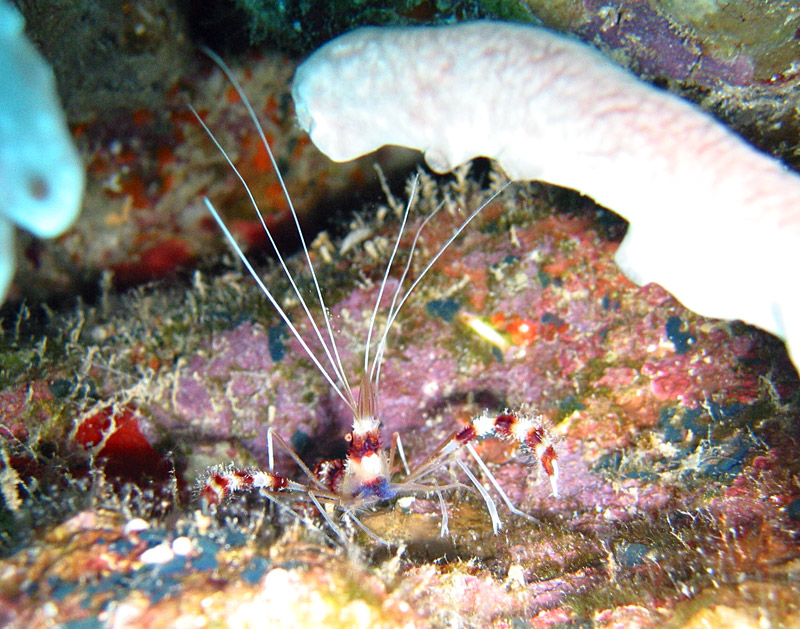
- Stenopus hispidus

Scientific classification
- Domain: Eukaryota
- Kingdom: Animalia
- Phylum: Arthropoda
- Class: Malacostraca
- Order: Decapoda
- Suborder: Pleocyemata
- Family: Stenopodidae
- Genus: Stenopus; Latreille, 1819

Type species
- Palaemon hispidus Olivier, 1811

= Stenopus =

Genus of crustaceans

Stenopus is a genus of swimming decapod crustaceans containing eleven species, including Stenopus hispidus, a common aquarium pet. Stenopus contains the following species:

- Stenopus chrysexanthus Goy, 1992
- Stenopus cyanoscelis Goy, 1984
- Stenopus devaneyi Goy & Randall in Goy, 1984
- Stenopus earlei Goy & Randall in Goy, 1984
- Stenopus goyi Saito, Okuno & Chan, 2009
- Stenopus hispidus (Olivier, 1811)
- Stenopus pyrsonotus Goy & Devaney, 1980
- Stenopus sayaensis Chen & Chan, 2023
- Stenopus scutellatus Rankin, 1898
- Stenopus spinosus Risso, 1826
- Stenopus tenuirostris De Man, 1888
- Stenopus zanzibaricus Bruce, 1976
