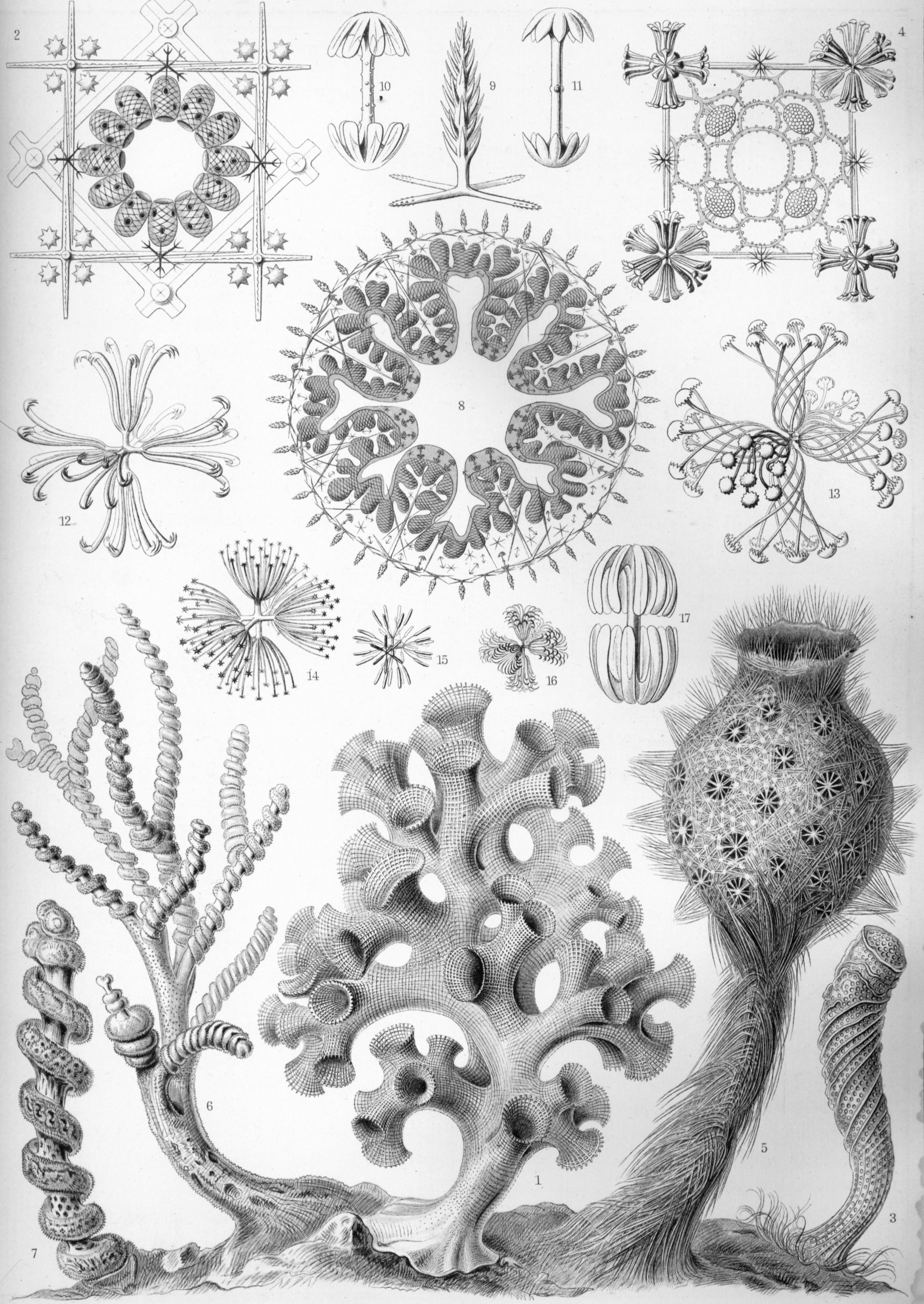

Scientific classification
- Kingdom: Animalia
- Phylum: Porifera
- Class: Hexactinellida
- Subclass: Hexasterophora; Schulze, 1886

Subgroups
- Order Lychniscosida; Order Lyssacinosida; Order Sceptrulophora; incertae sedis; Family Dactylocalycidae

Synonyms
- Aulocalycoida Tabachnick & Reiswig, 2000; Hexactinosida Schrammen, 1912

= Hexasterophora =

Hexasterophora Temporal range: Ordovician – Recent

Subclass of Hexactinellid sponges

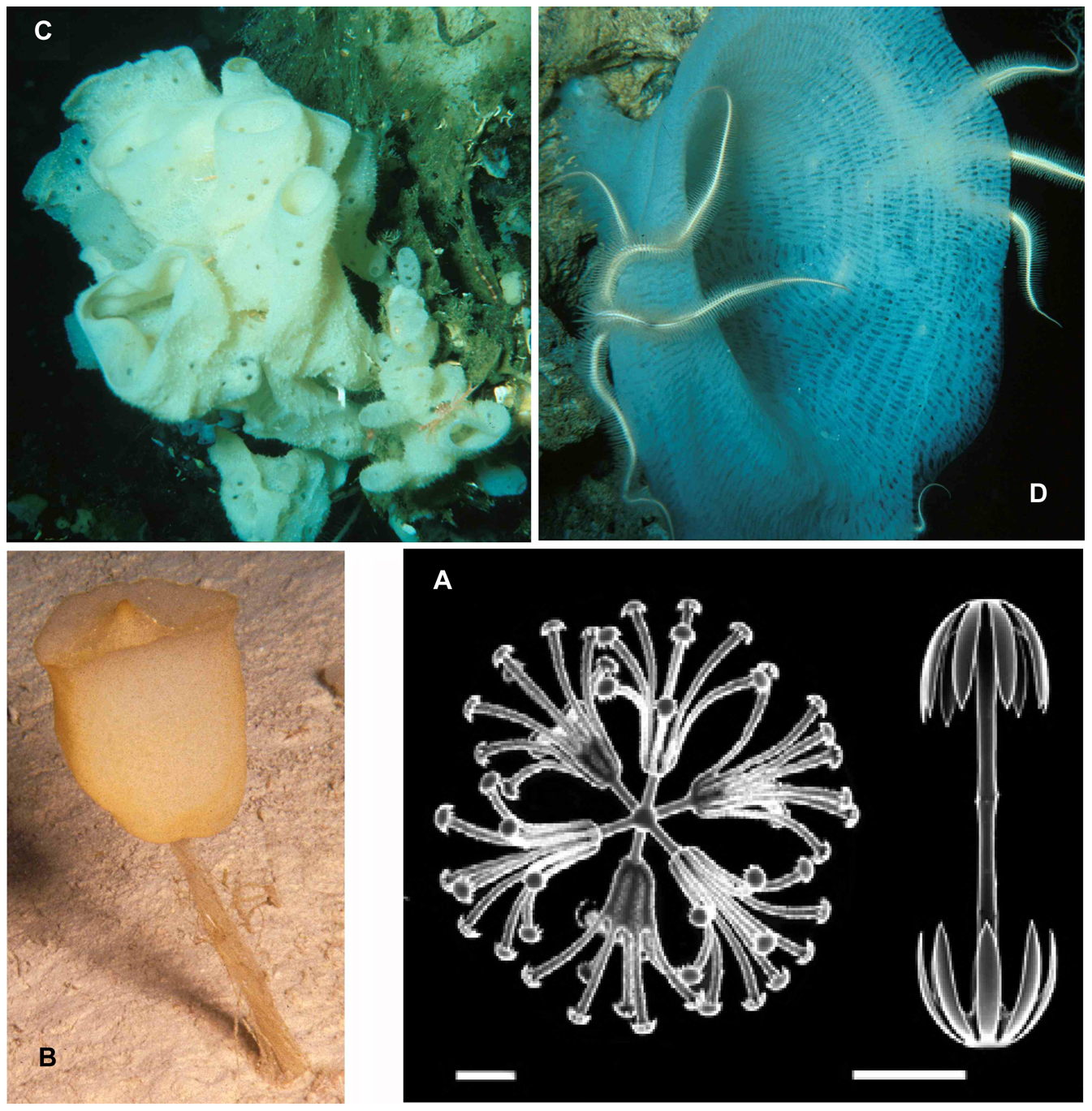
Atlantisella (order Lyssacinosida, C), Lefroyella (order Sceptrulophora, D), and a hexaster microsclere (A, left) in a collage of hexactinellids.

Hexasterophora are a subclass of glass sponges in the class Hexactinellida. Most living hexasterophorans can be divided into three orders: Lyssacinosida, Lychniscosida, and Sceptrulophora. Like other glass sponges, hexasterophorans have skeletons composed of overlapping six-rayed spicules. In addition, they can be characterized by the presence of hexasters, a type of microsclere (microscopic spicules) with six rays unfurling into multi-branched structures.

A living sponge is commonly firmly attached by its base to a hard substratum; less often rooted by the anchoring spicules and rarely inserted directly into the loose bottom sediments.

The three orders are differentiated by the extent to which adjacent spicules have fused. The oldest order, without fused spicules, is Lyssacinosida (or Lyssacinosa), which appears in the Ordovician. The other two orders have fully fused their spicules into a framework of dictyonal strands. The most fused order is Lychniscosida (or Lychniscosa), which develops octahedral frames (lychniscs) around the nodes between their dictyonal strands. Lychniscosa fossils first appeared in the Middle Jurassic.

Sponges intermediate between these two extremes were historically placed into the order Hexactinosa (or Hexactinosida). Genetic sequencing has determined that this proposed order is polyphyletic, with its constituents split between the valid order Sceptrulophora (bearing sceptrules) and the family Dactylocalycidae (lacking sceptrules). The oldest "hexactinosan" fossils are from the Devonian.
