= Dactylocalycidae =

Scientific classification
- Kingdom: Animalia
- Phylum: Porifera
- Class: Hexactinellida
- Order: Lychniscosida
- Family: Dactylocalycidae; Gray, 1867

Family of sponges

Dactylocalycidae is a family of sponges belonging to the order Lychniscosida.

Genera:

- Dactylocalyx Stutchbury, 1841
- Exanthesis Regnard, 1925
- Iphiteon Bowerbank, 1869
- Moretiella Breistroffer, 1949
- Ophrystoma Zittel, 1878
- Paraplocia Pomel, 1872
