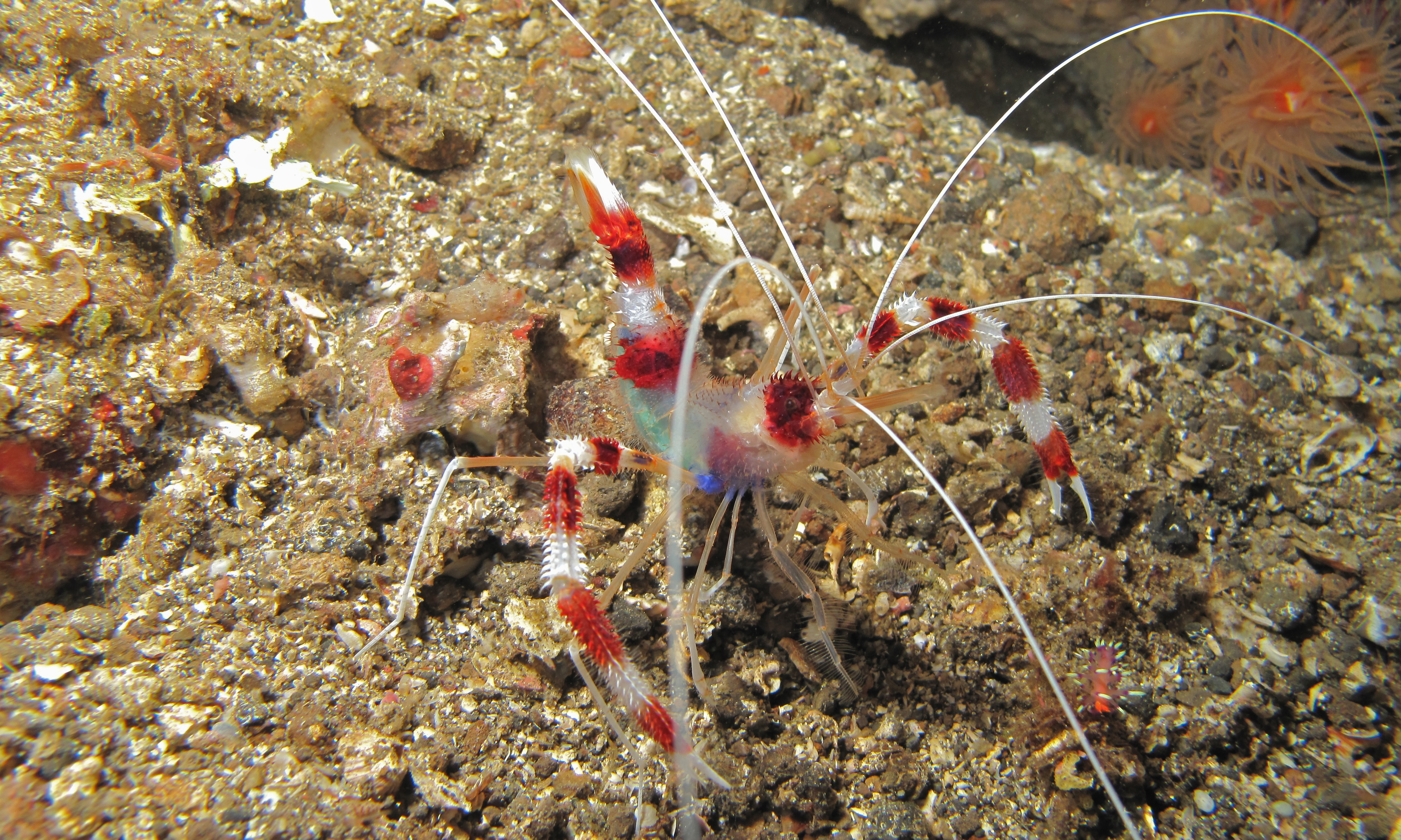
- Stenopus hispidus, banded boxer shrimp, Indonesia

Scientific classification
- Domain: Eukaryota
- Kingdom: Animalia
- Phylum: Arthropoda
- Class: Malacostraca
- Order: Decapoda
- Suborder: Pleocyemata
- Infraorder: Stenopodidea
- Family: Stenopodidae; Claus, 1872

Synonyms
- Stenopidae Huxley, 1879

= Stenopodidae =

Stenopodidae Temporal range: Devonian–Recent

Family of crustaceans

Stenopodidae is a family of decapods in the order Decapoda, sometimes known as boxer shrimp. There are about 6 genera and more than 30 described species in Stenopodidae. The oldest record of the family dates to the Devonian.

== Genera ==
These six genera belong to the family Stenopodidae:

- Juxtastenopus Goy, 2010
- Odontozona Holthuis, 1946
- Richardina A. Milne Edwards, 1881
- Sthenopus Latreille, 1819
- † Devonostenopus Jones et al., 2014
- † Phoenice Garassino, 2000
