= Lychniscosida =

Lychniscosida Temporal range: Middle Jurassic–recent

Scientific classification
- Kingdom: Animalia
- Phylum: Porifera
- Class: Hexactinellida
- Subclass: Hexasterophora
- Order: Lychniscosida; Schrammen, 1903

Order of sponges

Lychniscosida (sometimes spelled Lychniscosa) is an order of sponges belonging to the class Hexactinellida and subclass Hexasterophora. They are dictyonal sponges (with parenchymal spicules fully fused into a 3D framework) characterized by the presence of additional struts at the nodes of the skeleton. These struts create octahedral frames, known as lychniscs ("lanterns").

Most members of the order are extinct, with their highest diversity as major reef builders in the Jurassic and Cretaceous periods. A few uncertain claims of Triassic lychniscosids have also been reported from China. Only three genera are still alive today: Lychnocystis (family Aulocystidae), Neoaulocystis (family Aulocystidae), and Scleroplegma (family Diapleuridae).

== Families ==
- Aulocystidae [Cretaceous–Holocene]
- †Callodictyonidae [Upper Jurassic–Oligocene]
- †Calyptrellidae [Upper Cretaceous]
- †Camerospongiidae [Cretaceous]
- †Coeloptychidae [Cretaceous]
- †Cypelliidae [Jurassic]
- †Dactylocalycidae [Jurassic–Upper Cretaceous]
- Diapleuridae [Eocene–Holocene]
- †Polyblastidiidae [Upper Jurassic–Cretaceous]
- †Sporadopylidae [Upper Jurassic–Cretaceous]
- †Ventriculitidae [Jurassic–Upper Cretaceous]
