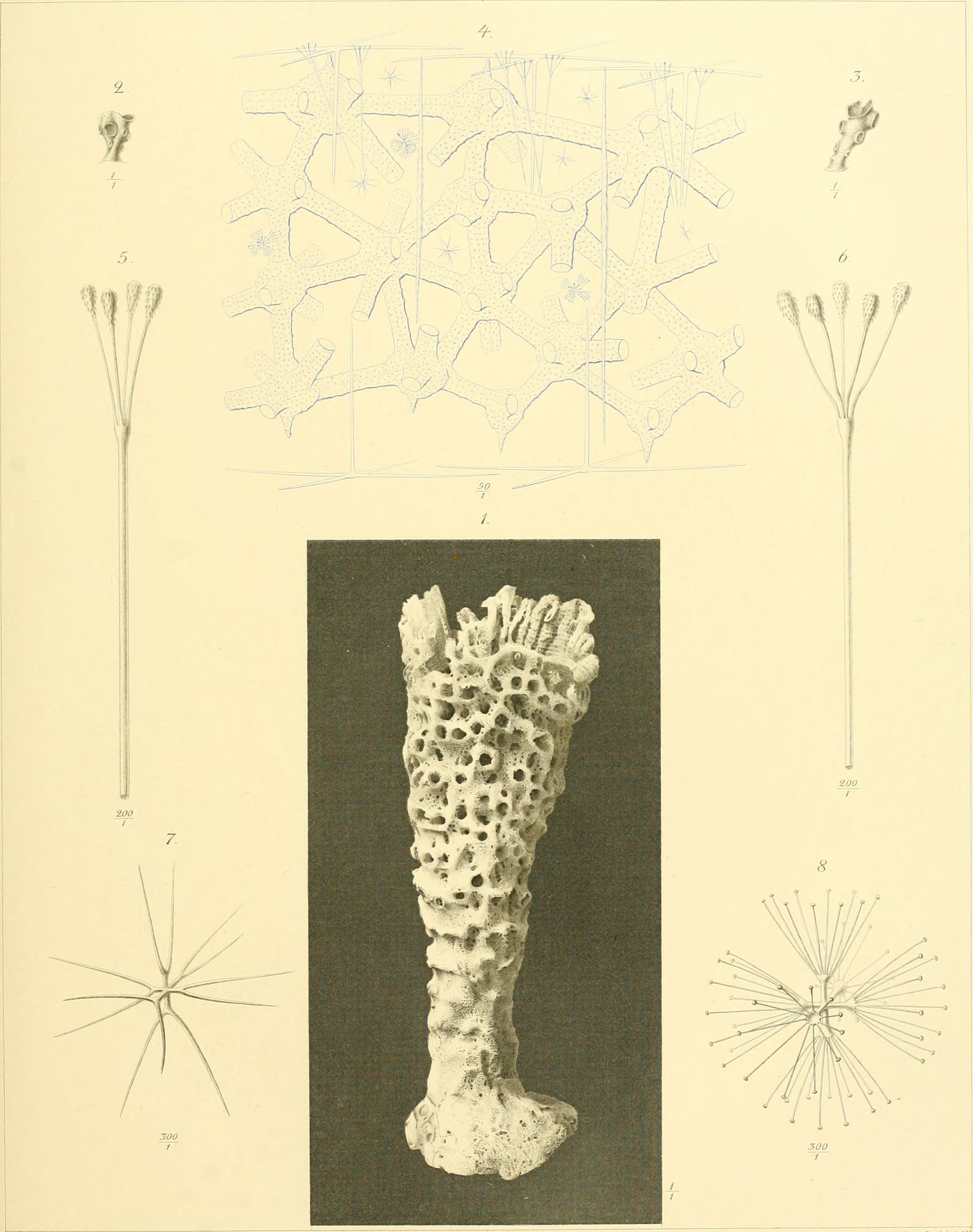
- Lefroyella decora. Plate LXXXII from Report on the scientific results of the voyage of H.M.S. Challenger during the years 1873-76

Scientific classification
- Kingdom: Animalia
- Phylum: Porifera
- Class: Hexactinellida
- Order: Sceptrulophora
- Family: Euretidae; Zittel, 1877

Subfamilies
- Chonelasmatinae Schrammen, 1912; Euretinae Zittel, 1877

= Euretidae =

Family of hexactinellid sponges

Euretidae is a family of glass sponges in the order Sceptrulophora.
