= Sceptrulophora =

Sceptrulophora Temporal range: Jurassic–Recent

Scientific classification
- Kingdom: Animalia
- Phylum: Porifera
- Class: Hexactinellida
- Subclass: Hexasterophora
- Order: Sceptrulophora; Mehl, 1992

Families
- See text.

Order of hexactinellid sponges

Sceptrulophora (from Ancient Greek, σκῆπτρον, skêptron - "sceptre" and -φόρος, -phóros - "bearing") is an order of hexactinellid sponges (glass sponges). They are characterized by sceptrules, a type of microsclere (microscopic spicule) with a single straight rod terminating at a bundle of spines or knobs. An anchor- or nail-shaped sceptrule is called a clavule. A fork-shaped sceptrule, ending at a few large tines, is called a scopule. A broom-shaped sceptrule, ending at many small bristles, is called a sarule.

Unlike members of the order Lyssacinosida, sceptrulophorans have dictyonal strands, meaning that their macroscleres (larger spicules) are fully fused together into a 3D framework. They can likewise be differentiated from the order Lychniscosida by the absence of octahedral frames (lychniscs) at the nodes of their macroscleres. Glass sponges with these two traits (dictyonal strands and a lack of lychniscs) have historically been placed in the order Hexactinosida (sometimes spelled Hexactinosa).

Many species in "Hexactinosida" also qualify as members of Sceptrulophora, though these two proposed orders are not identical. Sponges in the family Dactylocalycidae have dictyonal strands and lack lychniscs, but also lack sceptrules. Genetic testing has argued that dactylocalycids are more closely related to Lyssacinosida, rather than sceptrule-bearing sponges. This renders Hexactinosida polyphyletic while maintaining the monophyly of Sceptrulophora.

Species of the order Sceptrulophora have existed since the Jurassic period, and still flourish today.

== Families ==
- Aphrocallistidae Gray, 1867
- Auloplacidae Schrammen, 1912
- Craticulariidae Rauff, 1893
- Cribrospongiidae Roemer, 1864
- Euretidae Zittel, 1877
- Farreidae Gray, 1872
- Fieldingiidae Tabachnick & Janussen, 2004
- Tretodictyidae Schulze, 1886
- Uncinateridae Reiswig, 2002
- incertae sedis
  - Coronete Ijima, 1927
  - Cyrtaulon Schulze, 1886
  - Lefroyella Thomson, 1877
  - Verrucoeloidea Reid, 1969
