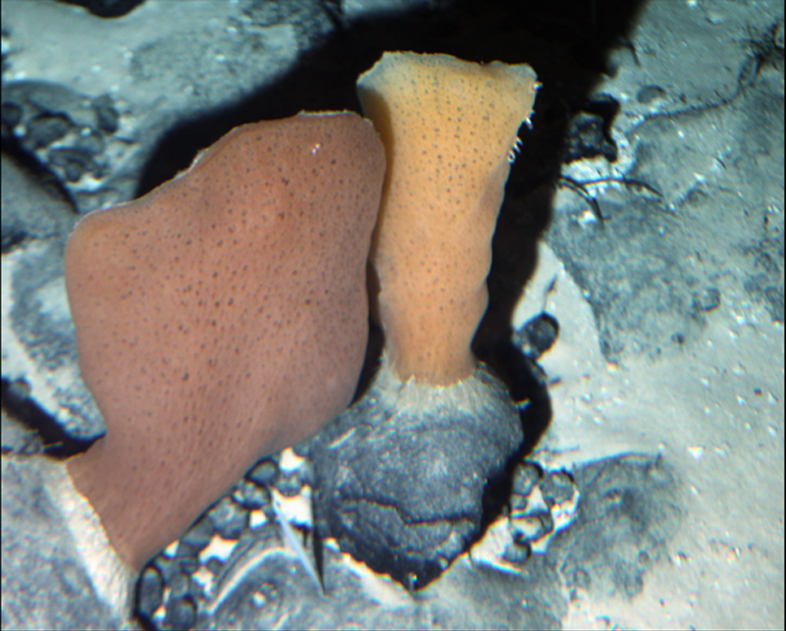
- Poliopogon amadou

Scientific classification
- Domain: Eukaryota
- Kingdom: Animalia
- Phylum: Porifera
- Class: Hexactinellida
- Order: Amphidiscosida
- Family: Pheronematidae
- Genus: Poliopogon; Thomson, 1877

= Poliopogon =

Genus of sponges

Poliopogon is a genus of sponges belonging to the family Pheronematidae.

The species of this genus are found in Pacific Ocean.

Species:

- Poliopogon amadou Thomson, 1877
- Poliopogon canaliculatus Wang, Wang, Zhang & Liu, 2016
- Poliopogon claviculus Tabachnick & Lévi, 2000
- Poliopogon distortus L.i.Gong, 2018
- Poliopogon maitai Tabachnick, 1988
- Poliopogon mendocino Reiswig, 1999
- Poliopogon micropentactinus Tabachnick & Lévi, 2000
- Poliopogon microuncinata Kersken, Janussen & Martínez Arbizu, 2018
- Poliopogon zonecus Tabachnick & Lévi, 2000
