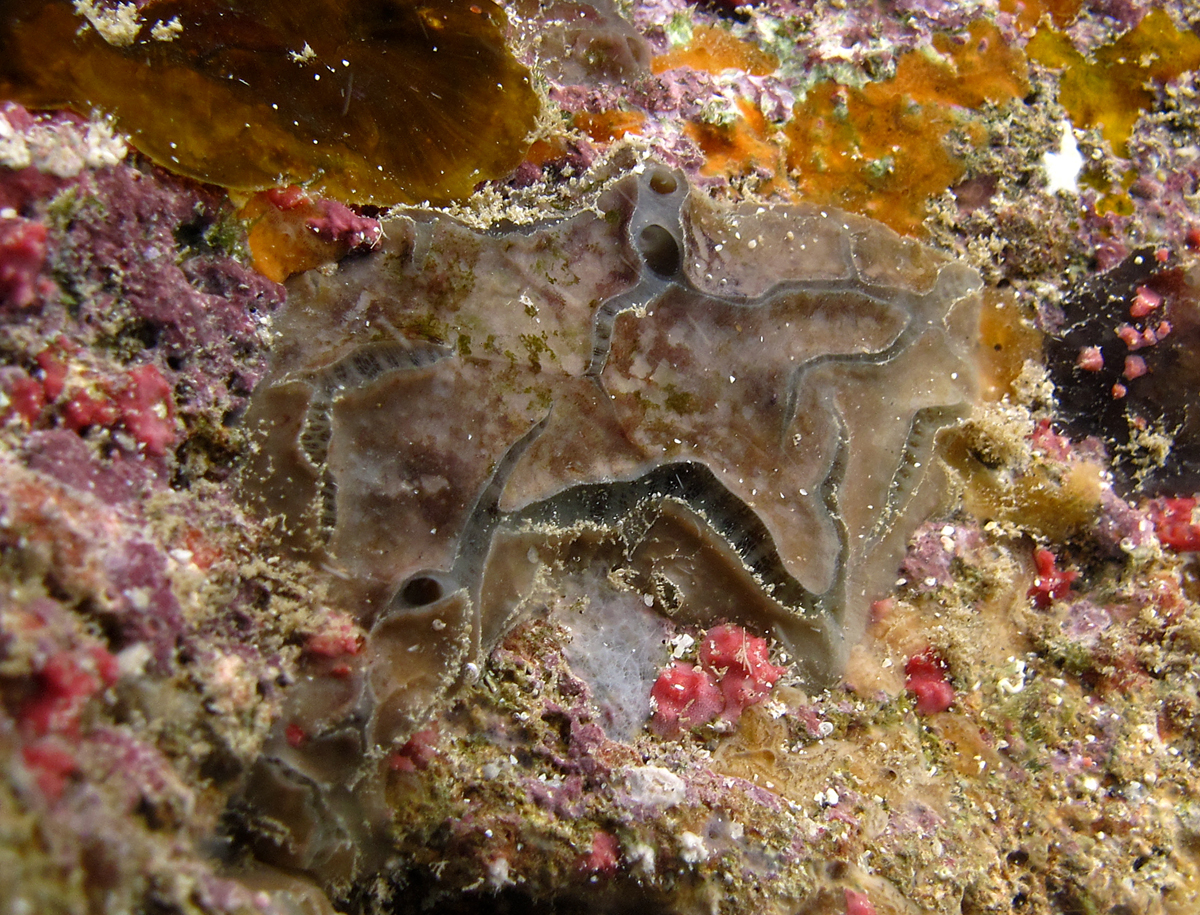

Scientific classification
- Domain: Eukaryota
- Kingdom: Animalia
- Phylum: Porifera
- Class: Demospongiae
- Order: Clionaida
- Family: Placospongiidae
- Genus: Placospongia; Grey, 1867

Species
- see text

Synonyms
- Physcaphora Hanitsch, 1895

= Placospongia =

Genus of sponges

Placospongia is a genus of sea sponges belonging to the family Placospongiidae.

This genus is characterized by a high density of siliceous spicules. Members of this genus are known to be eaten by hawksbill turtles.

== Species ==
- Placospongia carinata
- Placospongia melobesioides
