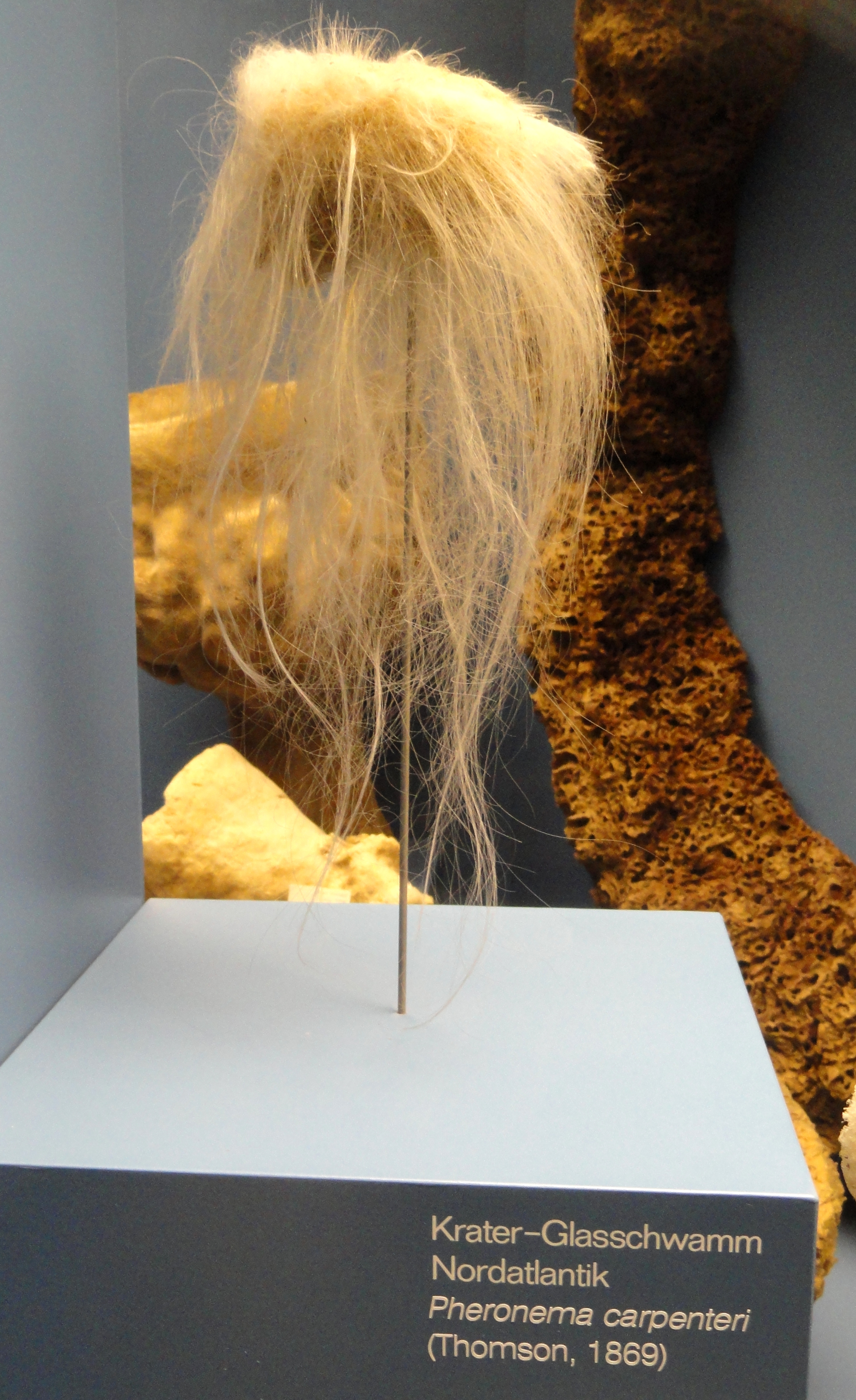
- Pheronema carpenteri

Scientific classification
- Domain: Eukaryota
- Kingdom: Animalia
- Phylum: Porifera
- Class: Hexactinellida
- Order: Amphidiscosida
- Family: Pheronematidae

= Pheronematidae =

Family of sponges

Pheronematidae is a family of sponges belonging to the order Amphidiscosida.

Genera:

- Hernandeziana Strand, 1932
- Ijimalophus Van Soest & Hooper, 2020
- Pheronema Leidy, 1868
- Pheronemoides Li, 2017
- Platylistrum Schulze, 1904
- Poliopogon Thomson, 1877
- Schulzeviella Tabachnick, 1990
- Semperella Gray, 1868
- Sericolophus Ijima, 1901
