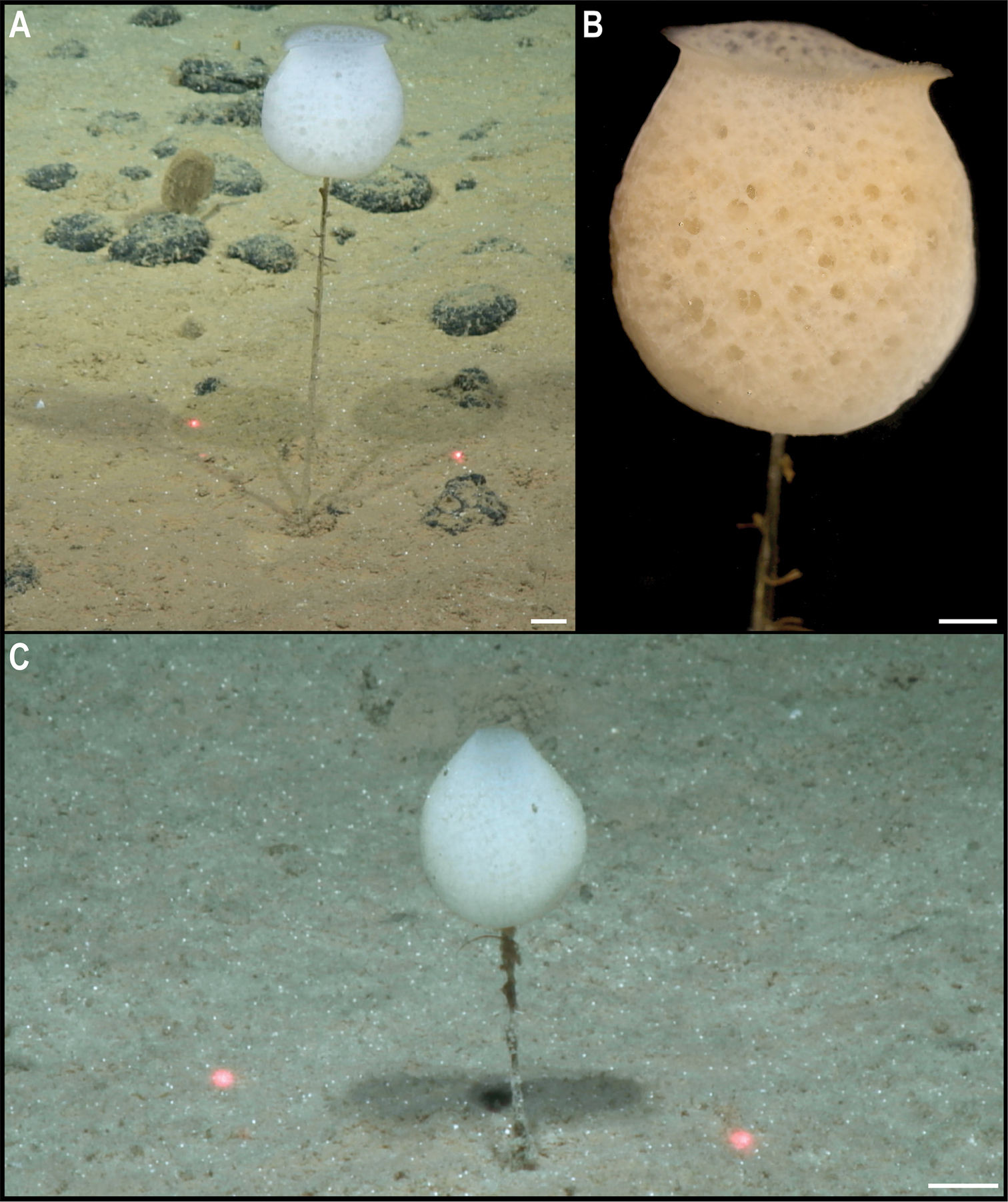
- Hyalonema sp. (Family: Hyalonematidae) anchored in soft sediment.

Scientific classification
- Kingdom: Animalia
- Phylum: Porifera
- Class: Hexactinellida
- Order: Amphidiscosida
- Family: Hyalonematidae

= Hyalonematidae =

Family of sponges

Hyalonematidae is a family of deep-sea glass sponges (class Hexactinellida) comprising five genera. They are known for their unique siliceous spicules called amphidiscs and skeleton structure primarily composed of diactins, large, rod-like megasclere spicules found within the sponge's internal tissue (choanosome). Hyalonematidae have been recorded at depths of up to 6000 meters and have a global distribution, though they have not been documented in the Arctic Ocean. Initially mistaken for corals due to their fibrous base, Hyalonematidae were later recognized as glass sponges and classified within the order Amphidiscosida. These sponges are generally hermaphroditic and reproduce both sexually and asexually.

== Taxonomy ==
The family Hyalonematidae includes five genera: Hyalonema characterized by long basalia forming a stalk-like structure. Chalaronema, recognized by its unique skeletal framework. Composocalyx, characterized by its distinct cup-shaped body morphology. Lophophysema, known for its elaborate spicule arrangements, and Tabachnickia, A more recently described genus within the family.

Genera:

- Chalaronema Ijima, 1927
- Composocalyx Schulze, 1904
- Compsocalyx Schulze, 1904
- Hyalonema Gray, 1832
- Lophophysema Schulze, 1900
- Tabachnickia Özdikmen, 2010

== Morphological Features ==
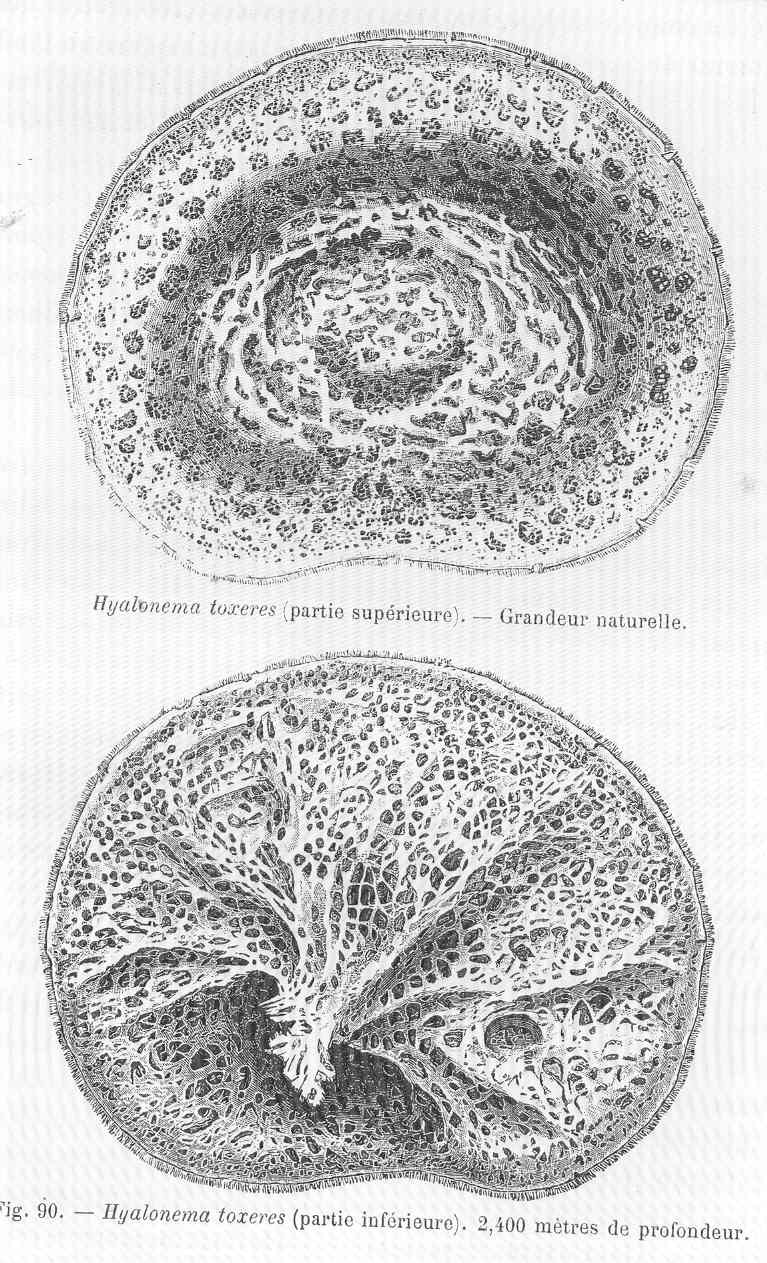
Hyalonema sp. Drawing of intricate lattice-like structure of the sponge's siliceous skeleton.

Members of Hyalonematidae have a skeleton primarily made of siliceous spicules, with amphidiscs being a defining microsclere type. The body structure is typically supported by pentactinal (five-rayed) megascleres, and many species have prostalia, bristle-like structures, formed by single-rayed spicules. In certain species, the basalia are bundled to form anchoring structures that suspend the sponge above the seabed, this is an adaptation to their deep-sea habitats.

== Habitat ==
These sponges are found in the deep sea region of the ocean anchored to soft sediments like deep-sea mud or sand, staying fixed and stable with an anchoring structure. Hyalonematidae inhabit ocean depths ranging from 100 to 6,235 meters and are widely distributed across the globe, with the exception of the Arctic Ocean.

Fossil evidence suggests that hexactinellids were once found in a broader range of environments.

== Reproduction ==
Specific details about Hyalonematidae methods of reproduction are not extensively researched. However, sponges in general typically reproduce through both sexual and asexual means. Asexual reproduction in sponges often occurs through budding or fragmentation. In this process, parts of the sponge can break off and develop into new individuals, allowing for rapid population growth.

Sexual reproduction in sponges involves the production of gametes. Sponges are generally hermaphroditic, meaning they can produce both eggs and sperm. Their reproductive cycle involves both eggs and sperm being released into the water column and taken in by other sponges through their filtration system (broadcast spawning) or only the sperm is released into the water and eggs will be retained in the female (brooding).

Environmental conditions, such as temperature, oxygen levels, and nutrient availability, may influence reproductive timing and larval settlement.
