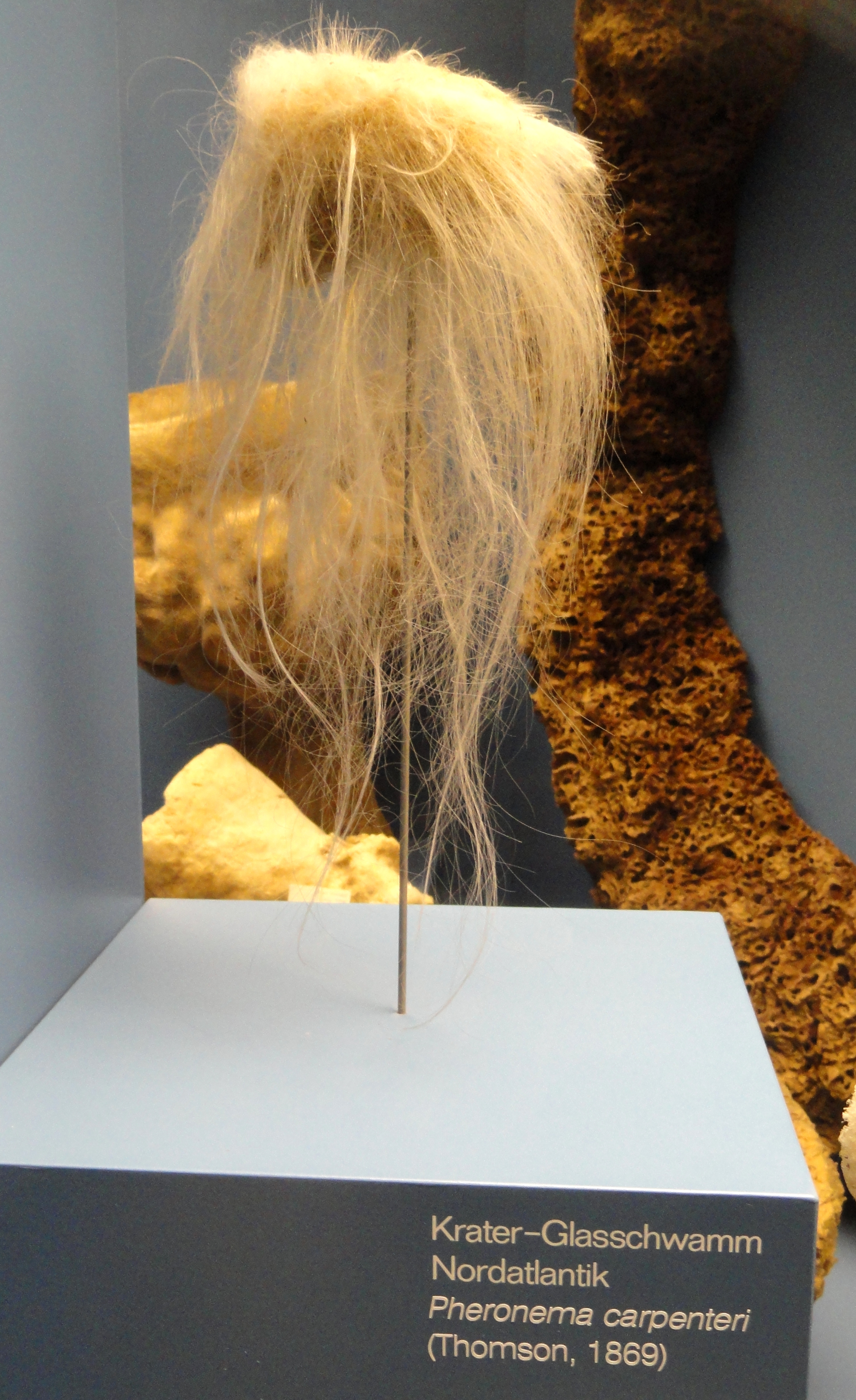
- Specimen of Pheronema carpenteri on exhibit in Naturmuseum Senckenberg

Scientific classification
- Kingdom: Animalia
- Phylum: Porifera
- Class: Hexactinellida
- Subclass: Amphidiscophora; Schulze, 1886
- Order: Amphidiscosida; Schrammen, 1924

= Amphidiscosida =

Amphidiscosida Temporal range: Cambrian–Recent

Order of sponges

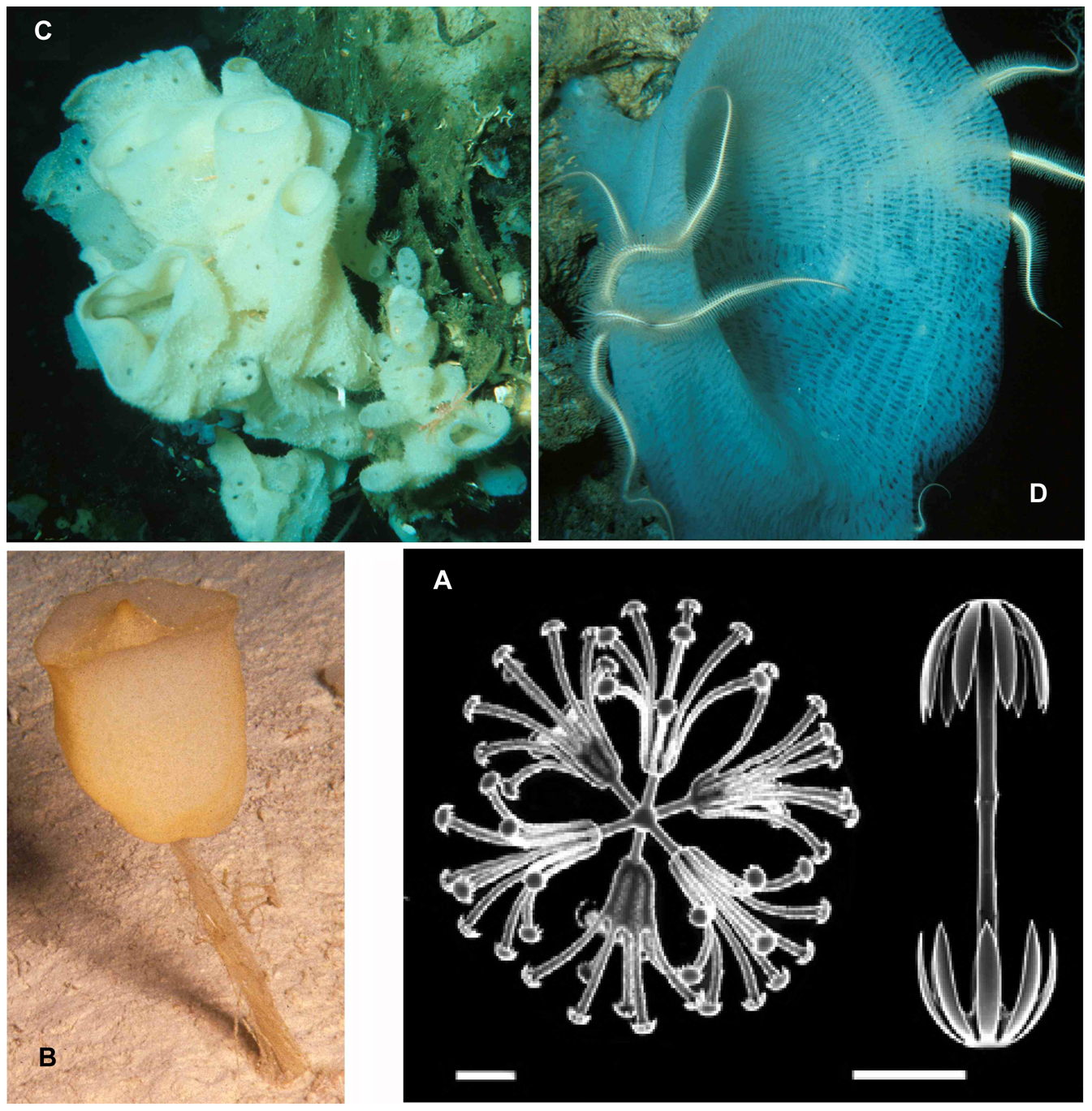
Hyalonema (family Hyalonematidae, B) and an amphidisc microsclere (A, right) in a collage of hexactinellids.

Amphidiscosida (sometimes spelled Amphidiscosa) is an order of hexactinellids (glass sponges). The Amphidiscosida are commonly regarded as the only living sponges in the subclass Amphidiscophora.

As the name implies, the Amphidiscosida are characterized by a special type of microsclere (microscopic spicules): amphidiscs. Amphidiscs are rod-like spicules with an equal-sized umbel (a whorl of backswept hooks) at each end. The skeleton is primarily formed by megascleres (large spicules). In living species, most megascleres are pentactinal (five-rayed), though fossil species often have a more diverse set of megascleres. Amphidiscosids are often covered with prostalia (bristles), formed by single-rayed spicules. In a few species, basalia (long rooting bristles) in the lower part of the body are bundled together to suspend the body above the seabed as an anchoring structure.

The oldest fossilized amphidiscs are from the Carboniferous, but sponge fossils with spicules similar to Amphidiscosida have existed since the Cambrian period. Three families still flourish in deep marine waters today.

== Families ==
- Hyalonematidae Gray, 1857
- Monorhaphididae Ijima, 1927
- †Pattersoniidae Miller, 1889 [Middle Ordovician–Upper Ordovician]
- †Pelicaspongiidae Rigby, 1970 [Lower Ordovician–Triassic]
- Pheronematidae Gray, 1870
- †Stiodermatidae Finks, 1960 [Lower Cambrian–Permian]
