= Sponge spicule =

Structural element of sea sponges

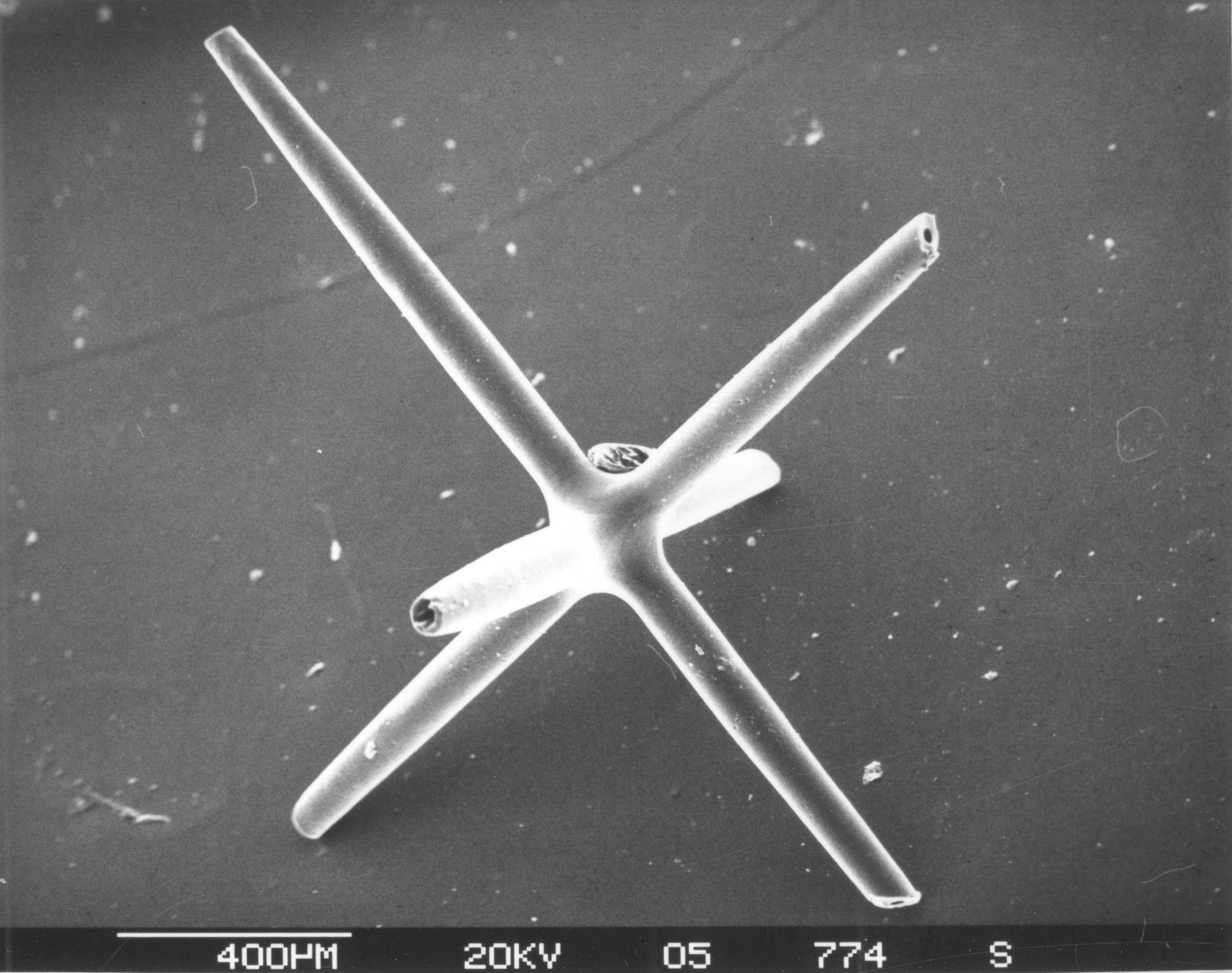
Six-pointed triaxonal siliceous spicule
from a glass sponge

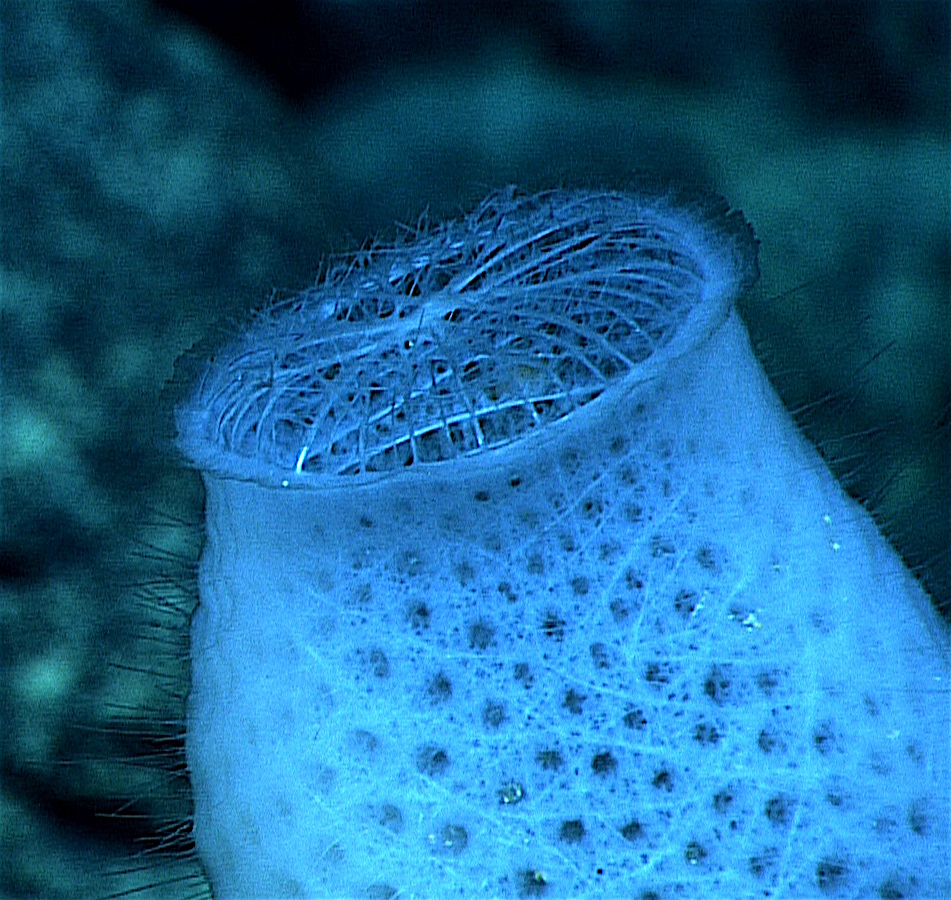
Venus flower basket constructed from
similar spicules

Spicules are structural elements found in most sponges. The meshing of many spicules serves as the sponge's skeleton and thus it provides structural support and a potential defense against predators.

Sponge spicules are made of calcium carbonate or silica. Large spicules visible to the naked eye are referred to as megascleres or macroscleres, while smaller, microscopic ones are termed microscleres. The composition, size, and shape of spicules are major characters in sponge systematics and taxonomy.

== Overview ==
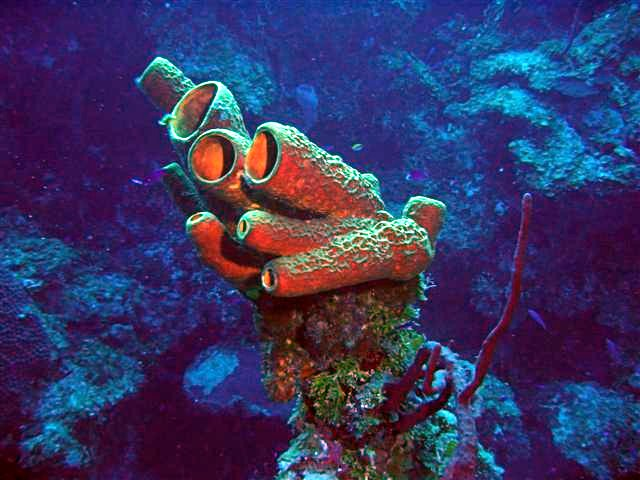
Demosponges can also have siliceous spicules. Some species obtain silica for building spicules by ingesting diatoms.

Sponges are a species-rich clade of the earliest-diverging (most basal) animals. They are distributed globally, with diverse ecologies and functions, and a record spanning at least the entire Phanerozoic.

Most sponges produce skeletons formed by spicules, structural elements that develop in a wide variety of sizes and three dimensional shapes. Among the four sub-clades of Porifera, three (Demospongiae, Hexactinellida, and Homoscleromorpha) produce skeletons of amorphous silica and one (Calcarea) of magnesium-calcite. It is these skeletons that are composed of the elements called spicules. The morphologies of spicules are often unique to clade- or even species-level taxa, and this makes them useful in taxonomic assignments.

=== Research history ===
In 1833, Robert Edmond Grant grouped sponges into a phylum he called Porifera (from the Latin porus meaning "pore" and -fer meaning "bearing"). He described sponges as the simplest of multicellular animals, sessile, marine invertebrates built from soft, spongy (amorphously shaped) material.

Later, the Challenger expedition (1873–1876) discovered deep in the ocean a rich collection of glass sponges (class Hexactinellida), which radically changed this view. These glass sponges were described by Franz Schulze (1840–1921), and came to be regarded as strongly individualised radially symmetric entities representing the phylogenetically oldest class of siliceous sponges. They are eye-catching because of their distinct body plan (see lead image above) which relies on a filigree skeleton constructed using an array of morphologically determined spicules.

Then, during the German Deep Sea Expedition "Valdivia" (1898-1899), Schulze described the largest known siliceous hexactinellid sponge, up to three metres high Monorhaphis chuni. This sponge develops the also largest known bio-silicate structures, giant basal spicules, three metres high and one centimetre thick. With such spicules as a model, basic knowledge on the morphology, formation, and development of the skeletal elements could be elaborated. Spicules are formed by a proteinaceous scaffold which mediates the formation of siliceous lamellae in which the proteins are encased. Up to eight hundred 5 to 10 μm thick lamellae can be concentrically arranged around an axial canal. The silica matrix is composed of almost pure silicon and oxygen, providing it with unusual optophysical properties superior to man-made waveguides.

Since their discovery, hexactinellids were appraised as "the most characteristic inhabitants of the great depths", rivalling in beauty the other class of siliceous Porifera, the demosponges. Their thin network of living tissues is supported by a characteristic skeleton, a delicate scaffold of siliceous spicules, some of which may be fused together by secondary silica deposition to form a rigid framework. The Hexactinellida together with the Demospongiae forms a common taxonomic unit comprising the siliceous sponges. The spicules, the elements from which their skeletons are constructed, are built in a variety of distinct shapes, and are made from silica that is deposited in the form of amorphous opal (SiO_{2}·nH_{2}O).

In evolution, after the Ediacaran period, a third class of Porifera appeared, the Calcarea, which has a calcium-carbonate skeleton.

Sponges have been receiving special attention from researchers since the introduction of molecular biological techniques at the turn of the century, since findings point to sponges as the phylogenetically oldest animal phylum. New information has accumulated concerning the relevance of this phylum for understanding of the dynamics of evolutionary processes that occurred during the Ediacaran, the time prior to the Cambrian Explosion which can be dated back to approximately 540 million years ago. According to molecular data from sponge genes that encode receptors and signal transduction molecules, the Hexactinellida were established to be the phylogenetically oldest class of the Porifera. Based on the discovery that the Porifera share one common ancestor, the Urmetazoa, with the other animals, it was deduced that these animals represent the oldest, still extant animal taxon. Even more, the emergence of these animals could be calculated back to 650–665 million years ago [Ma], a date that was confirmed by fossils records. Hence the Porifera must have lived already prior to the Ediacaran-Cambrian boundary, 542 Ma, and thus their elucidated genetic toolkit may contribute to the understanding of the Ediacaran soft-bodied biota as well, as sketched by Pilcher. It was the evolutionary novelty, the formation of a hard skeleton, that contributed significantly to the radiation of the animals in the late Proterozoic and the construction of the metazoan body plan.

== Spicule types ==
Sponge spicules can be calcareous or siliceous. Siliceous spicules are sometimes embedded in spongin. Spicules are found in a range of symmetry types.

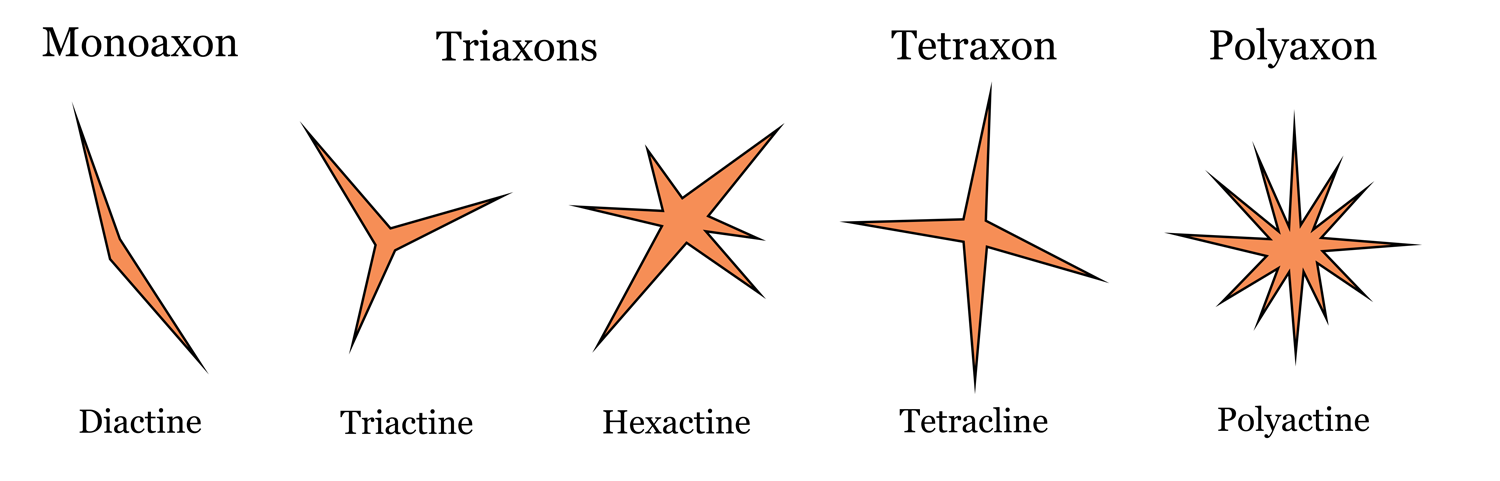
Sponge spicule morphological diversity

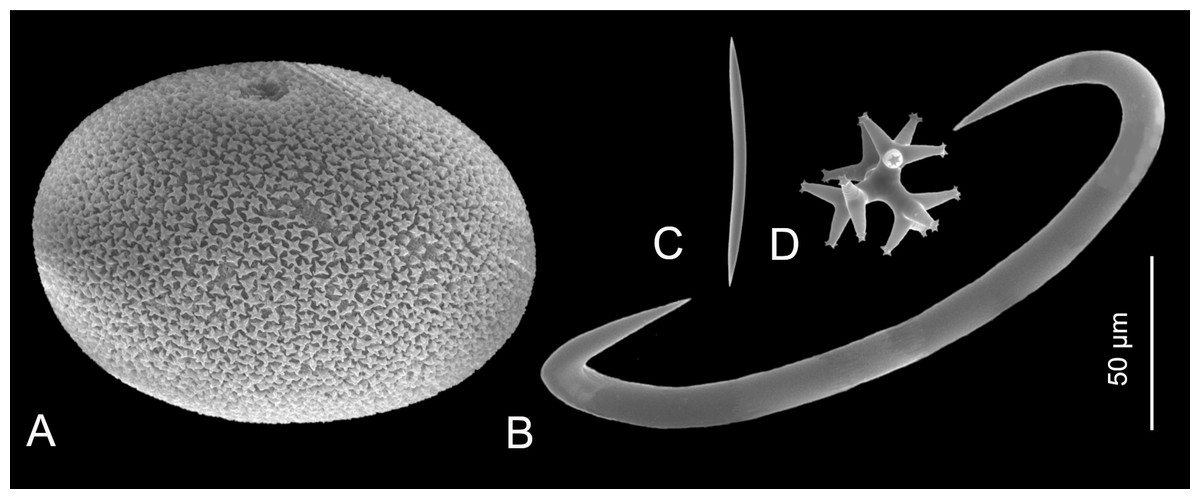
Sizes of different spicule types of marine sponges (A) Microsclere (sterraster) of Geodia spp.; (B) Microsclere (sigma) of Mycale quadripartita; (C) Megasclere (oxea) of Haliclona epiphytica; (D) Spicule tetralophose calthrop of homoscleromorph Plakina (A)

Monaxons form simple cylinders with pointed ends. The ends of diactinal monaxons are similar, whereas monactinal monaxons have different ends: one pointed, one rounded. Diactinal monaxons are classified by the nature of their ends: oxea have pointed ends, and strongyles are rounded. Spine-covered oxea and strongyles are termed acanthoxea and acanthostrongyles, respectively. Monactical monaxons always have one pointed end; they are termed styles if the other end is blunt, tylostyles if their blunt end forms a knob; and acanthostyles if they are covered in spines.

Triaxons have three axes; in triods, each axis bears a similar ray; in pentacts, triaxons have five rays, four of which lie in a single plane; and pinnules are pentacts with large spines on the non-planar ray.

Tetraxons have four axes, and polyaxons more (description of types to be incorporated from). Sigma-C spicules have the shape of a C.

Dendroclones might be unique to extinct sponges and are branching spicules that may take irregular forms, or may form structures with an I, Y or X shape.

- Megascleres are large spicules measuring from 60-2000 μm and often function as the main support elements in the skeleton.
  - Acanthostyles are spiny styles.
  - Anatriaenes, orthotriaenes and protriaenes are triaenes - megascleres with one long and three short rays.
  - Strongyles are megascleres with both ends blunt or rounded.
  - Styles are megascleres with one end pointed and the other end rounded.
  - Tornotes are megascleres with spear shaped ends.
  - Tylotes are megascleres with knobs on both ends.
- Microscleres are small spicules measuring from 10-60 μm and are scattered throughout the tissue and are not part of the main support element.
  - Chelae are microscleres with shovel-like structures on the ends. Anisochelas are microscleres with dissimilar ends. Isochelas are microscleres with two similar ends.
  - Euasters are star-shaped microscleres with multiple rays radiating from a common centre. Examples are oxyasters (euasters with pointed rays) or sterrasters (ball-shaped euasters).
  - Forceps are microscleres bent back on themselves.
  - Microstrongyles are small rods with both ends blunt or rounded.
  - Microxeas are small rods with both ends pointed.
  - Sigmas are C- or S-shaped microscleres.

=== Calcareous spicules ===
Animal biomineralization is a controlled process and leads to the production of mineral–organic composite materials that considerably differ in shape and material properties from their purely inorganic counterparts. The ability to form functional biominerals, such as endoskeletons and exoskeletons, protective shells, or teeth, had been a significant step in animal evolution. Calcium carbonate biomineralization, the most widespread type among animal phyla, evolved several times independently, resulting in multiple recruitments of the same genes for biomineralization in different lineages.

Among these genes, members of the alpha carbonic anhydrase gene family (CAs) are essential for biomineralization. CAs are zinc-binding enzymes that catalyze the reversible conversion of carbon dioxide and water to bicarbonate and one proton. The zinc-binding is mediated by three histidine residues essential for the protein's catalytic function. CAs are involved in many physiological processes requiring ion regulation or carbon transport, both of which are crucial for the controlled precipitation of carbonate biominerals. In mammals, where they are best studied, 16 different CAs are expressed in specific tissues and active in defined subcellular compartments. Cytosolic, mitochondrial, membrane-bound, and secreted CA forms can be distinguished, and these groups got expanded and reduced in different animal groups. Specific CAs are involved in the carbonate biomineralization in distinct animal lineages, including sponges.

Among extant sponges, only the calcareous sponges can produce calcite spicules, whereas other classes' spicules are siliceous. Some lineages among demosponges and a few calcareans have massive calcium carbonate basal skeletons, the so-called coralline sponges or sclerosponges. The biomineralizing CAs used by carbonate-producing demosponges are not orthologous to the CAs involved in the spicule formation of calcareous sponges, suggesting that the two biomineralization types evolved independently. This observation agrees with the idea that the formation of calcitic spicules is an evolutionary innovation of calcareous sponges.

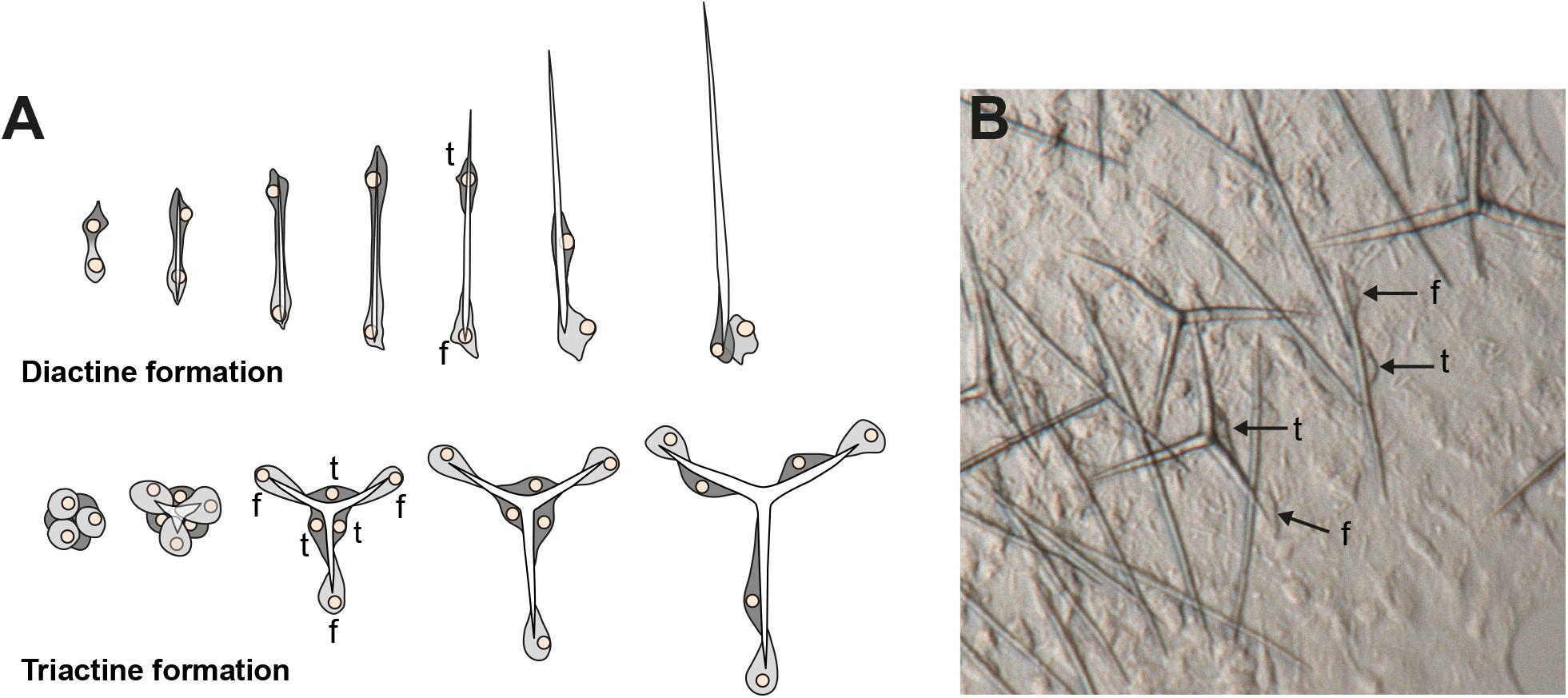
Spicule formation by sclerocytes in calcareous sponges (A) Movement of founder cell (f) and thickener (t) cells during diactine and triactine formation; (B) in vivo formation of spicules by sclerocytes (f = founder cell, t = thickener cell). Modified from Voigt et al. (2017).

Spicules are formed by sclerocytes, which are derived from archaeocytes. The sclerocyte begins with an organic filament, and adds silica to it. Spicules are generally elongated at a rate of 1-10 μm per hour. Once the spicule reaches a certain length it protrudes from the sclerocyte cell body, but remains within the cell's membrane. On occasion, sclerocytes may begin a second spicule while the first is still in progress.

The shapes of calcareous sponge spicules are simple compared with the sometimes very elaborate siliceous spicules found in the other sponge classes. With only a few exceptions, calcareous sponge spicules can be of three basic types: monaxonic, two-tipped diactines, triactines with three spicules rays, and four-rayed tetractines. Specialized cells, the sclerocytes, produce these spicules, and only a few sclerocytes interact in the formation of one specific spicule: Two sclerocytes produce a diactine, six sclerocytes form a triactine, and seven a tetractines. A pair of sclerocytes is involved in the growth of each actine of these spicules. After an initial phase, the so-called founder cell promotes actine elongation, the second, so-called thickener cell in some, but not all species deposit additional calcium carbonate on the actine, as it migrates back toward the founder cell. Calcareous sponges can possess only one or any combination of the three spicule types in their body, and in many cases, certain spicule types are restricted to specific body parts. This indicates that spicule formation is under strict genetic control in calcareous sponges, and specific CAs play an essential role in this genetic control

=== Siliceous spicules ===
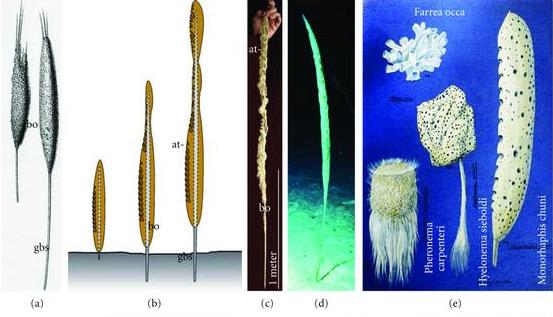
Shown right: Glass sponges (hexactinellids) may live 15,000 years. Shown left: The largest biosilica structure on Earth is the giant basal spicule from the deep-sea glass sponge Monorhaphis chuni.

The largest biosilica structure on Earth is the giant basal spicule from the deep-sea glass sponge Monorhaphis chuni. The diagram on the right shows:

(a) Young specimens of M. chuni anchored to the muddy substratum by one single giant basal spicule (gbs). The body (bo) surrounds the spicule as a continuous, round cylinder.
(b) The growth phases of the sessile animal with its GBS (gbs) which anchors it to the substratum and holds the surrounding soft body (bo). The characteristic habitus displays linearly arranged large atrial openings (at) of approximately 2 cm in diameter. With growth, the soft body dies off in the basal region and exposes the bare GBS (a to c).
(c) Part of the body (bo) with its atrial openings (at). The body surface is interspersed with ingestion openings allowing a continuous water flow though canals in the interior which open into oscules that are centralized in atrial openings, the sieve-plates.
(d) M. chuni in its natural soft bottom habitat of bathyal slopes off New Caledonia. The specimens live at a depth of 800–1,000 m [23]. In this region, the sponge occurs at a population density of 1-2 individuals per m^{2}. The animals reach sizes of around 1 m in length.
(e) Drawings of different glass sponges (hexactinellids).

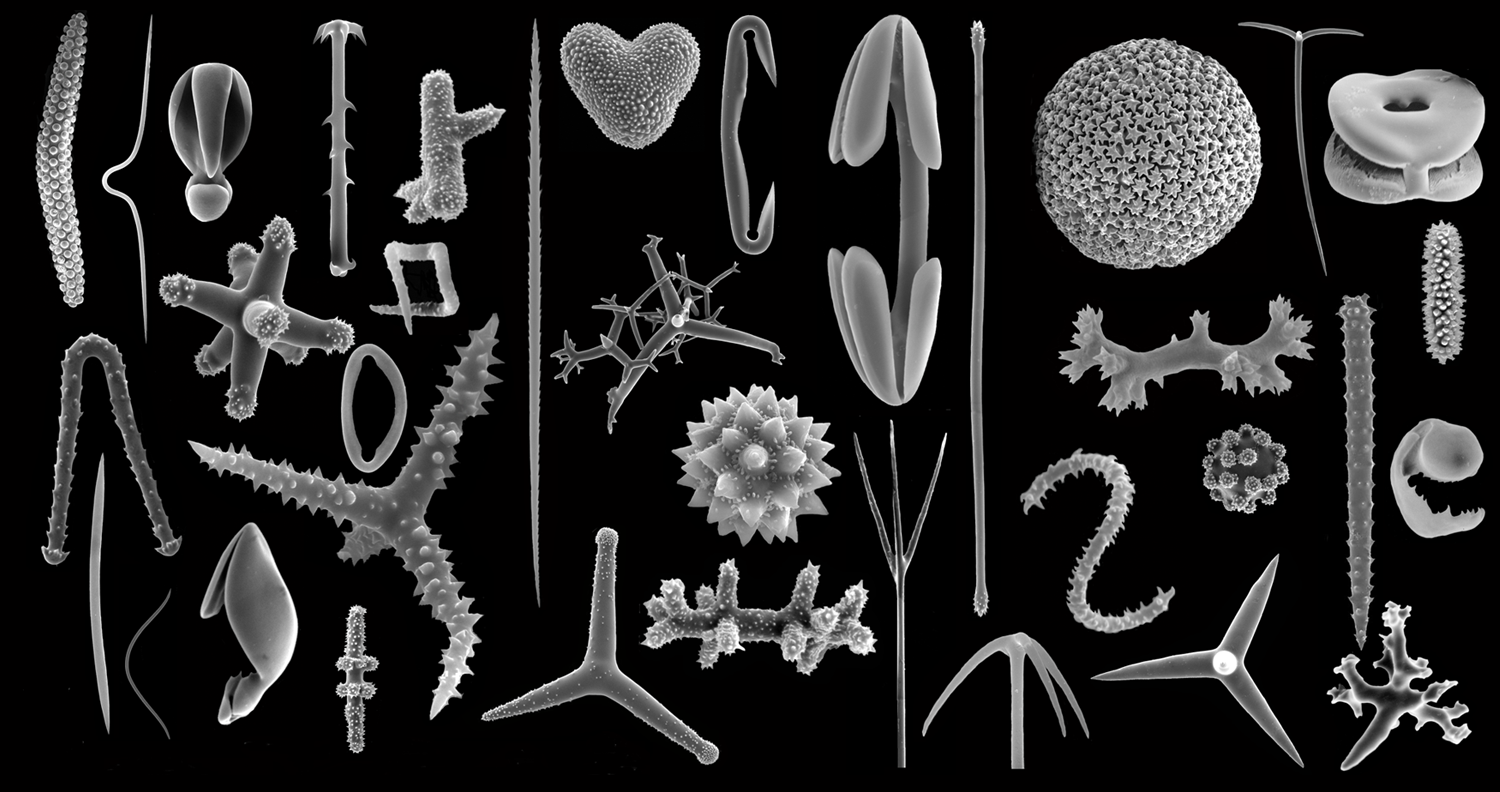
Selection of microscleres and megascleres of demosponges Not to scale — sizes vary between 0.01 and 1 mm

Spicules belonging to the Geodiidae are called "sterrasters"

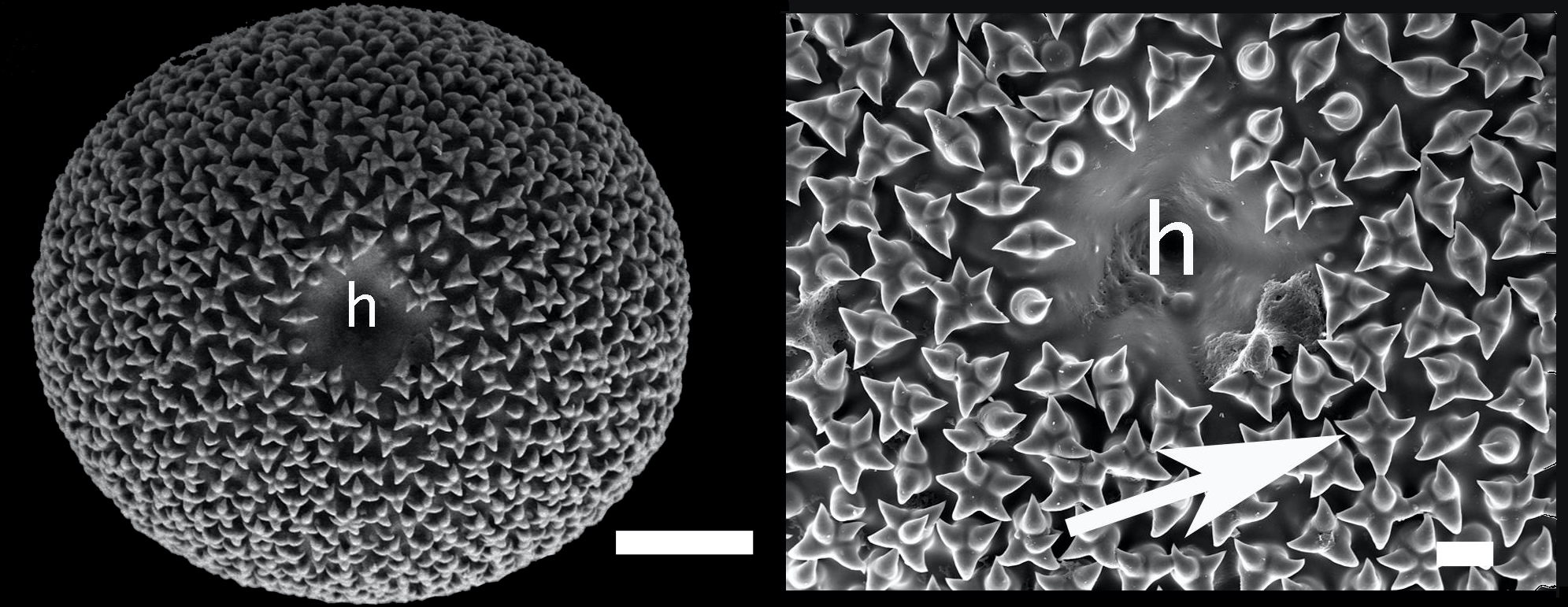
Sterraster with smooth rosettes
Geodia atlantica; (h) is the hilum; the arrow points to a smooth rosette made up of rays. Left scale 20 μm, right scale 2 μm.

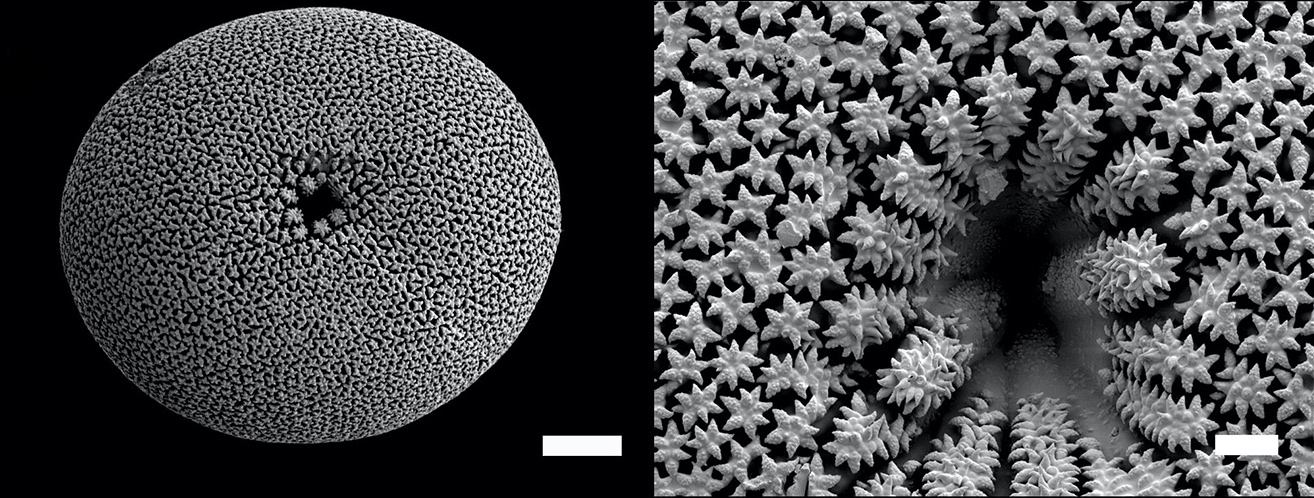
Sterraster with warty rosettes
Geodia macandrewii, left scale 50 μm, right scale 2 μm

Siliceous spicules in demosponges exist in a variety of shapes, some of which look like minute spheres of glass. They are called sterrasters when they belong to the Geodiidae family and selenasters when they belong to the Placospongiidae family.

Siliceous spicules were first described and illustrated in 1753 by Vitaliano Donati, who found them in the species Geodia cydonium from the Adriatic Sea: he called these spicules "little balls". They are later called globular crystalloids, globate spicules, or globostellates by sponge taxonomists, until 1888 when William Sollas finally coins the term "sterraster" from the Greek sterros meaning "solid" or "firm" – see diagram on the right. Meanwhile, similar ball-shaped spicules are observed in another genus, Placospongia, and these are at first considered as "sterrasters" before Richard Hanitsch coins the term "selenaster" in 1895 for these different spicules (coming from the Greek selene for "moon", referring to the "half-moon" shape). Finally, an additional term "aspidaster" is created by von Lendenfeld in 1910, convinced that the flattened sterrasters in the genus Erylus are significantly different from those in Geodia.

Today, the Geodiidae represent a highly diverse sponge family with more than 340 species, occurring in shallow to deep waters worldwide apart from the Antarctic. Sterrasters/aspidaster spicules are currently the main synapomorphy of the Geodiidae. The family currently includes five genera with sterrasters and several others that have secondarily lost their sterrasters. The Geodia can be massive animals more than a meter across.

Selenasters are the main synapomorphy of Placospongia (family Placospongiidae, order Clionaida), a well-supported monophyletic genus from shallow temperate/tropical waters worldwide. It is not a very diverse genus with only 10 species currently described (WPD) and a handful of undescribed species. Placospongia species are usually small, encrusting, and never occur in high densities.

Sterrasters/selenasters are big enough to examine in some detail their surfaces with an optical microscope. However, the use of the scanning electron microscope (SEM) enabled a significantly better understanding of the surface microornamentations. A few descriptive terms have also appeared to describe and compare in greater detail the microornamentations of these ball-shaped spicules. polyaxial spicules such as the sterrasters and aspidasters, are the result of fused "actines" (= branches of asters, from the Greek for "star"), later covered with "rosettes" made of different "rays". The "hilum" (Latin for a "little thing" or "trifle" or the "eye of a bean") is a small area without rosettes or any kind of surface pattern. There are no particular terms to describe the surface of selenasters, except for the "hilum", also present. Although there appears to be no significant variation in the size of the rosettes and hilum between species, noticed that rosettes could be smooth or warty and hypothesized that this character could be of phylogenetic value if studied more broadly. Furthermore, the rosette morphology also seemed to be variable between Geodia, Pachymatisma, and Caminella which suggests that a more detailed study of the sterraster/aspidaster surface would potentially bring new characters for Geodiidae genera identification.

== Spicule "life cycle" ==
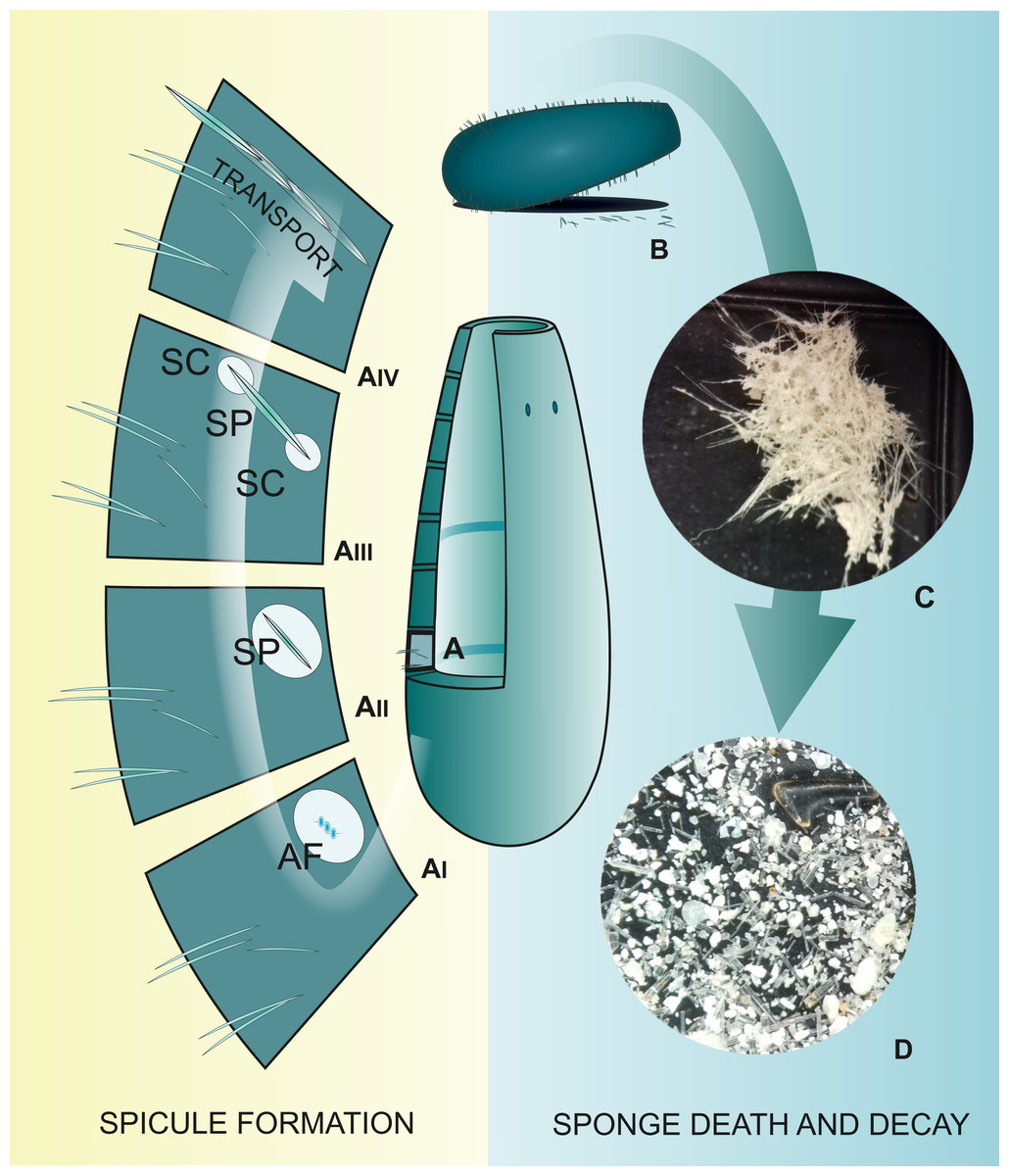
Spicule "life cycle" (A) Spicule development in the mesohyl; (AI) Formation of spicule axial filament (AF); (AII) Spicule (SP) growth within the sclerocyte; (AIII) Spicule growth with two sclerocytes (SC) on spicule tips; (AIV) Transport of mature spicule within the sponge body; (B) Sponge death and body decay; (C) Detached sponge fragment with spicules; (D) Disassociated spicules. (C and D)

From formation to deposition

The formation of spicules is controlled genetically. In most cases, the first growth phase is intracellular; it starts in sclerocytes (amoeboid cells responsible for spicule formation) in mesohyl and is mediated by silicatein, a special enzyme that initiates formation of the axial filament (harboured by the axial canal) which provides the vertical axis of the spicule. The axial canal is filled with organic proteinaceous material which usually extends to the tip of the newly-formed spicule. The cross-section of the axial canal differs across major sponge clades that produce siliceous spicules (it is triangular in demosponges, irregular in homoscleromorphs and quadrangular in hexactinellids. In calcareans (producing calcareous spicules) the axial canal is not developed. The geometry and the length of the axial filament determines the shape of the spicule. In desmoid spicules of 'lithistids' (an informal group of demosponges with articulated skeletons), however, the axial filament is shorter than the spicule arms and it is possible that only organic molecules are involved in the spicule-forming process.

During formation of the siliceous spicules (Calcarea displays different mechanisms of spicule biomineralization), sponges obtain silicon in the form of soluble silicic acid and deposit it around the axial filament, within a special membrane called silicalemma. Silica is first laid out as small 2 μm granules that are fused to bigger spheres (or fused together within process of biosintering in Hexactinellida. After some time, amorphous silica is added, forming evenly-deposited concentric layers, separated from each other by ultrathin organic interlayers. At this stage, immature spicules are secreted from the sclerocyte and covered by pseudopodia of one to several cells, and the process of silica deposition and spicule growth continues.

After completing the deposition of silica (or during this phase), the spicule is transported to the right place in the sponge body by crawling mesohyl cells, where spongocytes secrete spongin fibrils around them and connect them with adjacent spicules. In some hexactinellids, that are characterized by rigid skeleton, the fusion of spicules appears to occur parallel to spicule secretion.

When sponges are alive, their spicules provide a structural "framework". Following their death, the body and the skeleton structure, especially that of demosponges in which the spicules are connected to each other only by perishable collagen fibres, rapidly disintegrate leaving the spicules "free". Because of this, sponges are rarely wholly preserved in the fossil record. Their spicules, however, are incorporated into sediments, often becoming one of the main components of sedimentary rocks. Sometimes spicules accumulate into enormous agglomerations called spicule mats or beds. These accumulations are characteristic for polar waters. Spicules can fossilize to form special type of rocks called the spiculites ("spongillites" for freshwater sponge spicules); these types of rocks are known globally, and have been formed through the whole Phanerozoic. Biosiliceous sedimentation occasionally results in the formation of spiculitic cherts (in so called glass ramps) which are recorded from the Permian to Eocene of many parts of the world.

== Locomotion ==
In 2016 a newly discovered demosponge community living under arctic ice were found to have moved across the sea floor by extending their spicules and then retracting their body in the direction of motion.

== Spiculites ==
When dead sponges disintegrate and disarticulate into discrete spicules, the sponge spicules become incorporated into marine sediments. They sometime accumulate as layers (beds) of sediment composed mostly of spicules, called spicule mats or spicule beds. After burial, these beds often lithify to form a special type of sedimentary rock called spiculite.

The record of fossil and subfossil sponge spicules is extraordinarily rich and often serves as a basis for far-reaching reconstructions of sponge communities, though spicules are also bearers of significant ecological and environmental information. Specific requirements and preferences of sponges can be used to interpret the environment in which they lived, and reconstruct oscillations in water depths, pH, temperatures, and other parameters, providing snapshots of past climate conditions. In turn, the silicon isotope compositions in spicules (δ30Si) are being increasingly often used to estimate the level of silicic acid in the marine settings throughout the geological history, which enables the reconstruction of past silica cycle and ocean circulation.

Spicules provide structural support for maintaining the vertical body position, minimize the metabolic cost of water exchange, and may even deter predators. They often develop in different sizes and a wide variety of three dimensional shapes, with many being unique to clade- or even species-level taxa. Demosponges are characterized by spicules of monaxonic or tetraxonic symmetry. Hexactinellids produce spicules of hexactinic or triaxonic (cubic) symmetry or shapes that are clearly derived from such morpohologies. The spicules of homoscleromorphs represent peculiar tetractines (calthrops) and their derivatives that originate through reduction or ramification of the clads. Spicules of Calcarea are produced in three basic forms: diactines, triactines and tetractines.

The mineral composition of sponge spicules makes these structures the most resistant parts of the sponge bodies and ensures the ability of spicules to withstand various taphonomic processes, resulting in that they often constitute the only evidence of the presence of some sponges in an ecosystem. Even though sponges are often known from rich assemblages of bodily-preserved specimens, a significant part of their fossil and subfossil record is also represented by their spicules. Having that in mind, spicules can be of crucial importance for reconstructions of extinct or cryptic (hiding in cervices and caves) sponge communities; and, indeed, they have been investigated especially with respect to their taxonomic significance. The morphologies of spicules and their arrangement, together with other important sponge features, such as the shape, consistency, and color, are essential when identifying sponges.

In contrast to whole-bodied sponge fossils, spicules are common in many depositional environments. Their significance, however, is often underestimated, which is mostly due to the difficulties in assigning disassociated spicules to sponge taxa or due to the scarcity of the material.

== Interaction with light ==
Research on the Euplectella aspergillum (Venus' Flower Basket) demonstrated that the spicules of certain deep-sea sponges have similar traits to Optical fibre. In addition to being able to trap and transport light, these spicules have a number of advantages over commercial fibre optic wire. They are stronger, resist stress easier, and form their own support elements. Also, the low-temperature formation of the spicules, as compared to the high temperature stretching process of commercial fibre optics, allows for the addition of impurities which improve the refractive index. In addition, these spicules have built-in lenses in the ends which gather and focus light in dark conditions. It has been theorized that this ability may function as a light source for symbiotic algae (as with Rosella racovitzae) or as an attractor for shrimp which live inside the Venus' Flower Basket. However, a conclusive decision has not been reached; it may be that the light capabilities are simply a coincidental trait from a purely structural element. Spicules funnel light deep inside sea sponges.

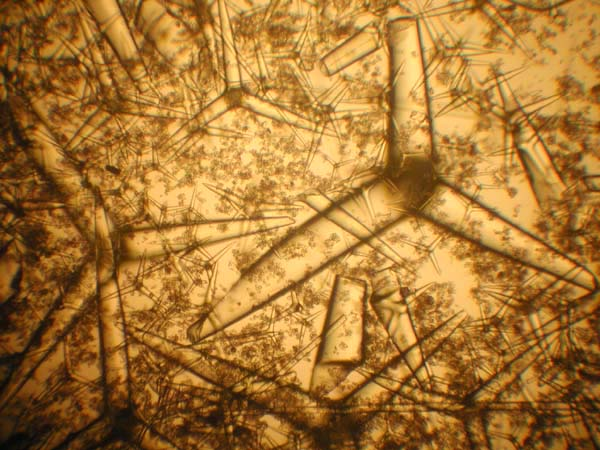
Sponge spicules

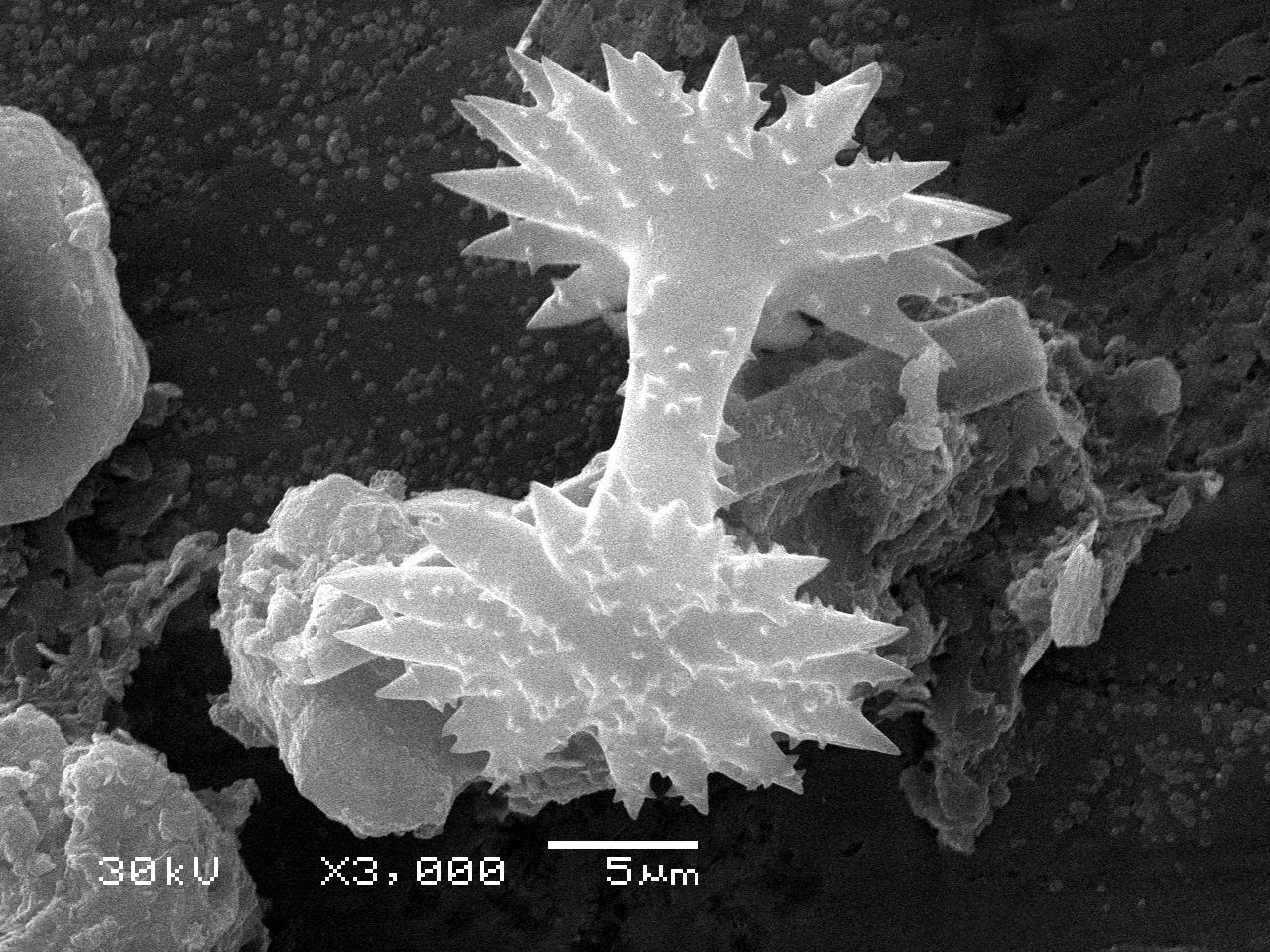
Spicules of sponge (SEM)

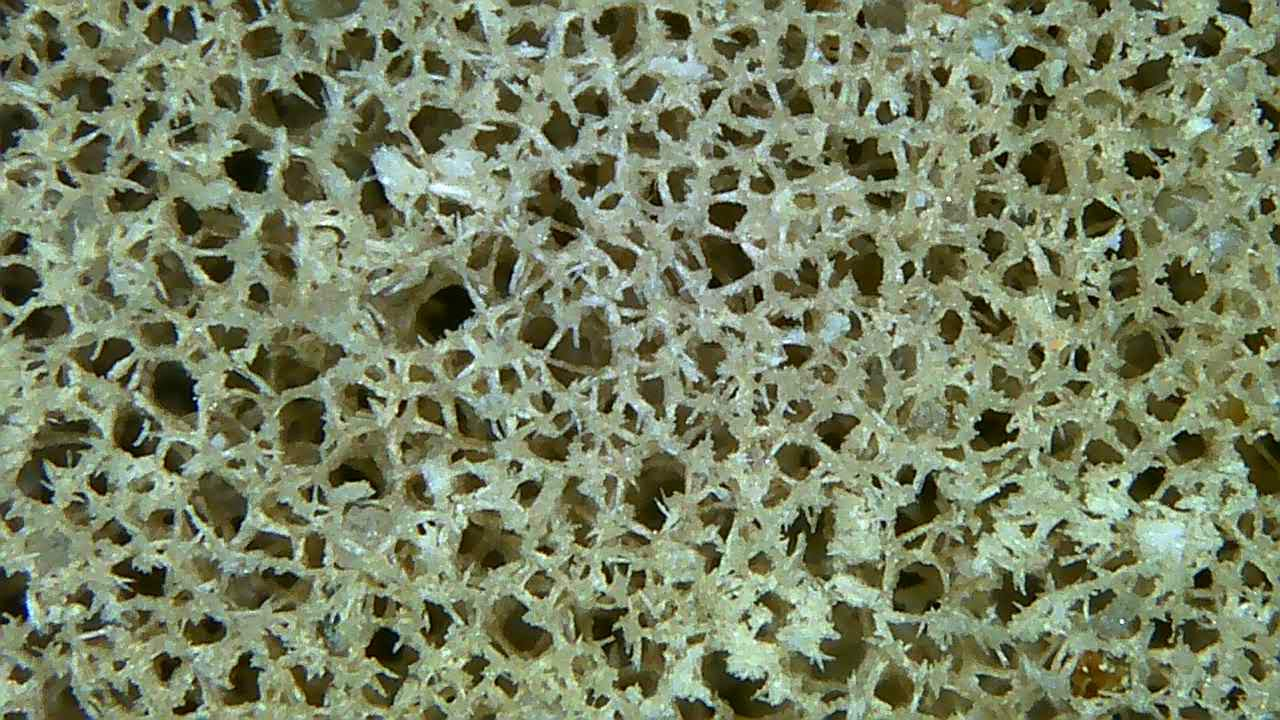
Network of sponge spicules

== See also ==
- Microfossil

== Further references ==
- Shoham, Erez; Prohaska, Thomas; Barkay, Zahava; Zitek, Andreas; Benayahu, Yehuda (2019). "Soft corals form aragonite-precipitated columnar spiculite in mesophotic reefs". Scientific Reports. 9 (1): 1241. Bibcode:2019NatSR...9.1241S. doi:10.1038/s41598-018-37696-z. PMC 6362064. PMID 30718658.
