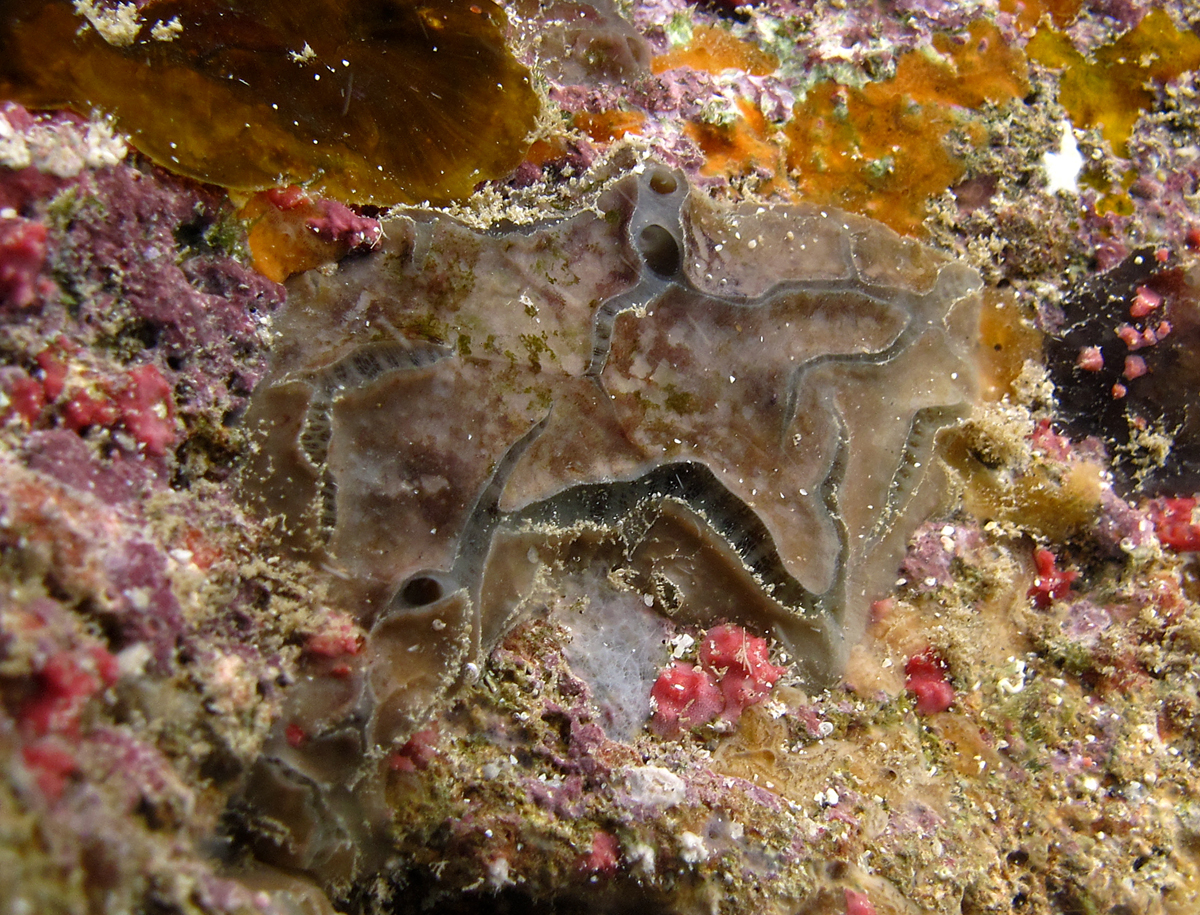

Scientific classification
- Domain: Eukaryota
- Kingdom: Animalia
- Phylum: Porifera
- Class: Demospongiae
- Order: Clionaida
- Family: Placospongiidae

= Placospongiidae =

Family of sponges

Placospongiidae is a family of sponges belonging to the order Clionaida.

Genera:

- Onotoa Laubenfels, 1955
- Placospherastra van Soest, 2009
- Placospongia Gray, 1867
