= List of ethnobotanists =

This is a list of ethnobotanists.

- Isabella Abbott
- Robert Bye
- Michael Jeffrey Balick
- Frank C. Cook IV
- Paul Alan Cox
- Wade Davis
- James A. Duke
- Nina Etkin
- Maria Fadiman
- Norman Farnsworth
- Erna Gunther
- Kathleen Harrison
- John William Harshberger
- Charles Bixler Heiser
- Dennis McKenna
- Terence McKenna
- Gary Paul Nabhan
- Jonathan Ott
- Keewaydinoquay Peschel
- Luigi Piacenza
- Andrea Pieroni
- Mark Plotkin
- Timothy Plowman
- Cassandra L. Quave
- Jan Salick
- Giorgio Samorini
- Richard Evans Schultes
- Merlin Sheldrake
- Daniel Siebert
- Constantino Manuel Torres
- Nancy Turner
- Ina Vandebroek
- Gustav Vilbaste
- R. Gordon Wasson
- Ulrich Willerding
- Arthur Whistler
- James Wong
- Douglas E. Yen

== See also ==
- Ethnobotany
