= Brian M. Boom =

American botanist

Brian Morey Boom (born 24 February 1954) is an American botanist who specializes in the flora of the Guianas and the Caribbean, the family Rubiaceae, ethnobotany, and economic botany.

== Biography ==
At the University of Memphis he graduated in 1977 with a B.S. in biology and in 1979 with an M.S. in botany. At the Graduate Center of the City University of New York he graduated with a Ph.D. in 1983 with dissertation A Revision of Isertia (Isertieae: Rubiaceae). His doctoral advisor was Scott A. Mori.

From 1972 to 1977 Boom worked at the Memphis Museum. From 1977 and 1979 he worked as a research assistant in the University of Tennessee's department of botany. Since 1980 he has worked in various positions at the New York Botanical Garden. There he is, since 2012, the Bassett Maguire Curator of Botany and, since 2014, the director of the New York Botanical Garden Press. On leaves of absence from the New York Botanical Garden, he has held various temporary appointments, including president of the All Species Foundation in 2001 and associate director for research at Columbia University's Center for Environmental Research and Conservation (CERC) from 2002 to 2004.

In addition to these positions, Boom has held appointments at universities. From 1988 to 1990 he was an adjunct assistant professor in the biology department of Lehman College (City University of New York). In the same years, he was also a visiting fellow at the Instituto Nacional de Pesquisas da Amazônia (INPA) in Manaus (Brazil). At Yale University's School of Forestry and Environmental Studies he was from 1986 to 1992 a guest lecturer in the tropical sciences and from 1992 to 1996 an adjunct associate professor in tropical dendrology. From 1995 to 2002 he was a visiting professor in the biology department of New York University. Since 1995, he has been an assistant senior researcher at the Center for Environmental Research and Conservation (CERC) at Columbia University.

Boom is a member of the American Association for the Advancement of Science, the American Public Gardens Association, the American Society of Plant Taxonomists, the Botanical Society of America, the International Association for Plant Taxonomy, the National Geographic Society (lifetime member), the Society for Economic Botany (as president from 2001 to 2002), the Torrey Botanical Society (chair from 2007 to 2011), and the Linnean Society of London. He is also involved in the Organization for Flora Neotropica.

Boom has done field work in United States, Mexico, Brazil, Ecuador, French Guiana, Guyana, Bolivia, Puerto Rico, Dominican Republic, and Venezuela. He led ecotours for the board of the New York Botanical Garden to Ecuador in 1992, to Brazil in 1993, 1999, and 2009, to Puerto Rico in 1994, to Costa Rica in 2004, to Chile in 2005, and to Cuba in 2012 (3 trips).

He has done research on systematic botany, economic botany, biodiversity inventory in tropical forests, and the relationships between plants and people living in neotropical forests. His research deals with various plant groups, including the plant families Isoetaceae, Gentianaceae, Theaceae and in particular Rubiaceae. Within the family Rubiaceae his research focuses on the genus Isertia (of which he has performed a taxonomic revision) and on floristic research of this plant family at research sites in the Brazilian Amazon and French Guiana. He has also made various species descriptions of new species within this family.

Boom participated in inventories of trees in Brazil, Ecuador, French Guiana, Guyana, Bolivia, Puerto Rico, and Venezuela. He has mapped the use of plants by the Chácobo in the Bolivian Amazon and by the Panare of the Venezuelan Amazon. He also leads efforts to conserve ash trees (genus Fraxinus) in the northeastern United States. He is also involved in botanical research and nature conservation in the Caribbean. He is director of the Caribbean Biodiversity Program, a project of the New York Botanical Garden that aims to map and protect the plants and fungi of the Caribbean.

Boom is the author or coauthor of articles in Annals of the Missouri Botanical Garden, Brittonia, Economic Botany, Nature, and Systematic Botany. Peperomia boomii, named by Julian Alfred Steyermark in honor of Boom, is a synonym of Peperomia lanceolata.

In 1998 in Costa Rica, Brian Boom married Karen Ruth Dressner.

== Selected publications ==
- Boom, Brian M. (1980). "Intersectional Hybrids in Isoëtes". American Fern Journal. 70 (1): 1–4. Bibcode:1980AmFJ...70....1B. doi:10.2307/1546200. JSTOR 1546200.
- Boom, Brian M. (1981). "The Ladew Expedition to Bolivia and Peru: George Tate's Botanical Collections". Brittonia. 33 (3): 482–489. Bibcode:1981Britt..33..482B. doi:10.2307/2806444. JSTOR 2806444. S2CID 86614703. (See George Henry Hamilton Tate.)
- Mori, Scott A.; Boom, Brian M.; Prance, Ghillean T. (1981). "Distribution Patterns and Conservation of Eastern Brazilian Coastal Forest Tree Species". Brittonia. 33 (2): 233. Bibcode:1981Britt..33..233M. doi:10.2307/2806330. JSTOR 2806330. S2CID 85238627.
- Boom, Brian M. (1982). "Synopsis of Isoëtes in the Southeastern United States". Castanea. 47 (1): 38–59. JSTOR 4033213.
- Boom, Brian M.; Mori, Scott A. (1982). "Falsification of Two Hypotheses on Liana Exclusion from Tropical Trees Possessing Buttresses and Smooth Bark". Bulletin of the Torrey Botanical Club. 109 (4): 447. doi:10.2307/2996485. JSTOR 2996485.
- Mori, Scott A.; Boom, Brian M.; De Carvalho, André M.; Dos Santos, Talmón S. (1983). "Southern Bahian moist forests". The Botanical Review. 49 (2): 155–232. Bibcode:1983BotRv..49..155M. doi:10.1007/BF02861011. S2CID 39878879.
- Boom, Brian M. (1986). "A Forest Inventory in Amazonian Bolivia". Biotropica. 18 (4): 287–294. Bibcode:1986Biotr..18..287B. doi:10.2307/2388571. JSTOR 2388571.
- Boom, Brian M. (1985). "Ethnopteridology of the Chácobo Indians in Amazonian Bolivia". American Fern Journal. 75 (1): 19–21. Bibcode:1985AmFJ...75...19B. doi:10.2307/1546576. JSTOR 1546576.
- Boom, Brian M. (1986). "A Forest Inventory in Amazonian Bolivia". Biotropica. 18 (4): 287–294. Bibcode:1986Biotr..18..287B. doi:10.2307/2388571. JSTOR 2388571.
- Prance, G. T.; Balée, W.; Boom, B. M.; Carneiro, R. L. (1987). "Quantitative Ethnobotany and the Case for Conservation in Amazonia". Conservation Biology. 1 (4): 296–310. Bibcode:1987ConBi...1..296P. doi:10.1111/j.1523-1739.1987.tb00050.x. ISSN 0888-8892.
- Boom, Brian M. (1988). "The Chácobo Indians and Their Palms". Advances in Economic Botany. 6: 91–97. JSTOR 43927521.
- Boom, Brian M. (1989). "Use of Plant Resources by the Chácobo". Advances in Economic Botany. 7: 78–96. JSTOR 43927546.
- Boom, Brian M. (1989). "New Species of Ternstroemia (Theaceae) from the Guayana Highland". Brittonia. 41 (2): 136–142. Bibcode:1989Britt..41..136B. doi:10.2307/2807518. JSTOR 2807518. S2CID 42289418.
- Boom, Brian M. (1990). "Useful Plants of the Panare Indians of the Venezuelan Guayana". Advances in Economic Botany. 8: 57–76. JSTOR 43927567.
- Boom, Brian M. (1996). "Ethnobotany of the Chácobo Indians, Beni, Bolivia: Second Edition". Advances in Economic Botany. 4: 1–74. JSTOR 43931377.
- Boom, Brian M.; Moestl, Sylvia (1990). "Ethnobotanical Notes of José M. Cruxent from the Franco-Venezuelan Expedition to the Headwaters of the Orinoco River, 1951-1952". Economic Botany. 44 (3): 416–419. Bibcode:1990EcBot..44..416B. doi:10.1007/BF03351035. JSTOR 4255262. S2CID 37074819. (See José Cruxent.)
- Boom, Brian M. (1996). "One hundred years of botanical research and scholarly publishing at the New York Botanical Garden. An introduction to the historical issue of Brittonia". Brittonia. 48 (3): 281–284. Bibcode:1996Britt..48..281B. doi:10.1007/BF02805286. S2CID 26392540.
- Wheeler, Q. D.; Knapp, S.; Stevenson, D. W.; Stevenson, J.; Blum, S. D.; Boom, B. M.; Borisy, G. G.; Buizer, J. L.; De Carvalho, M. R.; Cibrian, A.; Donoghue, M. J.; Doyle, V.; Gerson, E. M.; Graham, C. H.; Graves, P.; Graves, S. J.; Guralnick, R. P.; Hamilton, A. L.; Hanken, J.; Law, W.; Lipscomb, D. L.; Lovejoy, T. E.; Miller, H.; Miller, J. S.; Naeem, S.; Novacek, M. J.; Page, L. M.; Platnick, N. I.; Porter-Morgan, H.; et al. (2012). "Mapping the biosphere: Exploring species to understand the origin, organization and sustainability of biodiversity". Systematics and Biodiversity. 10 (1): 1–20. Bibcode:2012SyBio..10....1W. doi:10.1080/14772000.2012.665095. hdl:1912/5119. S2CID 5658979.
