= Djaja Soejarto =

Indonesian-born botanist (born 1939)

Djaja D. Soejarto
- Born: August 17, 1939 (age 87); Indonesia
- Occupations: Botanist, ethnobotanist, pharmacognosist, academic and author
- Awards: Distinguished Economic Botanist, Society for Economic Botany (2012); Norman Farnsworth Excellence in Botanical Research Award, American Botanical Council (2012); Tyler Prize Award, American Society of Pharmacognosy (2022)

Academic background
- Education: BSc; M.A., Biology; PhD, Biology
- Alma mater: College of Agriculture, Tjiawi, Bogor, Indonesia; Harvard University

Djaja D. Soejarto is an Indonesian-born botanist, ethnobotanist, pharmacognosist, academic and author. He is an adjunct curator at the Field Museum of Natural History as well as professor emeritus in the Department of Pharmaceutical Sciences and at the Pharmacognosy Institute of the College of Pharmacy, the University of Illinois at Chicago.

Soejarto is most known for his works on medicinal plants of Southeast Asia. His works have been published in academic journals, including Economic Botany and Journal of Natural Products, as well as books such as Ethnobotany of Tuberculosis in Laos and Medicinal Plants of Laos. He is the recipient of the 2022 Tyler Prize Award from the American Society of Pharmacognosy.

Soejarto was the editor of the Journal of Ethnopharmacology.

== Education ==
Soejarto completed his BSc from the College of Agriculture in Java in 1962, followed by an M.A. in biology from Harvard University. In 1969, he obtained a PhD in biology from the same institution.

== Career ==
Soejarto joined the University of Antioquia in 1971, where he undertook various roles, serving as an assistant professor in the Department of Biology from 1971 to 1973 and subsequently as an associate professor in the same department from 1973 to 1976. Between 1979 and 1983, he served as an adjunct associate professor of pharmacognosy in the Department of Pharmacognosy and Pharmacology, College of Pharmacy at the University of Illinois at Chicago. At the University of Illinois Chicago, he held multiple positions, including an appointment as an associate professor in the Department of Medicinal Chemistry and Pharmacognosy and Program for Collaborative Research in the Pharmaceutical Sciences from 1983 to 1989. From 1989 to 2014, he held the position of professor of pharmacognosy. Concurrently, he held the position of an affiliate professor of biology at the same institution from 1990 to 1995. Since 2015, he has held the position of professor emeritus in the Department of Pharmaceutical Sciences and Program for Collaborative Research in the Pharmaceutical Sciences at the University of Illinois at Chicago.

Soejarto founded the Herbarium of the University of Antioquia in Medellin, Colombia, serving as its director from 1969 to 1976. Between 1991 and 1997, he held an honorary appointment as a researcher in the National Museum, Manila. Apart from this, he served in consulting roles at the Chinese Traditional Medicine Division of the Hong Kong Department of Health from 2009 to 2017. Since 2013, he has served as an adjunct curator in Science and Education at the Field Museum of Natural History. Furthermore, in collaboration with his chemistry colleagues, he has conducted fieldwork that led to the discovery of new drug lead compounds from plants he collected, primarily in Vietnam and Laos.

== Works ==
Soejarto has authored books throughout his research career. In his book titled Ethnobotany of Tuberculosis in Laos, he explored traditional healing practices in Laos, presenting previously unpublished photographs of medicinal plants from the region. The book also provided a comprehensive account of newly isolated medically interesting compounds from the genus Marsypopetalum (Annonaceae), marking the first documentation of such compounds from this genus.

== Research ==
Focusing on endangered or threatened plant species growing in the United States, Soejarto's 1985 study projected the extinction of 2,067 valuable medicinal plants by 2000, estimating their collective value at $3.248 billion. The research also underscored the necessity of safeguarding these plants to secure the future availability of essential prescription drugs. In the same year, he explored the use of locally available plants or plant extracts for primary health care by presenting a list of plant-derived drugs their sources, and therapeutic uses, aiming to identify alternatives to pharmaceutical preparations. His 1995 collaborative study with JT Baker and others discussed the shift in attitudes towards global genetic resources, emphasizing the importance of conserving these resources and indigenous knowledge through international collaboration, fair compensation, and the implementation of policies outlined in the United Nations Convention on Biological Diversity. Furthermore, in papers published in 2004 and 2007, he provided a factual model on the equitable sharing of benefits in a north–south bioprospecting endeavor between the University of Illinois at Chicago and the Vietnam Academy of Science and Technology, Hanoi, Vietnam, on the one hand, and the Institute of Traditional Medicine, Ministry of Health, Lao People's Democratic Republic, on the other.

Soejarto has also worked in the identification of tropical plant materials for research in developing anticancer and anti-HIV drugs. His research has contributed to the discovery and subsequent advancement of bioactive molecules. Notably, he identified the source plant of the anti-HIV active lead compounds calanolides A and B from Calophyllum lanigerum and C. teysmannii (Clusiaceae) in Sarawak, Malaysia, as well as anticancer active lead compounds phyllanthusmins C and D from Phyllanthus poilanei (Euphorbiaceae) collected in Vietnam. Additionally, he also investigated the potential sweetening agents of plant origin. In one of his studies, he explored the organoleptic qualities of 184 Stevia leaf samples, highlighting that a 62-year-old leaf of S. rebaudiana retained significant and lasting sweetness through diverse preservation methods. It further identified 18 other species and varieties for potential phytochemical investigation of ent-kaurene glycosides. His 2005 collaborative research with A Koch and others delved into Maasai herbalists' traditional knowledge of malaria treatment, revealing 21 plant species through interviews, with in vitro assays confirming the antiplasmodial efficacy of more than half, highlighting ethnomedical inquiry's potential for antimalarial drug discovery. Furthermore, he previously led the Vietnam-Laos International Cooperative Biodiversity Group (ICBG) project from 1998 to 2012. This research explored and identify novel bioactive compounds from plants in Vietnam and Laos for potential therapeutic applications against HIV/AIDS, cancer, tuberculosis, and malaria.

== Bibliography ==
=== Books ===
- Ethnobotany of Tuberculosis in Laos (2014) ISBN 9783319106557
- Medicinal Plants of Laos (2023) ISBN 9781032077772

=== Selected articles ===
- Soejarto, D. D., Kinghorn, A. D., & Farnsworth, N. R. (1982). Potential sweetening agents of plant origin. III. Organoleptic evaluation of Stevia leaf herbarium samples for sweetness. Journal of natural products, 45(5), 590–599.
- Farnsworth, N. R., Akerele, O., Bingel, A. S., Soejarto, D. D., & Guo, Z. (1985). Medicinal plants in therapy. Bulletin of the world health organization, 63(6), 965.
- Farnsworth, N. R., & Soejarto, D. D. (1985). Potential consequence of plant extinction in the United States on the current and future availability of prescription drugs. Economic botany, 39(3), 231–240.
- Baker, J. T., Borris, R. P., Carté, B., Cordell, G. A., Soejarto, D. D., Cragg, G. M., ... & Tyler, V. E. (1995). Natural product drug discovery and development: new perspectives on international collaboration. Journal of natural products, 58(9), 1325–1357.
- Koch, A., Tamez, P., Pezzuto, J., & Soejarto, D. (2005). Evaluation of plants used for antimalarial treatment by the Maasai of Kenya. Journal of ethnopharmacology, 101(1–3), 95–99.

=== Selected book chapters ===
- Soejarto, D. D. (2001). Ethnobotany of Stevia and Stevia rebaudiana. In Stevia (pp. 40–67). CRC Press.
- Farnsworth, N. R., & Soejarto, D. D. (1991). Global importance of medicinal plants. The conservation of medicinal plants, 26(26), 25–51.
- Soejarto, D. D., Gyllenhaal, C., Tarzian Sorensen, J. A., Fong, H. H. H. S., Xuan, L. T., Binh, L. T., ... & Riley, M. C. (2007). Bioprospecting arrangements: Cooperation between the north and the south. Intellectual Property Management in Health and Agricultural Innovation: A Handbook of Best Practices. MIHR.
