= Ina Vandebroek =

Ethnobotanist

Ina Vandebroek PhD
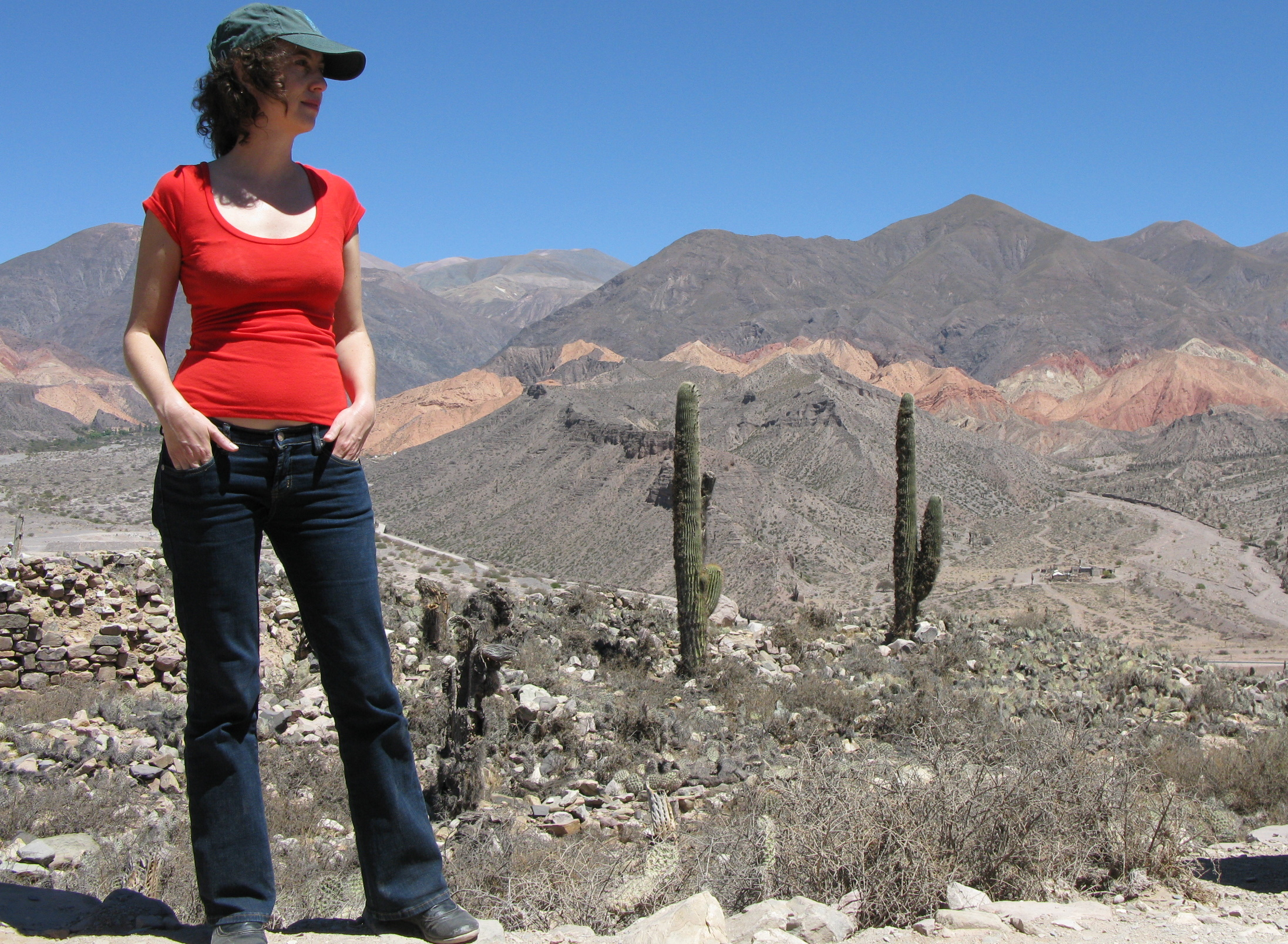
- Ina Vandebroek
- Education: Ghent University
- Scientific career
- Fields: Botany; Ethnobotany; Ethnobiology
- Institutions: The New York Botanical Garden; Yale School of Forestry & Environmental Studies; The Graduate Center, CUNY
- Thesis: Ph.D.: "Research into the neurobiochemical background of captivity-induced stereotyped behavior in the bank vole (Clethrionomys glareolus): ethopharmacology and intra-cerebral microdialysis" (1998)
- Academic advisors: Patrick Van Damme

Ina Vandebroek is an ethnobotanist working in the areas of floristics, ethnobotany and community health. Since 2005, she has worked at the New York Botanical Garden in the Institute of Economic Botany. She has worked on ethnobotanical projects in North America, the Caribbean, and South America.

== Education ==
In 1991, Vandebroek received a BSc. in biology from Ghent University in Belgium with research in the fields of morphology and systematics. Her undergraduate dissertation was on the effects of naloxone and apomorphine on captivity-induced stereotyped behavior in the bank vole (Clethrionomys glareolus). In 1998, she received a Ph.D. in Medical Sciences from Ghent University with a graduate dissertation titled "Research into the neurobiochemical background of captivity-induced stereotyped behavior in the bank vole (Clethrionomys glareolus): ethopharmacology and intra-cerebral microdialysis".

== Career ==
=== Ghent University ===
From 2000 until 2002, Vandebroek worked as a postdoctoral researcher and was the lead researcher on a project funded by the Agency for Innovation by Science and Technology of the Belgian government through Ghent University. The project was based in Bolivia and known as "Medicinal Plant Explorations in the Andes and Amazon Regions of Bolivia Ethnographic and ethnobotanical research was conducted in a traditional farming community in the Andes and in indigenous communities in the Amazon in Bolivia." She summarized the results as follows. "The results demonstrated that knowledge held by traditional healers about medicinal plants can also be high in an environment such as the Andes that is significantly affected by human activity and is less diverse as compared to the tropical rainforest. In the Amazon, knowledge about medicinal plants was inversely related to the use of pharmaceutical products and to distance from Western primary healthcare services." Outreach activities associated with this research project included two community guidebooks in Spanish that were developed to return research results to the communities to help preserve their cultural heritage.

=== The New York Botanical Garden ===
In 2005, Vandebroek joined The New York Botanical Garden as a postdoctoral research associate in the Institute of Economic Botany. From 2005 until 2010 she worked on projects related to the Dominican Republic. Most notably, she directed "Dominican Ethnomedicine and Culturally Effective Health Care in New York City" (principal investigator: Michael Balick) and "Dominican Traditional Medicine for Urban Community Health". These projects focused on the question of what happens to the medicinal plant knowledge that people from the Dominican Republic have once they move to New York City. The research found that medicinal plant knowledge was not lost by this community after migration; in fact, the importance of food as medicine became even greater within this relocated population. Vandebroek drew upon her research during this time for her 2007 book, Traveling Cultures and Plants: The Ethnobiology and Ethnopharmacy of Human Migrations, which she co-edited with Andrea Pieroni and authored chapters with others.

From 2010 until 2014 Vandebroek worked as an Ethnomedical Research Specialist at the New York Botanical Garden. She directed "Improving Healthcare for Underserved Immigrant Latino Communities in New York City," "Cultural Competency Training for Health Care Professionals in Latino Ethnomedical Systems in New York City," "Dominican Ethnomedicine and Culturally Effective Health Care in New York City," and "Dominican Traditional Medicine for Urban Community Health."

From 2014 until the present day, Vandebroek has been the Matthew Calbraith Perry Assistant Curator of Economic Botany and Caribbean Program Director at the New York Botanical Garden. In this capacity, she directs the Caribbean and Latino Ethnomedicine Program, which investigates and compares the use of medicinal plants for healthcare by Latino and Caribbean communities living in New York City and their countries of origin. Dominicans, Puerto Ricans, Mexicans, Jamaicans are the central populations involved in these research studies. She and her team study wild and cultivated plants that are used culturally as medicines and foods, as well as "folk illnesses," and how they are related to mainstream biomedicine, in terms of the biological efficacy and safety of these plants, and the gap in biomedical knowledge about illnesses with a strong cultural component. The project aims to use research results in order to develop materials used for medical education.

She has been interviewed about her work on PBS, WNBC, The Wall Street Journal, The Smithsonian Magazine, National Geographic's The Plate and The New York Times.

== Other work ==
Vandebroek is also a lecturer at the Yale School of Forestry & Environmental Studies and an adjunct member of the City University of New York Biology Doctoral Faculty Plant Sciences Subprogram at (The Graduate Center, CUNY).

Vandebroek is Deputy Editor for the Journal of Ethnobiology and Ethnomedicine, Associate Editor for Economic Botany, and Editorial Board Member for Ethnobiology and Conservation. She has been a council member for professional societies, including the International Society of Ethnobiology from 2008 to 2010, and the Society for Economic Botany from 2010 to 2013.

== Selected publications ==
=== Books ===
- Vandebroek, Ina; Picking, David (2016). Popular Medicinal Plants in Portland and Kingston, Jamaica. Jamaica: Pear Tree Press Limited. ISBN 978-976-8246-97-4. OCLC 976014879.
- Pieroni, Andrea; Vandebroek, Ina, eds. (2007). Traveling Cultures and Plants: The Ethnobiology and Ethnopharmacy of Human Migrations. New York: Berghahn Books. ISBN 978-1-84545-373-2. OCLC 873806266.
- Vandebroek, Ina; Evert, Thomas (2006). Guía de plantas medicinales de los Yuracares y Trinitarios del Territorio Indígena Parque Nacional Isiboro-Sécure, Bolivia (in Spanish). Santa Cruz, Bolivia: Imprenta Sirena. ISBN 978-90-5989-139-5. OCLC 76757416.
- Vandebroek, Ina; Thomas, Evert; Ametrac (2003). Plantas medicinales para la atención primaria de la salud: el conocimiento de ocho médicos tradicionales de Apillapampa (Bolivia) (in Spanish). Cochabamba: Indústrias Gráficas Serrano. ISBN 90-5989-009-4. OCLC 255956635.

=== Selected peer-reviewed journal articles ===
- Ceuterick, Melissa; Vandebroek, Ina (19 January 2017). "Identity in a medicine cabinet: Discursive positions of Andean migrants towards their use of herbal remedies in the United Kingdom" (PDF). Social Science & Medicine. 177: 43–51. doi:10.1016/j.socscimed.2017.01.026. PMID 28157568.
- Sander, Logan; Vandebroek, Ina (2016). "Small-scale farmers as stewards of useful plant diversity: A case study in Portland parish, Jamaica" (PDF). Economic Botany. 70 (303–319): 303–319. doi:10.1007/s12231-016-9354-y. S2CID 43072034.
- Van Andel, Tinde, Hugo J. de Boer, Joanne Barnes & Ina Vandebroek (2014). Medicinal plants used for menstrual disorders in Latin America, the Caribbean, sub-Saharan Africa, South and Southeast Asia and their uterine properties: A review. Journal of Ethnopharmacology 155: 992–1000.
- Vandebroek, Ina & Michael J. Balick (2014) Lime for Chest Congestion, Bitter Orange for Diabetes: Foods as Medicines in the Dominican Community in New York City. Economic Botany 68: 177–189.
- Hanazaki, Natalia, Dannieli Firme Herbst, Mel Simionato Marques & Ina Vandebroek (2013) Evidence of the shifting baseline syndrome in ethnobotanical research. Journal of Ethnobiology and Ethnomedicine 9: 75.
- Vandebroek, Ina (2013) Intercultural health and ethnobotany: How to improve healthcare for underserved and minority communities? Journal of Ethnopharmacology 148: 746–754.
- Van Andel, Tinde, Sylvia Mitchell, Gabriele Volpato, Ina Vandebroek, Jorik Swier, Sofie Ruysschaert, Carlos Ariel Rentería Jiménez & Niels Raas (2012). In search of the perfect aphrodisiac: Parallel use of bitter tonics in West Africa and the Caribbean. Journal of Ethnopharmacology 143: 840–850.
- Henderson, Flor, Ina Vandebroek, Michael J. Balick & Edward J. Kennelly (2012) Ethnobotanical research skills for students of underrepresented minorities in STEM disciplines. Ethnobotany Research & Applications 10: 389–402.
- Mathez-Stiefel, Sarah-Lan, Ina Vandebroek & Stephan Rist (2012) Can Andean medicine coexist with biomedical healthcare? A comparison of two rural communities in Peru and Bolivia. Journal of Ethnobiology and Ethnomedicine 8: 26
- Vandebroek, Ina & Michael J. Balick (2012) Globalization and loss of plant knowledge: Challenging the paradigm. PloS ONE 7: 5
- Mathez-Stiefel, Sarah-Lan & Ina Vandebroek (2012) Distribution and Transmission of Medicinal Plant Knowledge in the Andean Highlands: A Case Study from Peru and Bolivia. Evidence-Based Complementary and Alternative Medicine 2012
- Ceuterick, Melissa, Ina Vandebroek & Andrea Pieroni (2011) Resilience of Andean urban ethnobotanies. A comparison of medicinal plant use among Bolivian and Peruvian migrants in the United Kingdom and in their countries of origin. Journal of Ethnopharmacology 136: 27–54.
- Thomas, Evert, David Douterlungne, Ina Vandebroek, Frieke Heens, Paul Goetghebeur & Patrick Van Damme (2011) Human impact on wild firewood species in the rural Andes community of Apillapampa, Bolivia. Environmental Monitoring and Assessment 178: 333–347.
- Vandebroek, Ina, Victoria Reyes-García, Ulysses Paulino de Albuquerque, Rainer W. Bussmann & Andrea Pieroni (2011) Local knowledge: Who cares? Journal of Ethnobiology and Ethnomedicine 7: 35
- Vandebroek, Ina (2010) The dual intracultural and intercultural relationship between medicinal plant knowledge and consensus. Economic Botany 64: 303–317.
- Vandebroek, Ina, Michael J. Balick, Andreana Ososki, Fredi Kronenberg, Jolene Yukes, Christine Wade, Francisco Jiménez, Brígido Peguero & Daisy Castillo (2010) The importance of botellas and other plant mixtures in Dominican traditional medicine. Journal of Ethnopharmacology 128: 20–41.
- Keller, Amy, Ina Vandebroek, Youping Liu, Michael J. Balick, Fredi Kronenberg, Edward J. Kennelly & Anne-Marie B. Brillantes (2009). Costus spicatus tea failed to improve diabetic progression in C57BLKS/J db/db mice, a model of type 2 diabetes mellitus. Journal of Ethnopharmacology 121: 248–254
- Thomas, Evert, Ina Vandebroek & Patrick Van Damme (2009) Valuation of forests and plant species in Indigenous Territory and National Park Isiboro-Sécure, Bolivia. Economic Botany 63: 229–241.
- Thomas, Evert, Ina Vandebroek, Patrick Van Damme, Lucio Semo & Zacaria Noza (2009) Susto etiology and treatment according to Bolivian Trinitario people: a "masters of the animal species" phenomenon. Medical Anthropology Quarterly 23: 298–319.
- Thomas, Evert, Ina Vandebroek, Patrick Van Damme, Paul Goetghebeur, David Douterlungne, Sabino Sanca & Susana Arrazola (2009) The relation between accessibility, diversity and indigenous valuation of vegetation in the Bolivian Andes. Journal of Arid Environments 73: 854–861.
- Thomas, Evert, Ina Vandebroek, Sabino Sanca & Patrick Van Damme (2009) Cultural significance of medicinal plant families and species among Quechua farmers in Apillapampa, Bolivia. Journal of Ethnopharmacology 122: 60–67.
- Vandebroek, Ina, Evert Thomas, Sabino Sanca, Patrick Van Damme, Luc Van Puyvelde & Norbert De Kimpe (2008) Comparison of health conditions treated with traditional and biomedical healthcare in a Quechua community in rural Bolivia. Journal of Ethnobiology and Ethnomedicine 4:1.
- Ceuterick, Melissa, Ina Vandebroek, Bren Torry & Andrea Pieroni (2008) Cross-cultural adaptation in urban ethnobotany: The Colombian folk pharmacopoeia in London. Journal of Ethnopharmacology 120: 342–359.
- Thomas, Evert, Ina Vandebroek, Patrick Van Damme, Paul Goetghebeur, Sabino Sanca & Susana Arrazola (2008) The Relationship between Plant Use and Plant Diversity in the Bolivian Andes, with Special Reference to Medicinal Plant Use. Human Ecology 36: 861- 861–879
- Thomas, Evert, Ina Vandebroek & Patrick Van Damme (2007). What works in the field? A comparison of different interviewing methods in ethnobotany with special reference to the use of photographs. Economic Botany 61: 376–384.
- Bussmann, Rainer W., Douglas Sharon, Ina Vandebroek, Ana Jones & Zachary Revene (2007). Health for sale: The medicinal plant markets in Trujillo and Chiclayo, Northern Peru. Journal of Ethnobiology and Ethnomedicine 3:37.
- Delanoy, Marleen, Xavier Scheldeman, Ina Vandebroek, Patrick Van Damme & Stephan Beck (2007) Small-scale Cultivation of Passiflora edulis f. flavicarpa and Passiflora ligularis in the Yungas of La Paz, Bolivia. Belgian Journal of Botany 140: 150–160.
- Pieroni, Andrea, Lisa Leimar Price & Ina Vandebroek (2005) Welcome to the Journal of Ethnobiology and Ethnomedicine (Editorial). Journal of Ethnobiology and Ethnomedicine 1:1
- Vandebroek, Ina, Patrick Van Damme, Luc Van Puyvelde, Susana Arrazola & Norbert De Kimpe (2004) A comparison of traditional healers' medicinal plant knowledge in the Bolivian Andes and Amazon. Social Science & Medicine 59: 837–849
- Vandebroek, Ina, Jan-Bart Calewaert, Stijn De Jonckheere, Sabino Sanca, Lucio Semo, Patrick Van Damme, Luc Van Puyvelde & Norbert De Kimpe (2004) Use of medicinal plants and pharmaceuticals by indigenous communities in the Bolivian Andes and Amazon. Bulletin of the World Health Organization 82: 243–250 (IF 2,4). Leading article in the Research Section.
- De Cupere, Françoise, Ina Vandebroek, Mayra Puentes, Sinesio Torres & Patrick Van Damme (2001) Evaluation of vegetal extracts as biological herbi- and pesticides for their use in Cuban agriculture. Mededelingen / Universiteit Gent, Faculteit Landbouwkundige en Toegepaste Biologische Wetenschappen (Currently Communications in Agricultural and Applied Biological Sciences) 66/2a: 455–462.
