= Society for Ethnobotany =

International learning community on economy

- Abbreviation: SEB
- Formation: 1959; 67 years ago
- Purpose: Furthering ethnobotany
- Region served: Worldwide
- Official language: English
- President: Robbie Hart
- Main organ: Council
- Website: www.ethnobotany.org
- Formerly called: Society for Economic Botany

The Society for Ethnobotany (formerly Society for Economic Botany) is an international learned society covering the fields of ethnobotany and economic botany. It was established in 1959. In 2022 the Society voted to change its name from the Society for Economic Botany to the Society for Ethnobotany, going into effect in June 2023. Its official journal is Ethnobotany and Economic Botany, published on their behalf by Springer Science+Business Media and the New York Botanical Garden Press. The society also publishes a biannual newsletter, Plants and People. The society organizes annual meetings at different locations around the world, where it awards the prize of Distinguished Ethnobotanist to particularly meritorious individuals.

== Distinguished Ethnobotanist prize ==
In 2022 the Society voted to change the name of this award to the Distinguished Ethnobotanist award, going into effect in June 2023. Recent recipients of the Distinguished Economic Botanist prize include:

- Tinde van Andel (2026)
- Rajindra Puri (2025)
- Mark Merlin (2024)
- Bradley Bennett (2023)
- Diane Ragone (2022)
- Pablo Eyzaguirre (2021)
- John Rashford (2019)
- Gary Nabhan (2018)
- Roy Ellen (2017)
- Tony Cunningham (2016)
- Daniel Moerman (2015)
- Jan Salick (2014)
- Will McClatchey (2013)
- Djaja Soejarto (2012)
- Nancy Turner (2011)
- Edelmira Linares and Robert Bye (2010)
- Nina Etkin and Michael J. Balick (2009)
- Brent Berlin and Eloise Berlin (2008)
- W. Hardy Eshbaugh (2007)
- Walter Lewis and Memory Elvin-Lewis
- Harold C. Conklin (2005)
- Gordon Hillman (2004)
- Daniel Zohary (2003)
- Ghillean Prance (2002)
- Isabella Abbott (2001)
- James Duke (2000)
- S. K. Jain (1999)
- Hugh H. Iltis (1998)
- Carlos M. Ochoa (1997)
- Jack G. Hawkes (1996)
- Varro Tyler (1995)
- Walton C. Galinat (1994)
- Mildred Mathias (1993)
- Douglas Yen (1992)
- N. W. Simmonds (1991)
- Herbert G. Baker (1990)
- Jack L. Beal (1989)
- Oswald Tippo (1988)
- Charles Rick (1987)
- E. Hernández X. (1986)
- Jack R. Harlan (1985)
- Charles B. Heiser (1984)
- N. R. Farnsworth (1983)
- William L. Brown (1982)
- William H. Tallent (1981)
- Thomas W. Whitaker (1980)
- Richard Evans Schultes (1979)
- Julia F. Morton (1978)

== Past presidents ==
Past presidents of the society include:

- Sonia Peter (2025)
- Alex McAlvay (2024)
- Heike Vibrans (2023)
- Wendy Applequist (2022)
- John de la Parra (2021)
- Nanci Ross (2020)
- Mark Nesbitt (2019)
- Sunshine Brosi (2018)
- Gayle Fritz (2017)
- Steve Casper (2016)
- Cassandra Quave (2015)
- J. Richard Stepp (2014)
- Robert Bye (2013)
- Gail E. Wagner (2012)
- Rainer W. Bussmann (2011)
- Mary Eubanks (2010)
- Eve Emshwiller (2009)
- Jim Miller (2008)
- John Rashford (2007)
- Will McClatchey (2006)
- David L. Lentz (2005)
- Bradley Bennett (2004)
- Timothy Johns (2003)
- Gary Martin (2002)
- Brian M. Boom (2001)
- Barbara Pickersgill (2000)
- Beryl Simpson (1999)
- Gail E. Wagner (1998)
- Jan Salick (1997)
- Ghillean T. Prance (1996)
- Richard I. Ford (1995)
- Paul Alan Cox (1994)
- Jean H. Langenheim (1993)
- Michael J. Balick (1992)
- A. Douglas Kinghorn (1991)
- Walter Lewis (1990)
- David M. Bates (1989)
- Paul A. Fryxell (1988)
- Lawrence Kaplan (1987)
- Gregory J. Anderson (1986)
- Susan Verhoek (1985)
- Garrison Wilkes (1984)
- W. Hardy Eshbaugh (1983)
- Abraham D. Krikorian (1982)
- Harry H. Fong (1981)
- John H. Beaman (1980)
- C. Earle Smith Jr. (1979)
- Charles B. Heiser (1978)
- Norman Doorenbos (1976)
- Walter H. Hodge (1975)
- Monroe E. Wall (1974)
- Howard S. Gentry (1973)
- Maynard W. Quimby (1972)
- R. Gordon Wasson (1971)
- George H.M. Lawrence (1970)
- Robert F. Raffauf (1969)
- Thomas W. Whitaker (1968)
- Otto Frankel (1967)
- Albert F. Hill (1966)
- Edgar Anderson (1965)
- Ivan A. Wolff (1964)
- S. Morris Kupchan (1963)
- Paul C. Mangelsdorf (1962)
- C.O. Erlanson (1961)
- Ernest Guenther (1959)
