= Mark Nesbitt =

Mark Nesbitt (born 3 June 1961) is a British ethnobotanist and curator. Since 1999, he has worked at the Royal Botanic Gardens, Kew, where he serves as Senior Research Leader for Interdisciplinary Research and Curator of the Economic Botany Collection.

== Education and early career ==
Nesbitt studied Agricultural Botany at the University of Reading before completing an MSc in bioarchaeology (archaeobotany option) at the UCL Institute of Archaeology in 1984. He went on to work at the British Institute at Ankara in Turkey, conducting archaeobotanical analysis for various archaeological excavations. His field research highlighted the need to improved identification techniques for wild grass grains (caryopses). Between 1994 and 1997, he undertook a NERC funded PhD at the Institute of Archaeology, UCL on ‘Archaeobotanical identification of Near Eastern grass seeds’, supervised by Gordon Hillman.

== Career and research ==
Nesbitt's research has widely published on plant-people interactions past and present, in particular: histories of grains, medicines and plant fibres such as barkcloth, textiles and basketry. He specialises in the repurposing of historic botanical collections to address contemporary global issues.

He holds honorary posts as a visiting professor at Royal Holloway, University of London (since 2017) where he collaborates on projects with Professor Felix Driver, and Honorary Associate Professor at the UCL Institute of Archaeology (since 2010). He is the current president of the British Society for the History of Pharmacy and a former president of the Society for Economic Botany (2019).

== Awards & publications ==
In 2022, Nesbitt was awarded the William Aiton Medal for his exceptional service to the Royal Botanic Gardens, Kew. That same year he delivered Distinguished Ethnobotanist lecture the University of Kent, titled ‘Awakening the past: Ethnobotany, Collections and History’.

Notable books include Curating biocultural collections (2014, with Jan Salick and Katie Konchar) which won the Postgraduate Textbook Prize in the Royal Society of Biology Book Awards, 2015; Just the tonic: a natural history of tonic water (2019, with Kim Walker) which won a Fortnum & Mason Book Award, 2020; and An ancient Mesopotamian herbal (2023, with Barbara Böck and Shahina A. Ghazanfar).
