= Vandebroek =

Vandebroek is a surname. Notable people with the surname include:

- Ina Vandebroek, American botanist
- Sophie Vandebroek, Belgian electrical engineer
