= American Society of Plant Taxonomists =

Botanical organization

Logo

The American Society of Plant Taxonomists (ASPT) is a botanical organization formed in 1935 to "foster, encourage, and promote education and research in the field of plant taxonomy, to include those areas and fields of study that contribute to and bear upon taxonomy and herbaria", according to its bylaws. It is incorporated in the state of Wyoming, and its office is at the University of Wyoming, Department of Botany.

The ASPT publishes a quarterly botanical journal, Systematic Botany, and the irregular series Systematic Botany Monographs. The society gives annual awards for excellence in Botany. The Society gives the Asa Gray Award for "outstanding accomplishments pertinent to the goals of the Society," and the Peter Raven Award to a botanist who has "made exceptional efforts at outreach to non-scientists."

== Asa Gray Awardees ==
- 2025: Charlotte M. Taylor
- 2024: Richard G. Olmstead
- 2023: Mark W. Chase
- 2022: Thomas B. Croat
- 2021: Elizabeth Kellogg
- 2020: Jeff Doyle
- 2019: Lucinda McDade
- 2018: Vicki Funk
- 2017: Michael Donoghue
- 2016: Peter F. Stevens
- 2015: Warren Lambert Wagner
- 2014: Alan Smith
- 2013: Bruce Baldwin
- 2012: Noel and Patricia Holmgren
- 2011: Walter S. Judd
- 2010: Harold E. Robinson
- 2009: Alan Graham
- 2008: William R. Anderson
- 2007: Scott A. Mori
- 2006: Douglas E. Soltis and Pamela S. Soltis
- 2005: Grady Webster
- 2004: John Beaman
- 2003: Beryl B. Simpson
- 2002: Natalie Uhl
- 2001: Robert F. Thorne
- 2000: William T. Stearn
- 1999: Tod Stuessey
- 1998: Ghillean Prance
- 1997: Daniel J. Crawford
- 1996: Peter Raven
- 1995: Jerzy Rzedowski
- 1994: Hugh H. Iltis
- 1993: Sherwin Carlquist
- 1992: Albert Charles Smith
- 1991: Billie L. Turner
- 1990: Warren H. Wagner
- 1989: Rupert C. Barneby
- 1988: Charles B. Heiser
- 1987: Reed C. Rollins
- 1986: Lincoln Constance
- 1985: Arthur Cronquist
- 1984: Rogers McVaugh

== Peter Raven Awardees ==
- 2025: W. John Kress
- 2024: John Kartesz
- 2023: Naomia Fraga
- 2022: Peter Bernhardt
- 2021: Tanisha Williams
- 2020: Susan Pell
- 2019: Lena Struwe
- 2018: Chris Martine
- 2017: Hans Walter Lack
- 2016: Lynn G. Clark
- 2015: John Weirsema
- 2014: Ken Cameron
- 2013: No award
- 2012: No award
- 2011: Robbin C. Moran
- 2010: Barney Lipscomb
- 2009: Sandra Knapp
- 2008: W. Hardy Eshbaugh
- 2007: John T. Mickel
- 2006: Art Kruckeberg
- 2005: Alan W. Meerow
- 2004: David J. Mabberley
- 2003: Frederick W. Case
- 2002: Charles Heiser
- 2001: Richard C. Harris
- 2000: Peter Raven
