= Michael Jeffrey Balick =

American botanist

Michael J. Balick
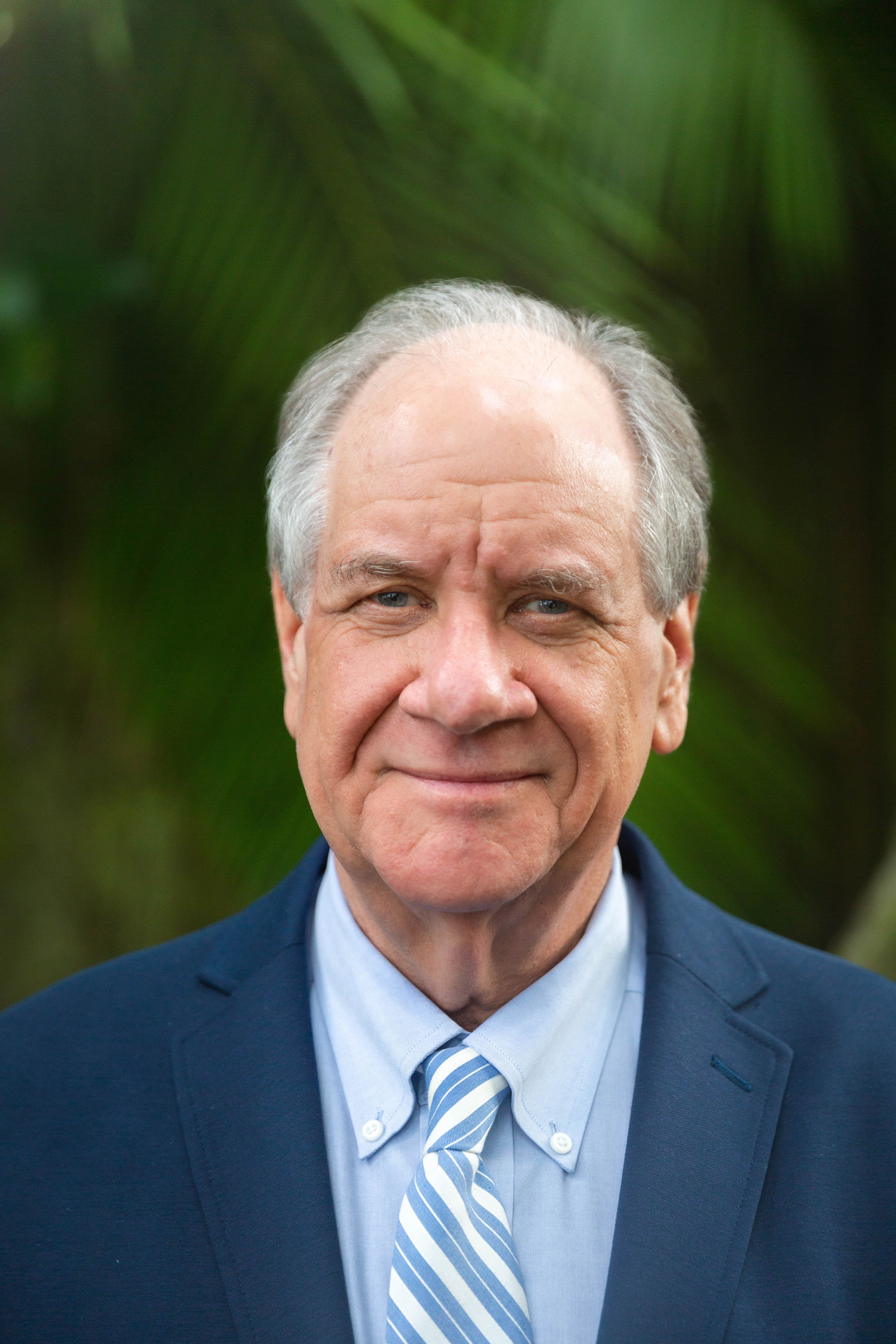
- Born: July 21, 1952 (age 74); Philadelphia, Pennsylvania, U.S.
- Education: University of Delaware; Harvard University
- Known for: Plants, People, and Culture (1996, 2020)
- Scientific career
- Workplaces: New York Botanical Garden
- Thesis: The biology and economics of the Oenocarpus-Jessenia (Palmae) complex (1980)
- Doctoral advisor: Richard Evans Schultes
- Author abbrev. (botany): Balick

Michael Jeffrey Balick (born 1952) is an American ethnobotanist, economic botanist, and pharmacognosist, known as a leading expert on medicinal and toxic plants, biocultural conservation and the plant family Arecaceae (palms).

== Education and career ==
Michael J. Balick graduated in 1975 with B.Sc. in agriculture and plant sciences from the University of Delaware, after spending the academic year 1972–1972 at Tel Aviv University. At Harvard University he graduated with M.Sc. in 1976 and Ph.D. in 1980, where he also attended Harvard Business School. At the New York Botanical Garden (NYBG) he was from 1980 to 1989 an associate curator and the executive assistant to NYBG's president and is since 1989 NYBG's Philecology Curator of Economic Botany. In 1981 he was the co-founder, with Ghillean Prance, of NYBG's Institute of Economic Botany and since 1990 has been the institute's director. Balick has been an adjunct professor at Columbia University, Fordham University, the City University of New York, New York University, and Yale University.

Balick has worked in ethnobotany and ethnomedicine in remote areas of the tropics with people of indigenous cultures, as well as in New York City with people having traditional herbal knowledge from China and the Caribbean. From 1974 to 1975 he lived in Costa Rica and helped build the Wilson Botanical Garden at the Las Cruces Biological Station. From 1975 to 1997 he was a frequent researcher in Amazonia, where he studied palms and their local uses. He has done research and taught university courses in "ethnobotany and ethnomedicine, phytochemistry, floristics and conservation biology."

In 1979, he was the first to receive 'The George H.M. Lawrence Memorial Award', in the amount of $2,000, presented by the Hunt Institute for Botanical Documentation, Carnegie Mellon University and presented at the annual banquet of the Botanical Society of America.

Balick is the author or co-author of more than 160 scientific articles or book chapters. He is also the author, co-author, editor, or co-editor of thirty books and monographs, varied among scientific and general interest. He has been a co-collector with more than two dozen botanists, including Brian M. Boom, Andrew J. Henderson, and Ghillean Prance. Balick has been doing research with Gregory M. Plunkett on the plants and ethnobotany of Vanuatu's Tafea Province.

Among his academic and professional honors, Balick was elected in 1999 a Fellow of the American Association for the Advancement of Science (AAAS) and in 2004 received the AAAS International Award for Scientific Cooperation. In 2018 he received the David Fairchild Medal for Plant Exploration of the National Tropical Botanical Garden and in 2020 the H. Marc Cathey Award for outstanding scientific research that has enriched horticulture and plant science from the American Horticultural Society. He is a founding member of the Daylight Academy, a scientific academy based in Zurich, Switzerland. For the academic year 2005-2006 he was a Guggenheim Fellow. He was the president of the Society for Economic Botany in 1992 and in 2009 was a recipient of the Society's Distinguished Economic Botanist award.

In 2024, he joined The Daylight Award jury, selecting Daylight in Architecture and Daylight Research laureates.

He is married to Emily Lewis Penn, a New York City realtor and poet.

== Selected publications ==
=== Articles ===
- Balick, Michael J. (1984). "Ethnobotany of Palms in the Neotropics". Advances in Economic Botany. 1: 9–23. JSTOR 43931365.
- Peters, Charles M.; Balick, Michael J.; Kahn, Francis; Anderson, Anthony B. (1989). "Oligarchic forests of economic plants in Amazonia: utilization and conservation of an important tropical resource". Conservation Biology. 3 (4): 341–349. Bibcode:1989ConBi...3..341P. doi:10.1111/j.1523-1739.1989.tb00240.x. PMID 21129021.
- Balick, Michael J.; Mendelsohn, Robert (1992). "Assessing the Economic Value of Traditional Medicines from Tropical Rain Forests". Conservation Biology. 6 (1): 128–130. Bibcode:1992ConBi...6..128B. doi:10.1046/j.1523-1739.1992.610128.x. JSTOR 2385858.
- Cox, Paul Alan; Balick, Michael J. (1994). "The Ethnobotanical Approach to Drug Discovery". Scientific American. 270 (6): 82–87. Bibcode:1994SciAm.270f..82C. doi:10.1038/scientificamerican0694-82. JSTOR 24942736. PMID 8023119.
- Mendelsohn, Robert; Balick, M. J. (1995). "The value of undiscovered pharmaceuticals in tropical forests". Economic Botany. 49 (2): 223–228. doi:10.1007/BF02862929. S2CID 39978586.
- Balick, Michael J. (1996). "Transforming Ethnobotany for the New Millennium". Annals of the Missouri Botanical Garden. 83 (1): 58–66. doi:10.2307/2399968. ISSN 0026-6493. JSTOR 2399968.
- Sheldon, Jennie Wood; Balick, Michael J.; Laird, Sarah A.; Milne, George M. (1997). "Medicinal Plants: Can Utilization and Conservation Coexist?". Advances in Economic Botany. 12: i–104. JSTOR 43931401.
- Slish, Donald F.; Ueda, Hiroko; Arvigo, Rosita; Balick, Michael J. (1999). "Ethnobotany in the search for vasoactive herbal medicines". Journal of Ethnopharmacology. 66 (2): 159–165. doi:10.1016/S0378-8741(98)00225-6. PMID 10433472.
- Balick, Michael J.; Kronenberg, Fredi; Ososki, Andreana L.; Reiff, Marian; Fugh-Berman, Adriane; Bonnie, O'Connor; Roble, Maria; Lohr, Patricia; Atha, Daniel (2000). "Medicinal plants used by latino healers for women's health conditions in New York City". Economic Botany. 54 (3): 344–357. doi:10.1007/BF02864786. S2CID 33839980.
- Sosa, S.; Balick, M.J.; Arvigo, R.; Esposito, R.G.; Pizza, C.; Altinier, G.; Tubaro, Aurelia (2002). "Screening of the topical anti-inflammatory activity of some Central American plants". Journal of Ethnopharmacology. 81 (2): 211–215. doi:10.1016/S0378-8741(02)00080-6. PMID 12065153.
- Camporese, A.; Balick, M.J.; Arvigo, R.; Esposito, R.G.; Morsellino, N.; Simone, F.De; Tubaro, A. (2003). "Screening of anti-bacterial activity of medicinal plants from Belize (Central America)". Journal of Ethnopharmacology. 87 (1): 103–107. doi:10.1016/S0378-8741(03)00115-6. PMID 12787962.
- Vandebroek, Ina; Balick, Michael J. (2012). "Globalization and Loss of Plant Knowledge: Challenging the Paradigm". PLOS ONE. 7 (5) e37643. Bibcode:2012PLoSO...737643V. doi:10.1371/journal.pone.0037643. PMC 3360753. PMID 22662184.

=== Books ===
- Balick, Michael J. (1988). Jessenia and Oenocarpus: Neotropical Oil Palms Worthy of Domestication. Food and Agriculture Organization of the United Nations. ISBN 978-92-5-102676-2.
- Balick, Michael J.; Beck, Hans T. (1990). Useful Palms of the World: A Synoptic Bibliography. Columbia University Press. ISBN 978-0-231-06676-1.
- Prance, G. T.; Balick, M. J., eds. (1990). New directions in the study of plants and people: research contributions from the Institute of Economic Botany. Advances in Economic Botany 8. The New York Botanical Garden. ISBN 0-89327-347-3.
- Anderson, Anthony B.; May, Peter H.; Balick, Michael J. (1991). Subsidy from nature: palm forests, peasantry, and development on an Amazon frontier. New York: Columbia University Press. ISBN 978-0-231-07222-9.
- Arvigo, Rosita; Balick, Michael J.; Evans, Laura (1993). Rainforest Remedies: One Hundred Healing Herbs of Belize. Lotus Press. ISBN 978-0-914955-13-9.
- Balick, Michael J.; Cox, Paul Alan (1996). Plants, people, and culture: the science of ethnobotany. New York: Scientific American Library.
  - Balick, Michael J.; Cox, Paul Alan (19 August 2020). Plants, People, and Culture: The Science of Ethnobotany. Garland Science. ISBN 978-1-000-09848-8.
- Sheldon, Jennie Wood; Balick, Michael J.; Laird, Sarah A. (1997). Medicinal Plants: Can Utilization and Conservation Coexist?. Advances in Economic Botany, Volume 12. New York Botanical Garden, Scientific Publications Department. ISBN 978-0-89327-406-1.
- Balick, Michael J.; Nee, Michael; Atha, Daniel E. (2000). Checklist of the Vascular Plants of Belize, with Common Names and Uses. New York Botanical Garden Press. ISBN 978-0-89327-434-4.
- Posey, Darrell Addison; Balick, Michael J., eds. (2006). Human Impacts on Amazonia: The Role of Traditional Ecological Knowledge in Conservation and Development. Columbia University Press. ISBN 978-0-231-10588-0.
- Nelson, Lewis S.; Shih, Richard D.; Balick, Michael J. (18 December 2007). Handbook of Poisonous and Injurious Plants. Springer Science & Business Media. ISBN 978-0-387-33817-0; revision of 1985 AMA Handbook of Poisonous and Injurious Plants
- Balick, Michael J. (26 February 2009). Ethnobotany of Pohnpei: Plants, People, and Island Culture. University of Hawaii Press. ISBN 978-0-8248-3749-5.
- Balick, Michael (29 April 2014). Rodale's 21st-Century Herbal: A Practical Guide for Healthy Living Using Nature's Most Powerful Plants. Harmony/Rodale. ISBN 978-1-60961-805-6.
- Balick, Michael J.; Arvigo, Rosita (2015). Messages from the Gods: A Guide to the Useful Plants of Belize. Oxford University Press. ISBN 978-0-19-996576-2.
- Dahmer, S.; Balick, Michael J.; Hillmann-Kitalong, Ann, et al. (2018). Palau Primary Health Care Manual: Health Care in Palau, Combining Conventional Treatments and Traditional Uses of Plants for Health and Healing. The New York Botanical Garden, Ministry of Health, Republic of Palau, Belau National Museum. ISBN 9781477446355
- Nelson, L.S.; Balick, Michael J. (2020). Handbook of Poisonous and Injurious Plants, Third Edition. Springer Science and Business Media, New York Botanical Garden. ISBN 9781493989249.
- Balick, Michael J.; Hillmann-Kitalong, Ann (2020). Ethnobotany of Palau: Plants, People and Island Culture, Volume 1. Belau National Museum/The New York Botanical Garden. ISBN 9798685012555.
- Balick, Michael J.; Hillmann-Kitalong, Ann (2020). Ethnobotany of Palau: Plants, People and Island Culture, Volume 2. Belau National Museum/The New York Botanical Garden. ISBN 9798685017864.
- Balick, Michael J.; Cox, Paul Alan (2020) Plants, People and Culture: The Science of Ethnobotany, 2nd Edition. Taylor and Francis Group/CRC Press. ISBN 9780815345909.
