= Rainer W. Bussmann =

German botanist and vegetation ecologist (born 1967)

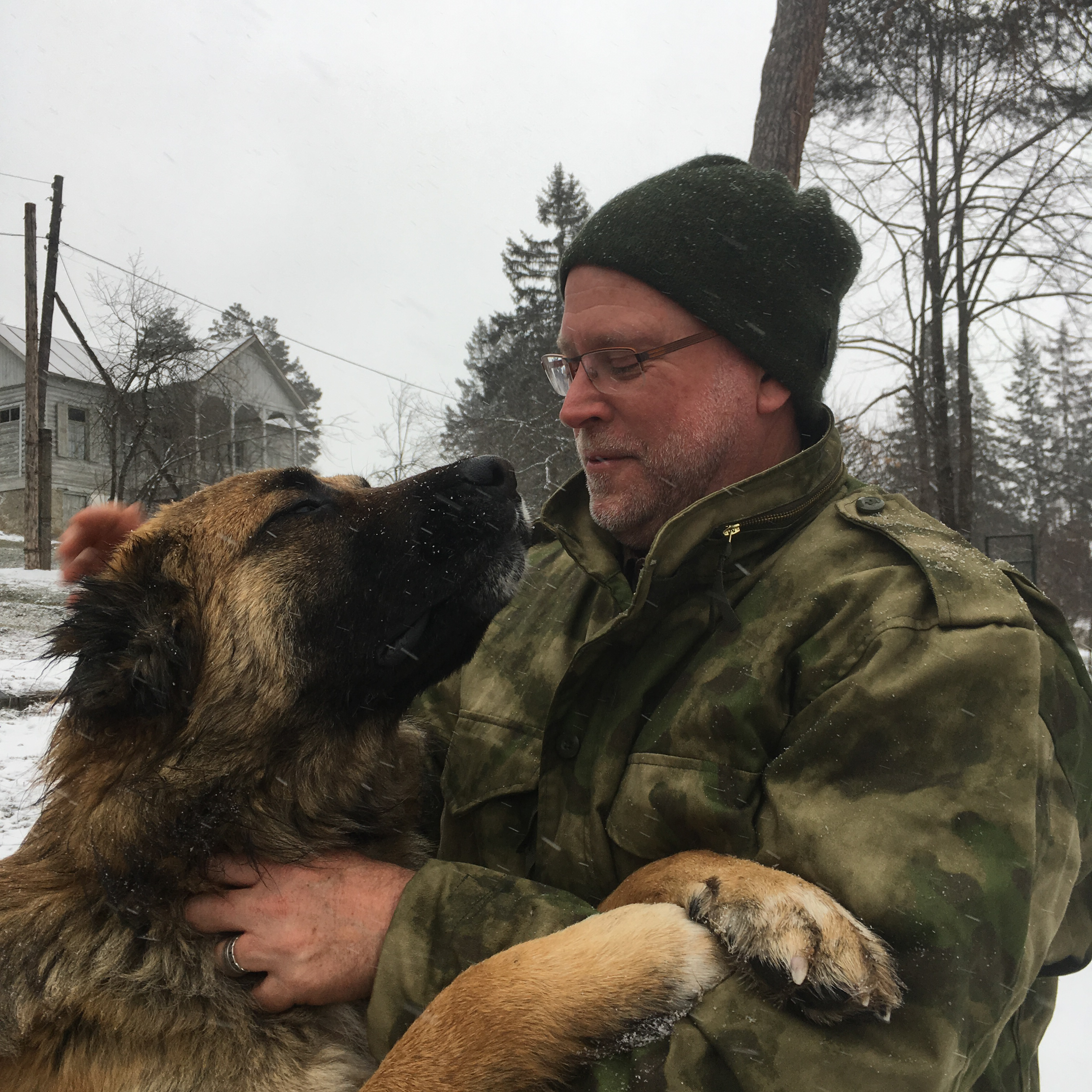
- Born: 30 May 1967 (age 59); Leutkirch im Allgäu, West Germany
- Citizenship: Germany, United States
- Education: University of Bayreuth (Dr. rer. nat.); University of Tübingen (Dipl. Biol.)
- Occupations: Professor of Ethnobotany and Head, Department of Ethnobotany, Institute of Botany, Ilia State University, Tbilisi, Georgia
- Years active: 1991–present

Rainer W. Bussmann (Leutkirch, 30 May 1967) is a German-US American botanist and vegetation ecologist, specializing in ethnobotany and ethnobiology, wild food plants, wild crop relatives, climate change, gastronomic botany and preservation of traditional knowledge in the Andes, the Caucasus and the Himalayas. He has worked at the University of Bayreuth, University of Hawaii, University of Texas, the Missouri Botanical Garden, Ilia State University and the State Museum of Natural History Karlsruhe; he has founded several international non-governmental organizations, including Nature and Culture International, Saving Knowledge, and Ethnomont.

== Scientific work ==
From 1994 to 2002 Bussmann worked as Post Doc at the University of Bayreuth developing ecological research in the mountain forests of Kenya and Ethiopia, and as scientific coordinator of the DFG (German Science Foundation) program, "Functionality in a Tropical Mountain Rainforest: Diversity, Dynamic Processes and Utility Potentials under Ecosystem Perspectives featured in the German television documentary series "Humboldts Erben". During that same time he led investigations of vegetation in the forests of East Africa, including the establishment of the Maseno University Botanical Garden. Bussmann was also one of the founding participants of the Global Mountain Biodiversity Assessment (GMBA).

From 2003 to 2006 he joined the University of Hawaii (Manoa) as Scientific Director of the Harold L. Lyon Arboretum, and as associate professor of botany, focusing his research on the ecology of cloud forests and medicinal plants in northern Peru, under the Program of International Health Research Training and Health of Minorities (MHIRT) of the National Institute of Health. During 2006–2007 he joined the Department of Geography at the University of Texas (Austin) as a visiting professor.

In 2007 he was appointed director of the William L. Brown Center, and William L. Brown Curator of Economic Botany at the Missouri Botanical Garden. Over the next decade, Bussmann transformed the center into an international research unit with projects on five continents, ranging from traditional ethnobotany and ethnopharmacology, to regeneration ecology, the impact of climate change, Intellectual Property Rights, and the application of the "Nagoya Protocol on Access to Genetic Resources and Fair and Equitable Sharing in Benefits Arising from its Use".

In 2017 he left the Missouri Botanical Garden to co-found a new Department of Ethnobotany at the Institute of Botany and Bakuriani Alpine Botanical Garden (BABG) at Ilia State University, Georgia (Caucasus).

His standard botanical author abbreviation is Bussmann, and he has described a variety of plant species new to science.

Bussmann is recognized in the archaeological and pharmacological field for the identification of a Moche hallucinogen found in many tombs and found in the ceramics and paintings of the culture in Northern Peru, the "Ulluchu".

As part of their research, Bussmann's group pays special attention to the rights of indigenous communities, supporting them in their actions generated the effect of global change. In the "Chácobo Ethnobotanical Project" they showed how indigenous researchers, trained in ethnobotanical methods, can carry out a study on the same level as university scientists. All project results, and translations of previous work, were delivered to the tribe, and local researchers participated as co-authors in all publications.

Bussmann is editor-in-chief of Ethnobotany Research and Applications, deputy editor of the Journal of Ethnobiology and Ethnomedicine, associate editor of Ethnobiology and Conservation, academic editor of PLOS One, editor of ethnobotany topics for the Nordic Journal of Botany, and member of the editorial boards of Antibiotics, Life, Indian Journal of Traditional Knowledge, Pleione and Nelumbo.

He has been involved in the development of professional societies in the field of ethnobotany and ethnobiology as president and member of the council of the Society for Economic Botany (2008–2020), International Society for Ethnopharmacology (2010–2014), Society of Ethnobiology (2008–2011), Botanical Society of America (2008–2011), International Society of Ethnobiology (2008–2010), and holds memberships in the Association for the Taxonomic Study of the Flora of Africa, Bayerische Botanische Gesellschaft, East Africa Natural History Society, International Society of Ethnobiology, International Society for Ethnopharmacology, Society for Economic Botany, and Society of Ethnobiology. In addition to his academic work, Bussmann has co-founded several international non-governmental organizations in the areas of Biodiversity Conservation and Traditional Knowledge, including Nature and Culture International, Saving Knowledge and Etnomont. He featured in the German television documentary Secret world of herbs.

== Distinctions ==
- Society for Ethnopharmacology-India (SFE-India) Outstanding International Ethnopharmacologist Award – 2022.
- Ilia Chavchavadze Medal for Scientific Excellence 2021. Instituted in 2017 to commemorate the 200 birthday of Ilia Chavchavadze, the Ilia Medal is awarded annually to scientists for excellence in science and scholarship.
- James Duke Award of the American Botanical Council 2012 por la publicación "Medicinal Plants and the Legacy of Richard E. Schultes".
- Two botanical species were named after Bussmann. Poa bussmannii H. Scholz described on 2011, which has Turkey as its native range. Gentianella bussmannii J.S. Pringle, described in 2017 is a native species of the Peruvian Andes.

== Publications ==
Bussmann is the author of 450 peer-reviewed articles, more than 1,300 book chapters, and is the author / editor of 38 books. According to Elsevier, he is one of the most cited ethnobotanists and recognized among the most influential scientists worldwide. He currently serves as editor-in-chief of the "Ethnobotany of Mountain Regions" book series published by Springer Nature.

=== Selected books and articles ===
- Bussmann, RW; Paniagua-Zambrana, NY. (Eds.) (2020). Ethnobotany of Mountain Regions. Springer International Publishing: Cham.
- Kunwar, RM, Sher, H. Bussmann, RW (Eds.) (2020). Ethnobotany of the Himalayas. Springer International Publishing: Cham. (ISBN 978-3-030-57407-9)
- Bussmann, RW (Ed.)(2020).Ethnobotany of the Mountain Regions of Africa. Springer International Publishing: Cham.pp. XX + 700 (ISBN 978-3-030-38385-5)
- Batsatsashvili, K; Kikvidze, Z; Bussmann, RW (Eds.) (2020). Ethnobotany of Mountain Regions - Central Asia and Altai. Springer International Publishing, Cham. pp. XXII + 881; (ISBN 978-3-030-28946-1)
- Batsatsashvili, K; Kikvidze, Z; Bussmann, RW (Eds.) (2020). Ethnobotany of Mountain Regions - Far Eastern Europe. Springer International Publishing, Cham.pp. XXIX + 1063; (ISBN 978-3-030-28939-3)
- Paniagua-Zambrana, NY; Bussmann, RW (Eds.) (2020). Ethnobotany of the Andes. Springer International Publishing, Cham. pp. XXXI + 1955; (ISBN 978-3-030-28932-4)
- Bussmann, R.W (Ed.) (2017). Ethnobotany of the Caucasus. Springer International Publishing International Publishing: Cham; XXVII, 746p. (ISBN 978-3-319-49411-1)
- Paniagua-Zambrana, N.Y., Bussmann, R.W (Eds.) (2017). La Etnobotánica de los Chácobo en el Siglo XXI. William L. Brown Center, MBG, St. Louis. (ISBN 978-0-9960231-5-3)
- Bussmann, R.W., Sharon, D. (2015a). Medicinal plants of the Andes and the Amazon – The magic and medicinal flora of Northern Peru. William L. Brown Center, MBG, St. Louis. (ISBN 978-0-9960231-2-2)
- Bussmann, R.W., Sharon, D. (2015b). Plantas medicinales de los Andes y la Amazonía – La flora mágica y medicinal del Norte de Peru. William L. Brown Center, MBG, St. Louis. (ISBN 978-0-9960231-3-9)
- Paniagua-Zambrana, N.Y., Bussmann, R.W., Tellez, C., Vega, C. (Eds.)(2014). Los Chacobo y su historia en el siglo XX. William L. Brown Center, MBG, St. Louis. (ISBN 978-0-9960231-0-8)
- Paniagua-Zambrana, N.Y., Bussmann, R.W., Blacutt, E., Macia, M.J. (Eds.) (2011). Los Chacobo y las Palmeras. William L. Brown Center, MBG, St. Louis, (ISBN 978-0-9848415-0-9)
- Bussmann, R.W., Sharon, D. (2007). Plants of the four winds - The magic and medicinal flora of Peru. Plantas de los cuatro vientos - La flora mágica y medicinal del Perú. Arogya, Honolulu. (ISBN 978-0-9789962-3-9)
- Bussmann, R.W., Sharon, D. (2007). Plants of longevity - The medicinal flora of Vilcabamba. Plantas de longevidad - La flora medicinal de Vilcabamba. Arogya, Honolulu (ISBN 978-0-9789962-2-2)
- Bussmann, R.W. (1994). The forests of Mount Kenya (Kenya) - Vegetation, Ecology, Destruction and Management of a tropical mountain forest ecosystem. Dissertation Universität Bayreuth.
- Bussmann, Rainer W.; Beck, Erwin (14 December 1995). "The forests of Mt. Kenya (Kenya), a phytosociological synopsis". Phytocoenologia. 25 (4): 467–560. Bibcode:1995Phytc..25..467B. doi:10.1127/phyto/25/1995/467. ISSN 0340-269X.
