= Organization for Flora Neotropica =

UNESCO nongovernmental organization

The Organization for Flora Neotropica (OFN) is a UNESCO nongovernmental organization in Category B (biosphere reserves). OFN was founded in 1964, due to the efforts of the botanists José Cuatrecasas and F. Raymond Fosberg. OFN's main goal is the publication of a complete inventory of the flora of the entire New World tropics.

OFN's official publication is Flora Neotropica, a series of botanical monographs published by New York Botanical Garden Press. In addition to producing monographs on plants and fungi, OFN's goals are to promote neotropical botany by (1) assisting professional botanists, (2) promoting collaboration among botanical institutions, (3) facilitating botanical training of students, (4) strengthening Latin American herbaria and botanical institutions, and (5) protecting neotropical natural vegetation.

OFN has a Commission consisting of 150 members from 30 different countries. OFN's Executive Board elects new Commission members among nominees suggested by the Commission members. OFN's annual meeting of the Commission and Executive Board is held in Latin America, usually as part of a botanical congress which is either national or regional. The location of OFN's administrative headquarters is the New York Botanical Garden. The business of OFN's annual meeting is conducted in English, Spanish, or Portuguese.

Scientists affiliated (in the present or past) with OFN include Frank Almeda, Pieter Baas, Brian Boom, Armando Carlos Cervi, Thomas Croat, Thomas Franklin Daniel, Gerrit Davidse, Robert Louis Dressler, Enrique Forero, Christian Feuillet, Jean-Jacques de Granville, Robbert Gradstein, Sandra Knapp, Peter Møller Jørgensen, Gwilym Lewis, Paul Maas, Scott Mori, Ghillean Prance, Peter Raven, Susanne Renner, Laurence Skog, Carmen Ulloa Ulloa, Dieter Carl Wasshausen, Maximilian Weigend, and Marga Werkhoven.
