= Charles Bixler Heiser =

American botanist and ethnobotanist (1920–2010)

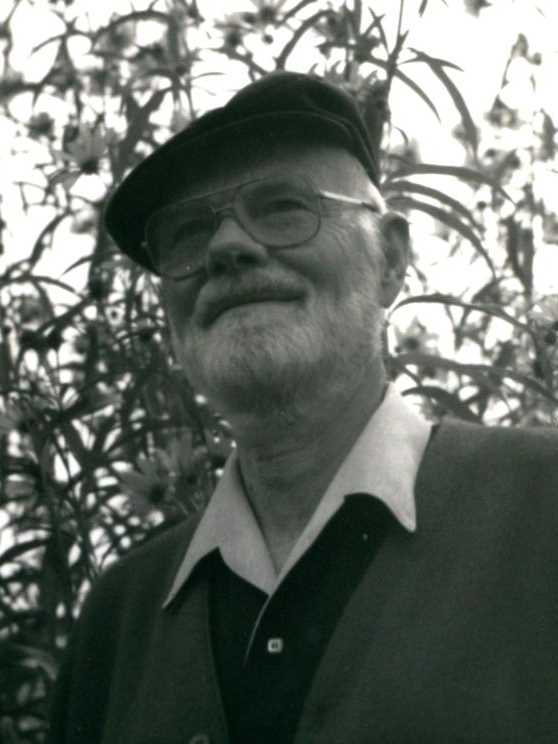
- Heiser, c. 1990
- Born: Charles Bixler Heiser Jr. October 5, 1920; Cynthiana, Indiana
- Died: June 11, 2010 (aged 89)
- Education: Washington University in St. Louis; University of California, Berkeley
- Spouse: Dorothy Gaebler
- Children: 3
- Scientific career
- Fields: Botany; Ethnobotany; Plant biosystematics
- Workplaces: Washington University in St. Louis; University of California, Davis; Indiana University Bloomington
- Doctoral advisor: Herbert Louis Mason
- Doctoral students: W. Hardy Eshbaugh; Barbara Pickersgill
- Author abbrev. (botany): Heiser

Charles Bixler Heiser Jr. (October 5, 1920 – June 11, 2010) was an American professor of botany, known as a leading expert on the sunflower genus Helianthus. He is also noteworthy as the author of a "series of popular books that did much to promote botany to the general public."

== Biography ==
After graduating from Belleville Township High School, Illinois, where he was the senior class president, Heiser attended Washington University in St. Louis. There he was mentored by Robert Everard Woodson and Edgar Anderson and graduated with A.B. in 1943 and M.A. in 1944. In 1944 and the first part of 1945, Heiser was an instructor in the botany department at Washington University in St. Louis. In 1945 he began study for his Ph.D. at the University of California, Berkeley, where he worked with G. Ledyard Stebbins on the genetics of sunflowers, although Louis Mason was Heiser's official doctoral advisor. In 1947 Heiser received his Ph.D. and an edited version of his doctoral dissertation was published in the journal Evolution. For the academic year 1947–1948 he had a teaching position at the University of California, Davis. At Indiana University Bloomington he was from 1947 to 1951 an assistant professor, from 1951 to 1957 an associate professor, from 1957 to 1979 a (full) professor, and from 1979 to 1986 a distinguished professor, retiring in 1986 as distinguished professor emeritus. He supervised 29 doctoral students and remained scientifically active in retirement, including at the Indiana University/Deam Herbarium.

In 1953, as a Guggenheim Fellow, he went on sabbatical leave in Costa Rica to study chili peppers and learn about the local flora. At the Instituto Interamericano de Cooperación para la Agricultura in Turrialba, Costa Rica, he met two students from Ecuador: Jorge Soria and Jaime Díaz. They were important in helping him on his two sabbatical years, 1962 and 1969, in Ecuador.

Heiser, working with Soria, developed a nematode-resistant hybrid between the Solanum species naranjilla cultivated in Ecuador and cocona cultivated in Amazonia for their fruit. The hybrid became commercially significant and widely cultivated in Ecuador.

In 1944 Heiser married Dorothy Gaebler (1921–2015), who was a graduate student in the botany department of Washington University in St. Louis. Upon his death in 2010 he was survived by his widow, two daughters, a son, and seven grandchildren. In 1969 on a flight to Ecuador, Heiser, his wife, and two children were hijacked to Cuba.

== Controversy over the origin of the domesticated sunflower ==
Heiser and several other ethnobotanists claimed that the domesticated sunflower originated in pre-Columbian North America and not in pre-Columbian Mexico. However, other experts have disputed the claim.

== Awards and honors ==
- 1967: President of the American Society of Plant Taxonomists
- 1969: Gleason Award of the New York Botanical Garden
- 1972: Merit Award of the Botanical Society of America
- 1974: President of the Society for the Study of Evolution
- 1978: President of the Society for Economic Botany
- 1980: President of the Botanical Society of America
- 1984: Distinguished Economic Botanist Award of the Society for Economic Botany
- 1985: Pustovoit Award of the International Sunflower Association
- 1987: Member of the United States National Academy of Sciences
- 1988: Asa Gray Award of the American Society of Plant Taxonomists
- 1996: Honorary member of the Instituto de Ciencias Naturales in Ecuador
- 1997: Distinguished Scholar Award of the New York Botanical Garden
- 2002: Raven Outreach Award of the American Society of Plant Taxonomists
- 2004: Garden Globe Award for the book Weeds in my Garden (2003)
- 2007: Centennial Award of the Botanical Society of America

== Selected publications ==
=== Articles ===
- edward eugene Schilling, charles bixler Heiser. 1981. Infrageneric classification of Helianthus (Compositae). publ. International Bureau for Plant Taxonomy and Nomenclature. 11 pp.
- 1980. Peppers of the Americas: at the National Arboretum. 9 pp.
- 1961. Morphological and cytological variation in Helianthus petiolaris with notes on related species. publ. Society for the Study of Evolution. 12 pp.
- 1951. The sunflower among the North American Indians. publ. American Philosophical Soc. 17 pp.
- 1944. Monograph of psilostrophe. publ. Washington Univ.

=== Books ===
- 2003. Weeds in my garden: observations on some misunderstood plants. publ. Timber Press. 247 pp. ISBN 0881925624 online (not a guide to weed identification)
- 1993. The Gourd Book. publ. University of Oklahoma Press. 248 pp. ISBN 0806125721 online
- 1992. Of Plants and People. publ. University of Oklahoma Press. 237 pp. ISBN 0806124105 online
- 1990. Seed to civilization: the story of food. publ. Harvard University Press. 228 pp. ISBN 0674796810
- 1987. The fascinating world of the nightshades: tobacco, mandrake, potato, tomato, pepper, eggplant, etc. publ. Dover Publ. 200 pp. ISBN 0486253805
- 1981. The Sunflower. publ. University of Oklahoma Press. 198 pp. ISBN 0806117435
- 1969. Nightshades: the paradoxical plants. Series of books in biology. publ. W. H. Freeman. 200 pp. ISBN 0716706725
- 1969. The North American sunflowers (Helianthus), Volume 22, Nº 3 Memoirs of the Torrey Botanical Club. publ. Club by the Seeman Printery. 218 pp.
- charles bixler Heiser, carl Sharsmith, kenton lee Chambers, roxana Stinchfield Ferris, john hunter Thomas, ira loren Wiggins, lawrence Beane. 1955. Notes on western North American sunflowers. Volume 4, Part 8 of Contributions from the Dudley Herbarium. 360 pp.
- 1949. Study in the evolution of the sunflower species Helianthus annuus and H. bolanderi, Volume 23, Nº 4 University of California publications in botany. 52 pp.
- 1947. Variability and hybridization in the sunflower species Helianthus annuus and H. bolanderi in California. publ. University of California. 254 pp.
