= Jan Salick =

American botanist

Jan Salick is an American botanist who researches the interaction between humans and plants (ethnobotany) and conservation biology. Her specialisms include alpine environments, climate change, indigenous peoples and traditional knowledge. She is a past-president of the Society for Economic Botany and holds their Distinguished Economic Botanist award. She is also Fellow of the American Association for the Advancement of Science and received the Fairchild Medal for Plant Exploration. In 2019 she retired as Senior Curator of Ethnobotany at the Missouri Botanical Garden, and now has emerita status.

== Education ==
Salick gained her BA at the University of Wisconsin–Madison in 1973 and her MS from Duke University in 1977, both in biology. Her PhD in ecology and evolutionary biology was from Cornell University in 1983, with her dissertation, on the crop plant, cassava (Manihot esculenta), entitled "Agroecology of the Cassava Lacebug".

== Career and research ==
Salick worked at the New York Botanical Garden (1983–89), rising to assistant curator. She then joined the Department of Plant Biology at Ohio University (1989–2000) as assistant and then associate professor of tropical ecology and ethnobotany. She has since been Curator and Senior Curator of Ethnobotany at the Missouri Botanical Garden in St. Louis, and is also an adjunct professor of biology at Washington University in St. Louis. In 2019 she retired from her position at the Missouri Botanical Garden, and now has emerita status.

One of the focusi of her recent research has been the alpine environment of the Himalayas, and in particular, the effects of climate change and human activities. She worked with partners in China, Nepal and Bhutan to establish the Himalayan team of the Global Observation Research Initiative in Alpine Environments (GLORIA), an international network that aims to document plant life diversity in alpine regions globally and to study how it is affected by climate change over time.

Plants used in traditional medicine and other forms of traditional knowledge are another interest. With Wayne Law, Salick documented how the cotton-headed snow lotus (Saussurea laniceps), a rare species of Himalayan snow lotus used in traditional Chinese medicine and also often collected by tourists, has decreased in height over a century, apparently in response to pressure from humans selectively picking taller plants. She has also published on the impact of traditional agricultural and forestry practices, for example, among the Yanesha (or Amuesha) people living on the upper Amazon in Peru.

With Robbie Hart, Salick documented phenological changes with climate change in Himalayan rhododendrons on Mount Yulong near Lijian, China. They also published on comparative ethnobotany between the Naxi and Yi peoples.

Most recently, Salick is investigating ethnobotany and food sovereignty with Native American tribes in Massachusetts and Rhode Island.

Salick served as a member of the International Council for Science (ICSU) Study Group on sustainable development in 2001–2. In 2007, with Anja Byg, she organized a symposium on climate change and indigenous peoples, held at the Tyndall Centre for Climate Change Research, Oxford University, UK. In 2009, with Nancy Ross, she edited a special edition of the journal Global Environmental Change entitled "Traditional Peoples and Climate Change". She co-edited (with Katie Konchar and Mark Nesbitt) the 2014 textbook, Curating Biocultural Collections, published by Royal Botanic Gardens, Kew, which won the Postgraduate Textbook Prize of the Royal Society of Biology in 2015. She has collaborated for years with UNESCO on climate change and traditional knowledge.

== Awards and honors ==
Salick is an elected Fellow of the American Association for the Advancement of Science (1992) and the Linnean Society of London. She served as president of the Society for Economic Botany in 1997–98 and received the society's Distinguished Economic Botanist award in 2014. In 2020 Salick was awarded the David Fairchild Medal for Plant Exploration by the National Tropical Botanical Garden.

== Selected publications ==
Books

- J Salick, K Konchar, M Nesbitt, eds. Curating Biocultural Collections (Royal Botanic Gardens, Kew; 2014) (ISBN 1842464981)
- J Salick, RK Moseley. Khawa Karpo: Tibetan Traditional Knowledge and Biodiversity Conservation (Missouri Botanical Garden Press; 2012) (ISBN 1935641069}

Research papers

- Salick J, Fang ZD, Hart R (2019). "Rapid changes in eastern Himalayan alpine flora with climate change". American Journal of Botany. 106 (4): 1–11. doi:10.1002/ajb2.1263. PMID 30934119. S2CID 91187516.
- Hart R, Salick J (2018). "Vulnerability of phenological progressions over season and elevation to climate change: Rhododendrons of Mt. Yulong". Perspectives in Plant Ecology, Evolution and Systematics. 34: 129–139. Bibcode:2018PPEES..34..129H. doi:10.1016/j.ppees.2018.09.001. S2CID 92508589.
- Byg A, Salick J (2009). "Local perspectives on a global phenomenon—climate change in Eastern Tibetan villages". Global Environmental Change. 19 (2): 156–166. Bibcode:2009GEC....19..156B. doi:10.1016/j.gloenvcha.2009.01.010.
- Law W, Salick J (July 2005). "Human-induced dwarfing of Himalayan snow lotus, Saussurea laniceps (Asteraceae)". Proc. Natl. Acad. Sci. U.S.A. 102 (29): 10218–20. Bibcode:2005PNAS..10210218L. doi:10.1073/pnas.0502931102. PMC 1177378. PMID 16006524. doi:10.1073/pnas.0502931102
- Salick J, Cellinese N, Knapp S (1997). "Indigenous diversity of cassava: generation, maintenance, use and loss among the Amuesha, Peruvian upper Amazon". Economic Botany. 51 (1): 6–19. Bibcode:1997EcBot..51....6S. doi:10.1007/bf02910400. S2CID 24382799.
