= Julia Morton =

American author and botanist

- Born: April 25, 1912; Middlebury, Vermont
- Died: September 10, 1996 (aged 84)
- Occupation: Botanist

Julia Frances McHugh Morton (April 25, 1912 – September 10, 1996) was an American author and botanist. She was a research professor of biology, and director of the Morton Collectanea at the University of Miami. She was elected a Fellow of the Linnean Society of London in 1974. Well known as a lecturer on toxic, edible, and otherwise useful plants, she wrote 10 books and 94 scientific papers, and contributed to an additional 12 books and 27 papers.

== Early life ==
Morton was born Julia Francis McHugh, on April 25, 1912 in Middlebury, Vermont, and grew up on a 100-acre (0.40 km^{2}) farm in rural Vermont where she was interested in agriculture, the outdoors, and natural resources. At the age of 15, her mother and sister died, and she went to New York City to live with her brother. She worked as a commercial artist for several years and married Kendal Paul Morton (1897–1964), a Canadian. By 1933, they had begun work on collating information on food, medicinal, and other useful plants. They assembled copies or clippings of existing material and filed it away in file cabinets. They housed this compilation in an office near the New York Public Library, and it soon became known as The Morton Collectanea in academia.

== The war and the first publication ==
When World War II started, the Mortons returned to Canada, where Kendal planned to enter military service and edit a military camp newspaper. However he failed his physical examination due to a heart murmur, and was exempted from service. Rather than remain in Canada or the US as civilians, the Mortons chose to move to the Bahamas. They placed most of the Collectanea in storage, but took entries on tropical fruits with them to Nassau, believing them likely to be useful.

By consulting and adding to the files they brought with them to Nassau and by their studies of the plant life there, the Mortons prepared the manuscript and illustrations for their first publication, Fifty Tropical Fruits of Nassau. Julia proved to be an excellent photographer and photographically illustrated nearly all of her subsequent publications. The book of 101 pages was published in 1946. A contemporary review in Plant Physiology characterized it as "well recommended by qualified botanists" and calling it "richly illustrated" and "quite complete"

== Life in Florida and further work ==
After the war ended, the Mortons were invited to work at the Subtropical Experimental Station in Homestead, Florida in association with George Ruehle and Dr. Bruce Ledin. Working with Ledin they produced the manuscript for the book 400 Plants of South Florida. Their work came to the attention of the president of the University of Miami, Bowman Foster Ashe, who offered them positions as professors at the Coral Gables campus.

Julia Morton along with her husband Kendal were among the founders of the original Rare Fruit Council, which was founded on March 11, 1955, in Miami. This "Tropical Fruit Study Group" was named Rare Fruit Council by Julia Morton after the group's initial meeting.

President Ashe approved setting up the Collectanea at the new campus, and with the aid of professor Taylor Alexander, the files were installed in a new, more spacious location, and students employed to select and organize new material. This allowed the Collectanea to be expanded, and visiting scholars had room to work and free access to the material. By 1996 the Collectanea had grown to 500 file drawers and included approximately 15,000 species, but remained a manually collated and indexed resource.

Although their initial work was on edible plants, their area of interest increased to cover poisonous plants as well as useful ones, both edible and ornamental. Additional books were published, and a suggestion that Julia's plant photographs were suitable for charts inspired the creation of two wall posters of "Plants Poisonous to People," one focusing on internally poisonous plants, and the other on skin and respirator irritants.

Kendal Morton died in 1964, according to her book 500 Plants of South Florida 1974, but Julia continued their research and field work. Morton did research into use of plants in the treatment of cancer in the West Indies at the behest of the National Cancer Institute. She also did research into edible plants to aid in survival situations in the Philippines and Southeast Asia during the Vietnam War, and wrote survival instructions for troops. Morton also conducted surveys of cashew and other edible nut plantations in Venezuela, Colombia and Peru.

Morton became known as an expert on plant poisonings and was often consulted by local authorities. She offered advice and worked to educate the public. Lawrence Kaplan, an emeritus professor of botany at the University of Massachusetts Boston and editor of the journal of the Society for Economic Botany, which Mrs. Morton helped found, said "She was the poison plant center in South Florida". Starting in 1954 when she began consulting for them, the Poison Control Center referred most plant poison calls to her. Although she received an honorary doctorate from Florida State University in 1973, she never formally attended college.

Morton continued to write, lecture, and answer inquiries at the Collectanea even after retiring. She retired from teaching in 1993, after being a University of Miami professor for about four decades. She was critically injured in an automobile accident on August 28, 1996, and died on September 10, 1996.

== Partial list of publications ==
This is a representative list rather than an exhaustive one:

- Fifty Tropical Fruits of Nassau (1946)
- 400 Plants of South Florida (1949)
- Some Useful and Ornamental Plants of the Caribbean Gardens (Botanical gardens, 1955)
- The Mamey (Florida State Horticultural Society, 1962)
- Wild Plants for Survival in South Florida (Hurricane House, 1962)
- Plants Poisonous to People (Hurricane House, 1971)
- Exotic Plants (1973) translated into French as Plantes exotiques
- Folk Remedies of the Low Countries (1974)
- The Atlas of Medicinal Plants of Middle America (C.C. Thomas, 1981).
- Fruits of Warm Climates (1987) (online)
- Herbs and spices. New York: Golden Press, 1976

== Honors ==
- Research Professor of Biology and Director of the Morton Collectanea, University of Miami
- Florida State University honorary doctorate for her research and writings for the National Institutes of Health and the US Department of Defense, 1973.
- Elected Fellow of the Linnean Society of London, 1974.
- Named the first Distinguished Economic Botanist by the international Society for Economic Botany, 1978.
- Served as President of the Florida State Horticultural Society, 1979.
