= Beryl B. Simpson =

American botanist (born 1942)

Beryl Simpson
- Education: Harvard University; Radcliffe College
- Spouse: Jack Neff
- Children: 2
- Awards: Greenman Award (1970), Cooley Award (1971), Asa Gray Award (2003), José Cuatrecasas Medal for Excellence in Tropical Botany (2010)
- Scientific career
- Fields: Tropical Botany
- Workplaces: Harvard University; National Museum of Natural History; University of Texas at Austin
- Author abbrev. (botany): B.B.Simpson

Beryl B. Simpson is a professor emerita in the Department of Integrative Biology at the University of Texas at Austin. Previously she was an associate curator at the Smithsonian National Museum of Natural History in the Department of Botany. She studies plant systematics and tropical botany, focusing on angiosperms found in the American Southwest, Mexico, and Central and South America. She was awarded the José Cuatrecasas Medal for Excellence in Tropical Botany for her decades of work on the subject.

== Life and career ==
Simpson became interested in botany as a child. She would cut seeds and try to create hybrids by pushing two ends together. During high school her interest in plants continued, and her science fair project on "The Economic Aspects of the Rose" resulted in her working for Richard Howard at the Botanical Museum at Harvard during her junior year. She then attended Radcliffe College and in her first year she took a graduate horticulture class taught by Howard, being allowed to take it because of her science fair project. Her undergraduate advisors included Howard, Richard Schultes, Paul Manglesdorf, and Elso Barghorn.

Simpson graduated with an AB, magna cum laude, from Radcliffe College in 1964. She did not originally think of going to graduate school, as she thought it cost too much money, but changed her mind when she found out otherwise. Because of her excellent undergraduate record she was accepted at Harvard. Her first advisor was Otto Solbrig, but he moved to Michigan. Her next advisor was Reed Rollins. Simpson received her MA in 1967 and her PhD was awarded in 1968.

She stayed at Harvard as a postdoctoral fellow with Otto Solbrig (who had returned to Harvard) until 1970, when she accepted a position as an Assistant Curator of the Gray Herbarium at Harvard. She then moved to the Smithsonian's National Museum of Natural History, Department of Botany, as an Associate Curator from 1972 to 1977 and in 1977 was promoted to Curator. In 1978 she moved to the University of Texas at Austin as a professor. In 1994 she became the C. L. Lundell Professor of Systematic Botany.

Her research was initially in the field of the biogeography of South America but she then moved on to pollination biology. She has also undertaken basic taxonomic research of the Asteracaeae, Krameriaceae, and Fabaceae, contributing to many Floras of North and South America. She is also considered an inspirational teacher of field-work to graduate students.

Her partner is Jack Neff, an expert on bees native to the American Southwest and South America. Together they have two children, Jonathan and Meghan.

== Awards and honors ==
In 2010 Simpson was the ninth recipient of the José Cuatrecasas Medal for Excellence in Tropical Botany from the Department of Botany and the United States National Herbarium of the Smithsonian Institution. She was recognized for her contributions to the study of tropical botany through her monograph of Krameriaceae and revisions of Andean genera and other tropical groups of plants, her mentorship of many students, and as the director of the University of Texas herbaria.

Simpson was awarded the Asa Gray Award of the American Society of Plant Taxonomists (ASPT) in 2003. This is a lifetime achievement award given by to individuals for outstanding accomplishments in research and mentoring.

Simpson is a member of many societies and has served in a number of committees and positions. She has been the President of: In 2001 the Society for Economic Botany, from 1993 to 1994 the American Society of Plant Taxonomists, 1990-1992 the Botanical Society of America, 1984-1986 the Society for the Study of Evolution. She was co-president of the II and III International Congress of Systematic and Evolutionary Biology. She has been a fellow of the American Academy of Arts and Sciences since 1994 and the American Society of Naturalists since 1981. From 1993 to 1995 she was on the board of directors for the American Institute of Biological Sciences. She was on the Board of Governors of the US-Mexico Foundation for Science from 1992 to 2003 and the chairman of the US Committee to the International Union of Biological Sciences from 1986 to 1988.

== Select publications ==
She has co-authored a textbook, Plants in our World: Economic Botany with Molly Conner-Ogorzaly which was first published in 1986 and has been reissued in its fourth edition in 2014. It is considered the leading undergraduate university-level textbook in economic botany.

Among the most significant of her over 120 publications are:

- J Choo, T. Juenger, BB Simpson. 2012. Consequences of frugivore-mediated seed dispersal for the spatial and genetic structures of a Neotropical palm. Molecular Ecology 21, 1019–1031.
- RE Timme, BB Simpson, CR Linder. 2007. High-resolution phylogeny for Helianthus (Asteraceae) using the 18S-26S ribosomal DNA external transcribed spacer. American Journal of Botany 94, 1837–1852.
- A Weeks, DC Daly, BB Simpson. 2005. The phylogenetic history and biogeography of the frankincense and myrrh family (Burseraceae) based on nuclear and chloroplast sequence data. Molecular phylogenetics and evolution 35 (1), 85–101.
- JA Tate, BB Simpson. 2003. Paraphyly of Tarasa (Malvaceae) and diverse origins of the polyploid species. Systematic Botany, 723–737.
- BB Simpson. 1983. Evolution and diversity of floral rewards. in Handbook of experimental pollination biology, 142–159.
- BB Simpson, JL Neff. 1981. Floral rewards: alternatives to pollen and nectar. Annals of the Missouri Botanical Garden, 301–322. doi:10.2307/2398800
- JL Neff, BB Simpson. 1981. Oil-collecting structures in the Anthophoridae (Hymenoptera): morphology, function, and use in systematics. Journal of the Kansas Entomological Society, 95–123.
- BB Simpson. 1979. Quaternary biogeography of the high montane regions of South America. The South American herpetofauna: its origin, evolution, and dispersal 157, 188.
- BB Simpson, J Haffer. 1978. Speciation patterns in the Amazonian forest biota. Annual review of ecology and systematics 9 (1), 497–518.
- BB Simpson. 1975. Pleistocene changes in the flora of the high tropical Andes. Paleobiology 1 (3), 273–294.
- OT Solbrig, BB Simpson. 1974. Components of regulation of a population of dandelions in Michigan. The Journal of Ecology, 473–486.
