= Barbara Pickersgill =

British botanist (born 1940)

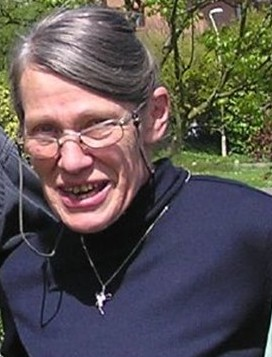
- Pickersgill in 2005
- Born: May 13, 1940
- Scientific career
- Institutions: University of Reading
- Thesis: The Variability and Relationships of Capsicum chinense Jacq. (1966)
- Doctoral advisors: Charles Bixler Heiser

Barbara Pickersgill (born 1940) is a British botanist with a special interest in the domestication of crops, the genetics, taxonomy, and evolutionary biology of cultivated plants, and the preservation of crop diversity.

== Early life and education ==
Pickersgill was born and brought up in Yorkshire. In 1962 she was awarded a degree in Horticultural Botany from the University of Reading. Her 1966 dissertation for the degree of Doctor of Philosophy from Indiana University Bloomington concerned the taxonomy of Capsicum chinense, applying cytogenetics, rather than morphology to delimit species. It was supervised by Charles Bixler Heiser. Her doctoral advisor was Charles B. Heiser.

== Career ==
In 1966 she was appointed as a lecturer in the Department of Agricultural Botany at the University of Reading, from where she retired in 2005, to become an Honorary Research Associate.

When she was awarded the Linnean Medal in 1993 it was noted that she "is well known throughout the world for her distinguished investigations on the genetics, cytology and systematics of the genus Capsicum". As well as investigating the origins of domesticated pepper species she also investigated the origins of other cultivated plants, including Vicia, Psophocarpus, Lens, Cicer, Arachis, Ananas, Gossypium, Ipomoea and Zea. She also carried out collecting expeditions to Peru, Brazil, Belize and Papua New Guinea.

Her research projects include:

- The molecular systematics and the use of wild species in the improvement of farmed chilis (Capsicum)
- Research on the domestication of crops, notably the common bean, Phaseolus vulgaris, working with the Centro Internacional de Agricultura Tropical (CIAT) in Colombia
- The genetic diversity, conservation and improvement of tropical crops such as:
  - Quinoa (Chenopodium quinoa), working with the Centro Internacional de la Papa (CIP) in Peru
  - Banana (Musa species) from the East African Highlands

Her knowledge about Capsicum made her an advisor to Bioversity International about collections of Capsicum held in Brazil and Costa Rica. She advised archaeological work in Peru and Belize about finds of plant materials in the 1970s that led to collaboration about crop origins in later decades.

== Publications ==
Pickersgill was the author or co-author of at least 60 scientific papers and book chapters.

== Honours ==
In 1978 Pickersgill was appointed as a Visiting Professor at the Departments of Agriculture and Biology of the University of Papua New Guinea, Port Moresby. In 1993 the Linnean Society of London presented Pickersgill with the Linnean Medal for her contribution to botany.

In 2000 she was the president of the Society for Economic Botany.

On 4 August 2006 the Linnean Society of London organised a one-day conference in honour of Pickersgill.
