= Nina Etkin =

American anthropologist

- Born: June 13, 1948
- Died: January 26, 2009 (aged 60)
- Education: Washington University in St. Louis
- Known for: Ethnobotany, Economic botany, Ethnopharmacology
- Scientific career
- Fields: Anthropology, Botany

Nina Lilian Etkin (June 13, 1948 – January 26, 2009) was an American anthropologist and biologist. Etkin was noted for her work in medical anthropology, ethnobiology, and ethnopharmacology. She studied the relation between food and health for over thirty years. Her work involved complementary and alternative medicines for prevention and treatment in Hawai‘i; the use of ethnomedicines in Indonesia; and health issues in Nigeria. She won numerous grants and awards from national and international agencies and published several books as well as over 80 professional articles in peer reviewed journals.

== Education and academic career ==
Etkin earned her undergraduate degree in zoology from Indiana University Bloomington in 1970 and her Masters of Arts and PhD in Anthropology in 1972 and 1975 from Washington University in St. Louis, Missouri, both United States.

=== Academic positions ===
- Assistant Professor of Anthropology, University of Minnesota, 1979–1983
- Associate Professor, University of Minnesota, 1983–1990
- Associate Professor of Anthropology, University of Hawaiʻi at Mānoa, 1990–1994
- Full Professor of Anthropology, University of Hawaiʻi at Mānoa, 1994–2009.
- Chair of the Department of Anthropology, University of Hawaiʻi at Mānoa, 2001–2002

She was also a member of the medical faculty of the University of Hawai‘i, United States.

=== Awards and honors ===
Etkin served as Editor in Chief of Economic Botany, the journal of the Society for Economic Botany.

She was a Fellow of the Linnean Society and a past president and honorary board member of the International Society for Ethnopharmacology.

Etkin won the 2009 Distinguished Economic Botanist Award from the Society for Economic Botany.

== Publications ==
=== Books ===
- Plants in Indigenous Medicine & Diet: Biobehavioral Approaches, 1986
- Eating on the Wild Side: The Pharmacologic, Ecologic, and Social Implications of Using Noncultigens, 1994
- Edible Medicines: An Ethnopharmacology of Food, 2006
- Foods of Association: Biocultural Perspectives on Food and Beverages that Mediate Sociability, 2009

== Memorials ==
- The Nina L. Etkin Memorial Fund supports graduate students at the University of Hawaiʻi at Mānoa, “particularly those working in biocultural and medical anthropology”.
- The UHM Campus Arboretum has an Akee tree (Blighia sapida) as a memorial namesake tree dedicated with a plaque; the species chosen reflects her research interest in cultural plant exchanges between Africa and the Caribbean.
- A special issue of the newsletter of the International Society for Ethnopharmacology in 2009 collected testimonials from her students and colleagues.
