= Flora Neotropica =

- Discipline: Botany, plant taxonomy
- Language: English
- Edited by: Thomas A. Zanoni

Publication details
- History: 1967–present
- Publisher: New York Botanical Garden Press (United States)
- Frequency: Irregular

Standard abbreviations
- ISO 4: Flora Neotrop.

Indexing
- CODEN: FLNMAV
- ISSN: 0071-5794
- LCCN: 85647083
- JSTOR: 00715794
- OCLC no.: 1776032

Links
- Journal homepage; Archives (vol. 1–93)

Flora Neotropica is a series of monographs published by the New York Botanical Garden Press, and is the official publication of the Organization for Flora Neotropica. It covers the taxonomic treatment of American plants and plant families in the region of the Tropic of Cancer to the Tropic of Capricorn. The journal is edited by Thomas A. Zanoni (New York Botanical Garden). The journal was established in 1967 and is published on an irregular basis.
