= Ethnobotany of Poland =

The Ethnobotany of Poland has been the subject of several ethnobotanical surveys since the 19th century studying the role of wild plants in Polish folk culture and contemporary rural communities. The first seminar on ethnobotany in Poland was held in Kolbuszowa in 1980 about the role of plants in Polish folk culture and other countries were discussed too.

== Background ==
Poland has been described as an aherbous or herbophobous nation due to greens mostly being consumed only when other foods were unavailable. Moszyński attributed this to good farming conditions in a mostly agrarian culture with limited use for wild plants. According to Moszyński, local populations in Poland were familiar with only a few taxa like Urtica and Chenopodium.

== Surveys ==
The earliest known ethnobotanical survey about Poland was conducted by Józef Rostafiński, who investigated all aspects of ethnobotany including medical, culinary and dyemaking. He asked participants about green vegetables (Zieleniny): "Do local people gather herbs in spring to use in soups, particularly in famine years, and these herbs are?" The responses he received included Urtica (pokrzywa żegawka), Glechoma (Bluszczyk kurdybanek), Rumex (szczaw), Heracleum, and Aegopodium podagraria.

Green vegetables from around 58 taxa (43 genera) appear but half are only used when food is scarce. Sorrel is among the most common, with data from 1948 describing the preservation of leaves for the winter. Chenopodium and Atriplex species were eaten fried, blanched or boiled, mixed with potatoes or dairy. The perception of survey respondents was generally that it was a wartime food or mostly eaten by the poor, and its consumption is rare in modern times.
