= Cassandra Quave =

American ethnobotanist, herbarium curator

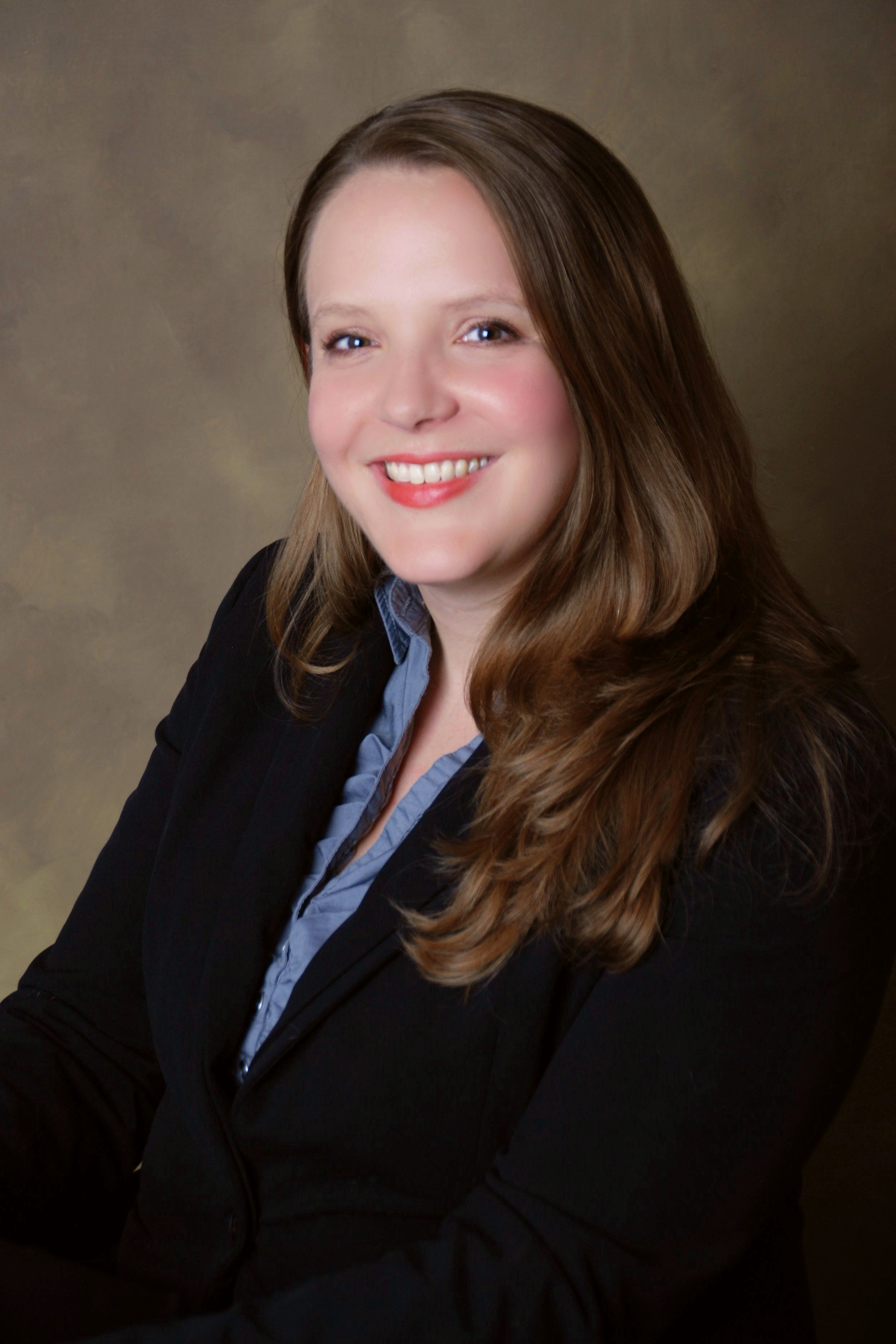
- Born: June 2, 1978; Arcadia, Florida
- Citizenship: United States of America
- Education: Emory University (BS); Florida International University (PhD)
- Children: 4
- Scientific career
- Fields: Ethnobotany
- Workplaces: Emory University School of Medicine; Emory University
- Thesis: An ethnopharmacological approach to multidrug -resistant Staphylococcus aureus: Evaluation of Italian plants used in the traditional healing of skin disease (2008)
- Doctoral advisor: Dr. Bradley C. Bennett
- Website: www.etnobotanica.us

Cassandra Leah Quave (born June 2, 1978) is an American ethnobotanist, herbarium curator, and associate professor at Emory University. Her research focuses on analyzing natural, plant-based medicine of indigenous cultures to help combat infectious disease and antibiotic resistance. In particular, she studies bacterial biofilm inhibition and quorum-sensing inhibition of botanical extracts for inflammatory skin conditions.

== Early life and education ==
=== Childhood ===
Born in Arcadia, Florida, Quave's interest in science and medicine began early, stemming from the extended time she spent in hospitals. At age three, congenital birth defects prompted an amputation below the knee in her right leg. After surgery, she required follow-up treatment for complications from an MRSA (Methicillin-resistant Staphylococcus aureus) infection. This experience would provide the basis of her adolescent science fair project about drug resistance in Escherichia coli, as well as her later research projects.

=== Undergraduate education ===
In her undergraduate years at Emory University, she pursued a double bachelor's of science in Human Biology as well as Anthropology, which she earned in 2000. A college course in tropical ecology coupled with trips to Peru shifted her interest from medical school to instead pursuing a PhD through researching ethnobotany. In Peru, she saw the work of a traditional medicine man on children with parasitic worm infections in villages without access to pharmaceutical drugs. To her, the encounter illustrated how modern Western medicine has undermined the usefulness of traditional medicine.

=== Doctoral education ===
After earning her bachelor's degrees, Quave started her ethnobotany fieldwork in southern Italy between 2001 and 2003, before pursuing a doctoral program in biology at Florida International University. Under Dr. Bradley C. Bennett's guidance, she completed her doctoral dissertation in 2008, titled "An ethnopharmacological approach to multidrug-resistant Staphylococcus aureas: Evaluation of Italian Plants used in the Traditional Healing of Skin Disease."

=== Post-doctoral fellowships ===
Quave completed her first post-doctoral fellowship in microbial pathogenesis at the University of Arkansas for Medical Sciences between 2009 and 2011. Specifically, she continued her study of medicinal plants in Italy, focusing on anti-biofilm properties in MRSA. Additionally, Quave completed a second post-doctoral teaching fellowship between 2011 and 2012 with the Emory University Center for Human Health.

== Research contributions ==
=== Bacterial biofilm inhibition ===
The defensive mechanism of bacterial biofilms in resisting antimicrobial drugs comes from the ability of microbes to develop and hide within a protective extracellular matrix. Quave's work during her first post-doctoral fellowship focused on the significant biofilm-inhibiting activity of 10 individual botanical extracts from unique species of plants, something she believes could be utilized in new drug therapies. Since then, one of her current research projects focuses on finding the specific compounds in the elmleaf blackberry plant (Rubus ulmifolius) that contribute to the property. In doing so, Quave hopes to translate the biofilm inhibiting extracts into a wound management device such as bandages.

=== Quorum-sensing inhibition ===
Another major project of Quave's has been studying quorum-sensing inhibiting (QSI) activity in medicinal plants that prevent bacterial cells from effectively communicating, colonizing, and releasing toxins. Her focus has been upon both the Brazilian pepper tree extracts (Schinus terebinthifolia) and the European chestnut (Castanea sativa). According to Quave, these QSI extracts could help in the treatment of atopic dermatitis. However, she acknowledges a number of difficulties of the drug development process. Aside from receiving FDA approval, there are the added difficulties of isolating the active compound and understanding the complex pharmacology of multiple extracts, if pursuing a mixture for increased efficacy.

== Selected publications ==
=== Books ===
In 2021, Quave published "The Plant Hunter", a memoir focused on searching for plants with medicinal potential.

=== Academic research ===
- Khan, Muhammad Faraz; Tang, Huaqiao; Lyles, James T.; Pineau, Rozenn; Mashwani, Zia-ur-Rahman; Quave, Cassandra L. (2018). "Antibacterial Properties of Medicinal Plants From Pakistan Against Multidrug-Resistant ESKAPE Pathogens". Frontiers in Pharmacology. 9 815. doi:10.3389/fphar.2018.00815. ISSN 1663-9812. PMC 6082950. PMID 30116190.
- Muhs, Amelia; Lyles, James T.; Parlet, Corey P.; Nelson, Kate; Kavanaugh, Jeffery S.; Horswill, Alexander R.; Quave, Cassandra L. (2017-02-10). "Virulence Inhibitors from Brazilian Peppertree Block Quorum Sensing and Abate Dermonecrosis in Skin Infection Models". Scientific Reports. 7 (1) 42275. Bibcode:2017NatSR...742275M. doi:10.1038/srep42275. ISSN 2045-2322. PMC 5301492. PMID 28186134.
- Lyles, James T.; Kim, Austin; Nelson, Kate; Bullard-Roberts, Angelle L.; Hajdari, Avni; Mustafa, Behxhet; Quave, Cassandra L. (2017). "The Chemical and Antibacterial Evaluation of St. John's Wort Oil Macerates Used in Kosovar Traditional Medicine". Frontiers in Microbiology. 8 1639. doi:10.3389/fmicb.2017.01639. ISSN 1664-302X. PMC 5596533. PMID 28943862.
- Quave, Cassandra L.; Lyles, James T.; Kavanaugh, Jeffery S.; Nelson, Kate; Parlet, Corey P.; Crosby, Heidi A.; Heilmann, Kristopher P.; Horswill, Alexander R. (2015-08-21). "Castanea sativa (European Chestnut) Leaf Extracts Rich in Ursene and Oleanene Derivatives Block Staphylococcus aureus Virulence and Pathogenesis without Detectable Resistance". PLOS ONE. 10 (8) e0136486. Bibcode:2015PLoSO..1036486Q. doi:10.1371/journal.pone.0136486. ISSN 1932-6203. PMC 4546677. PMID 26295163.
- Quave, Cassandra L.; Plano, Lisa R. W.; Bennett, Bradley C. (2011). "Quorum sensing inhibitors of Staphylococcus aureus from Italian medicinal plants". Planta Medica. 77 (2): 188–195. Bibcode:2011PlMed..77..188Q. doi:10.1055/s-0030-1250145. ISSN 1439-0221. PMC 3022964. PMID 20645243.
- Quave, Cassandra L.; Plano, Lisa R.W.; Pantuso, Traci; Bennett, Bradley C. (2008). "Effects of extracts from Italian medicinal plants on planktonic growth, biofilm formation and adherence of methicillin-resistant Staphylococcus aureus". Journal of Ethnopharmacology. 118 (3): 418–428. doi:10.1016/j.jep.2008.05.005. ISSN 0378-8741. PMC 2553885. PMID 18556162.
