= Gail E. Wagner =

American paleoethnobotanist (1953–2024)

- Born: February 27, 1953; Dayton, Ohio, U.S.
- Died: November 20, 2024 (aged 71)
- Occupation: Paleoethnobotanist

Academic background
- Education: Washington University in St. Louis

Academic work
- Discipline: Anthropology
- Institutions: University of South Carolina

Gail E. Wagner (February 27, 1953 – November 20, 2024) was an American paleoethnobotanist.

== Life and career ==
Wagner was born in Dayton, Ohio.

She obtained a bachelor's degree from Miami University. She earned master's and doctorate degrees in anthropology from Washington University. Wagner taught at the University of South Carolina for 32 years, from 1989 to 2021. She also served as president of the Society for Ethnobotany.

== Awards ==
In 2019, Wagner received the Distinguished Ethnobiologist Award by the Society of Ethnobiology. In 2022, Wagner was awarded the South Carolina Governor's Award in Humanities.

== Selected publications ==
- Wagner, Gail Elaine (1987). Uses of plants by the Fort Ancient Indians.
