= John William Harshberger =

American botanist (1869–1929)

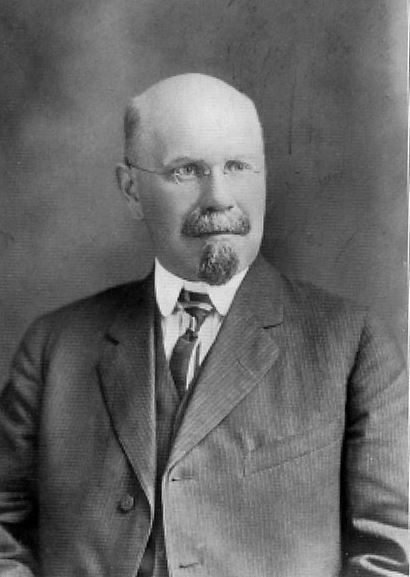
John William Harshberger

John William Harshberger (January 1, 1869 – April 27, 1929) was an American botanist who specialized in plant geography, ecology and plant pathology. He taught at the University of Pennsylvania for more than 35 years. He was an ardent plant conservationist and he is credited with coining the term "ethnobotany".

== Biography ==
Harshberger was born January 1, 1869, in Philadelphia, the son of Abram Harshberger and Jane Harris Walk Harshberger. His father was a physician and Civil War veteran. He became interested in plants as a young child and made a small herbarium at age seven. He graduated from Central High School and entered the University of Pennsylvania in 1888. During the summer of 1890 he studied at the Arnold Arboretum of Harvard University. Harshberger received his bachelor's degree in 1892 and a doctorate in 1893. His doctorate thesis, "Maize: a Botanical and Economic Study", asserted that maize evolved from teosinte, a Mexican grass; his theory has since been widely accepted.

In 1893 Harshberger was hired as an instructor of botany, biology, and zoology at the University of Pennsylvania. He was made an assistant professor in botany in 1907 and promoted to full professor in 1911, a position he held for the rest of his life. In addition to his duties at the University, Harshberger taught nature studies at Pocono Pines Assembly, a summer school program patterned after the Chautauqua adult education movement. He was also the head professor of ecology at the Marine Biological Laboratory in Cold Springs Harbor from 1913 to 1922. In 1907 he married Helen B. Cole from Trenton, New Jersey; they had two daughters.

During his career, Harshberger made notable contributions across a wide variety of botanical topics. He performed outstanding research work in mycology and plant pathology and was one of the first to recognize the threat posed by the chestnut-blight fungus. He also did work in the areas of economic botany, plant geography, conservation, ecology, and floristics. His most significant contribution was probably the monumental Phytographic Survey of North America (1911, 800 pages), an early attempt to classify and map plant communities in North America. It was considered an impressive accomplishment for one botanist to synthesize all the floristic and vegetative literature for North America. He also wrote the popular and influential, Vegetation of the New Jersey Pine-Barrens, which described the unique area in a manner accessible to the public and brought attention to its importance in conservation.

Harshberger traveled widely to study and collect plants. He did botanical work throughout most of the United States and also traveled internationally to botanize in Mexico (1896), the West Indies (1901), Europe (1898, 1907 and 1923), South America (1927) and northern Africa (1928). He was a member of more than 25 scientific and conservation organizations, including the American Association for the Advancement of Science, the American Philosophical Society, the Botanical Society of America, and the American Forestry Association. During the last ten years of his life he was an active participant in the Wildflower Preservation Society and other groups concerned with conservation and nature preservation.

Harshberger died of a heart attack on April 27, 1929, in Philadelphia. He is buried in the West Laurel Hill Cemetery, Bala Cynwyd, Pennsylvania.

== Publications ==
Harshberger authored more than 300 papers covering a wide variety of topics. Some of his most notable titles include:

- The Botanists of Philadelphia and Their Work (1899)
- A Phytogeographic Survey of North America (1911)
- The Vegetation of South Florida (1914)
- The Vegetation of the New Jersey Pine Barrens (1916)
- A Textbook of Mycology and Plant Pathology (1917)
- Colored Wall Map Vegetation of North America (1919)
- A Textbook of Pastoral and Agricultural Botany (1920)

The standard author abbreviation Harshb. is used to indicate this person as the author when citing a botanical name.
