= W. Hardy Eshbaugh =

William Hardy Eshbaugh III (born May 1, 1936 in Montclair, New Jersey) is Professor Emeritus of Botany at Miami University, known primarily for his research on chili peppers and one of three authors of the seminal work covering the flora and biogeography of the Bahamas.

== Early life ==
Eshbaugh earned a BA in Botany at Cornell University, and continued his education under Charles B. Heiser at Indiana University Bloomington, where he earned his master's degree and Ph.D.

== Career ==
Eshbaugh is perhaps best known for his research on the genus Capsicum (peppers), including the discovery and description of a new species, Capsicum tovarii. As a result of his research in peppers, Gloria Barboza named a pepper plant after Eshbaugh, Capsicum eshbaughii. Eshbaugh served as the Curator of the Willard Sherman Turrell Herbarium from 1967 to 1968, 1978-1982 and 1989–1993. He has had many notable graduate students work under him over the years, including Charles Werth. Eshbaugh has published over 120 scientific papers.

== Awards and honors ==
- Albert Nelson Marquis Lifetime Achievement, 2019, by "Marquis Who's Who.
- Peter H. Raven Award, 2008, "for exceptional efforts at outreach to non-scientists."
- Society for Economic Botany Award as Distinguished Economic Botanist, 2007.
- National Science Foundation Cooperative Fellow, 1962–63
- American Association for the Advancement of Science, Elected Fellow, 1990
- Botanical Society of America, Certificate of Merit, August, 1992 "Inspiring and caring teacher, dedicated researcher, able administrator, president of the American Society of Plant Taxonomists, the Botanical Society of America, and the Society for Economic Botany, champion of the science of botany."
- The Great Egret Award, National Audubon Society, February 2005, in recognition of a lifetime of service to the cause of conservation at the national, state and local levels.
- United States Army Commendation Medal for Excellence in Research, 1965.
