= Lucinda A. McDade =

American botanist and plant collector (born 1953)

- Born: 3 December 1953 (age 72)
- Citizenship: American
- Education: Newcomb College of Tulane University (B.S. in Biology), Duke University (Ph.D. in Botany/Zoology)
- Occupations: Botanist and Plant collector
- Known for: Study of Acanthaceae
- Notable work: conservation biology Described at least sixteen species, and has gathered around 600 specimens
- Awards: Asa Gray Award by the American Society of Plant Taxonomists

Dr. Lucinda A. McDade (born 3 December 1953) is an American botanist and plant collector who is noted for her study of Acanthaceae and her work in conservation biology. She received her B.S. in Biology from Newcomb College of Tulane University, and her Ph.D. in Botany/Zoology from Duke University.

She has been president of the American Society of Plant Taxonomists and Association of Tropical Biology. In 2019 she was awarded the Asa Gray Award by the American Society of Plant Taxonomists.

She has described at least sixteen species, and has gathered around 600 specimens, many from Central and South America. The standard author abbreviation McDade is used to indicate this person as the author when citing a botanical name.

== Works ==
- McDade, Lucinda A (1994). La selva: ecology and natural history of a neotropical rain forest. University of Chicago Press. ISBN 9780226039527. OCLC 758187502.
- De Groot, Sarah J; Ashworth, Vanessa; Friar, Elizabeth; McDade, Lucinda A (2009). A conservation plan for Berberis harrisoniana (Kofa Mountain barberry, Berberidaceae). Rancho Santa Ana Botanic Garden. ISBN 9780960580880. OCLC 310982922.
- McGlaughlin, Mitchell E; Ashworth, Vanessa; Friar, Elizabeth; McDade, Lucinda A (2008). A conservation plan for Mecca aster, Xylorhiza cognata (Asteraceae). Rancho Santa Ana Botanic Garden. OCLC 300318858.
- Fraga, Naomi S; Ashworth, Vanessa; McDade, Lucinda A (2007). A conservation plan for Mimulus shevockii (Phrymaceae). Rancho Santa Ana Botanic Garden. OCLC 300312424.
