= Keewaydinoquay Peschel =

American herbalist and author from Michigan, U.S. (1919–1999)

- Born: Margaret Moorhouse Cook; 1918; Ludington, Michigan
- Died: July 21, 1999 (aged 80–81); Leland, Michigan
- Citizenship: American
- Occupations: herbalist, author
- Known for: ethnobotany
- Spouse: Gerhard Peschel

Keewaydinoquay Pakawakuk Peschel (1918–July 21, 1999) was a scholar, ethnobotanist, herbalist, teacher, and author from Michigan.

== Early life ==
Margaret Moorhouse Cook was born in 1918 in Ludington, Michigan. She identified as being Ojibwe.

Keewaydinoquay wrote in her biography that she was born in a fishing boat en route to the hospital from the Manitou Islands, which capsized shortly thereafter, and her survival was interpreted as miraculous. Her childhood name, meaning "Walks with Bears", derived from an incident where as a toddler she was left on a blanket as her parents gathered blueberries, returning to see her standing by bears, eating blueberries off the bushes.

Her adult name Giiwedinokwe, recorded as "Keewaydinoquay", means "Woman of the North[west Wind]" and came from her vision quest.

Cook said that in school she "called herself Zhatay and the next day, Keewaydinoquay." She said her family surname was Pakawakuk. She took the surname Peschel when she married Gerhard Peschel. Her three children were named Wah-ee-ayakah, Olyndahnan, and Wasahmapohl.

== Ethnobotany and education ==
Peschel said that she apprenticed with an Anishinaabe medicine woman Nodjimahkwe beginning at age of 9. Peschel studied education and taught science while raising her children. At the age of 57, she decided to further her education, realizing that people would listen to her more if she had a more advanced degree. She received a Master of Education Degree from Wayne State University and finished all coursework for a Ph.D. in ethnobotany at the University of Michigan.

== Career ==
She was awarded the Michigan Conservation Teacher of the Year in 1975 for her "Outstanding Work in the Field of Conservation". In the 1980s, she was a lecturer at the University of Wisconsin-Milwaukee and taught classes in ethnobotany and philosophy of the Great Lakes American Indians. She was consulted for many books, including several on Great Lakes Indigenous plant use.

She lived in Ann Arbor, Milwaukee, Leland, and Garden Island. She wrote many books on herbs, Native American medicine, and Native American legends for children and adults.

Keewaydinoquay founded the Miniss Kitigan Drum. In 1990, Miniss Kitigan Drum became a nonprofit organization, based in Milwaukee, Wisconsin with Lynn Simonsen Noel as its principal officer. In 1985, Keewaydinoquay and Miniss Kitigan Drum were under investigation by the sheriff of Charlevoix County, Michigan, due to the death of one of the group’s members during a “vision quest”, which involved a three-day fast and sessions in a sweat lodge, on Michigan's Garden Island. The death was deemed accidental, and no charges were filed.

== Death and legacy ==
Peschel died on July 21, 1999, in Leland, Michigan. Her memorial service took place in the Traverse City Chapel at Covell Funeral Homes in Traverse City, Michigan.

University of Michigan Press published her autobiography, Keewaydinoquay: Stories from My Youth, edited by Lee Boisvert in 2006. Lee Boisvert also edited Cedar Songs, an autobiography about her adult life, released by Trafford Publishing in 2013.

== Publications ==
Puhpohwee for the People: Anarrative account of some uses of Fungi among the Ahnishinaubeg by Keewaydinoquay, Botanical Museum of Harvard University, February 1978

- Peschel, Keewaydinoquay M. (1987) "Dear Grandfathers", excerpt from Truth Is Stranger
- Peschel, Keewaydinoquay M. (1998) Puhpohwee for the People: a narrative account of some uses of fungi among the Ahnishinaabeg
- Peschel, Keewaydinoquay M. (1979) "Directions We Know: Walk in Honor" in Miniss Kitigan Drum, Garden Island, MI
- Peschel, Keewaydinoquay. (1978) Jawendamowin Nah: Happiness in the Half-World?/My Reverend Grandfather Challenges Coprinus Atramentarius. Botanical Museum of Harvard University.
- Peschel, Keewaydinoquay. "The Legend of Miskwedo". Journal of Psychedelic Drugs, 11(1-2):29-31, January–June 1979.
- Peschel, Keewaydinoquay M. (2006) Stories from my Youth. University of Michigan Press
- Peschel, Keewaydinoquay "Nkomis" (1977) Mukwah Miskomin or KinnickKinnick "Gift of Bear". Miniss Kitigan Drum, Garden Island, MI
- Peschel, Keewaydinoquay "Nkomis" (1978) Min: Anishinabag Ogimaawi-minan / Blueberry: First Fruit of the People. Miniss Kitigan Drum, Garden Island, MI

== See also ==
- Pharmacognosy
- Botany
