= Journal of Ethnopharmacology =

- Discipline: Ethnopharmacology
- Language: English
- Edited by: A.M. Viljoen

Publication details
- History: 1979–present
- Publisher: Elsevier
- Frequency: 18/year
- Impact factor: 4.360 (2020)

Standard abbreviations
- ISO 4: J. Ethnopharmacol.

Indexing
- CODEN: JOETD7
- ISSN: 0378-8741 (print); 1872-7573 (web)
- OCLC no.: 04649997

Links
- Journal homepage; Online access

The Journal of Ethnopharmacology is a peer-reviewed medical journal covering the traditional medicinal use of plants and other substances. It is the official journal of the International Society for Ethnopharmacology. The journal is included in the Index Medicus (MEDLINE).
