= Norman Farnsworth =

American pharmacologist & ethnopharmacologist (1930 - 2011)

Norman R. Farnsworth
- Born: March 23, 1930; Lynn, Massachusetts, U.S.
- Died: September 10, 2011 (aged 81); Chicago, Illinois, U.S.
- Education: Massachusetts College of Pharmacy and Health Sciences B.Sc. Pharmacy, 1953; Massachusetts College of Pharmacy and Health Sciences M.Sc. Pharmacy, 1955; University of Pittsburgh School of Pharmacy Ph.D. Pharmacognosy, 1959
- Spouse: Priscilla Marston Farnsworth
- Military career
- Allegiance: United States
- Branch: United States Army
- Service years: 1950–1951
- Rank: Corporal
- Units: Third Infantry Division, Seventh Regimental Combat Team
- Conflict: Korean War: Battle of the Chosin Reservoir; Chinese Communist Forces Intervention; First United Nations Counteroffensive; Chinese Communist Forces Spring Offensive
- Awards: Bronze Star (5); Combat Medical Badge; Korean Ribbon with Four Battle Stars
- Website: napralert.org/nrf/

Norman Robert Farnsworth (March 23, 1930 – September 20, 2011) was a pharmacognosist, professor, and author.

== Early life and education ==
He received his bachelor's in 1953 and master's in 1955 in pharmacy at the Massachusetts College of Pharmacy, and his Ph.D. in Pharmacognosy from the University of Pittsburgh School of Pharmacy in 1959, where he helped establish the Pharmacognosy Department, became its first chair, and taught until 1970.

== Military service ==
An army veteran of the Korean War, Farnsworth served as a Private First Class and eventually as a Corporal in the Third Infantry Division, Seventh Regimental Combat Team, nicknamed the "Fire Brigade" in Korea. He was seriously wounded in the winter of 1950. Because of his service during the Battle of the Chosin Reservoir, he received the Bronze Star Medal with a "V" device, which is the U. S. military's fourth-highest award for valor. He was also awarded four oak leaf clusters, representative of four additional awards of the Bronze Star medal, the Combat Medical Badge, and the Korean Ribbon with Four Battle Stars.

== Career ==
He was a founding member of the American Society of Pharmacognosy in 1959. He was also the founding director of the Program for Collaborative Research in the Pharmaceutical Sciences at University of Illinois at Chicago.

From 1970 to 1982, he was the head of the Department of Pharmacognosy and Pharmacology at the University of Illinois at Chicago.

In 1974, he traveled to China with the American Herbal Pharmacology Delegation, where they studied the practice of traditional Chinese herbal medicine. Afterwards, the National Academy of Sciences published "Herbal Pharmacology in the People’s Republic of China."

When computers were first coming onto the scene, Farnsworth created Natural Products Alert (NAPRALERT) in 1975. The NAPRALERT database was the first computerized collection on the research and science of natural products.

Farnsworth was a member of the World Health Organization (WHO) Expert Advisory Panel on Traditional Medicine. He was also the director of the WHO Collaborating Center for Traditional Medicine Programme at UIC's College of Pharmacy.

A pioneer in the field of pharmacognosy, Dr. Farnsworth was an honorary member of the American Society of Pharmacognosy, an honorary member of the Society for Economic botany, an honorary member of the International Society for Ethnopharmacology, an honorary member of the French Pharmacognosy Society, and a member of the Japanese Society of Pharmacognosy. He also received three honorary doctorates from University of Paris V (René Descartes), Uppsala University in Sweden, and his alma mater, the Massachusetts College of Pharmacy and Allied Sciences.

In 2005, the American Society of Pharmacognosy awarded him their Research Achievement Award.
