= Ethnobotany =

Study of traditional plant use

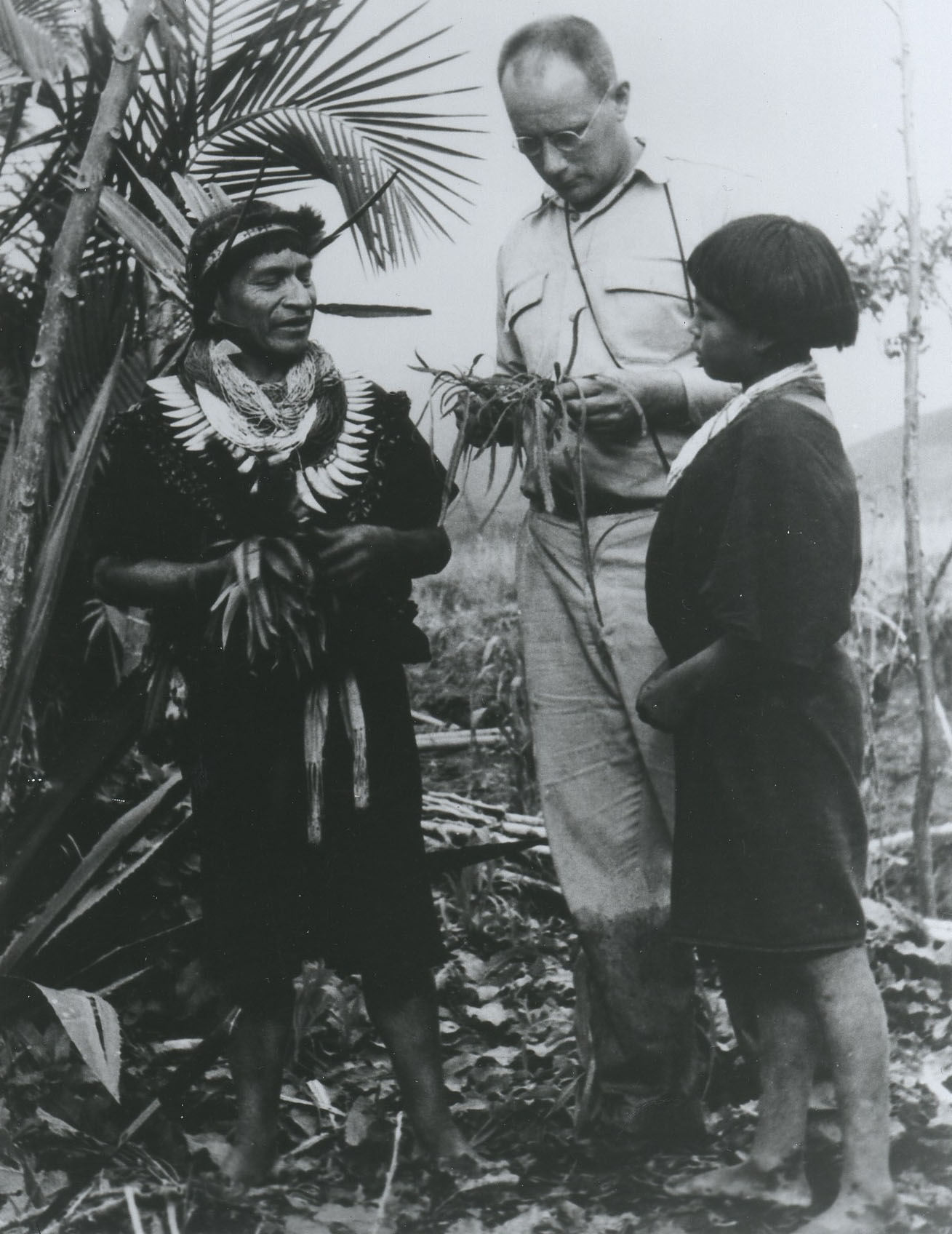
Ethnobotanist Richard Evans Schultes at work in the Amazon in the 1940s

Ethnobotany is an interdisciplinary field at the interface of natural and social sciences that studies the relationships between humans and plants. It focuses on traditional knowledge of how plants are used, managed, and perceived in human societies. Ethnobotany integrates knowledge from botany, anthropology, ecology, and chemistry to study plant-related customs across cultures. Researchers in this field document and analyze how different societies use local flora for various purposes, including medicine, food, religious use, intoxicants, building materials, fuels and clothing. Richard Evans Schultes, often referred to as the "father of ethnobotany", provided an early definition of the discipline:

Ethnobotany simply means investigating plants used by primitive societies in various parts of the world.

Since Schultes' time, ethnobotany has evolved from primarily documenting traditional plant knowledge to applying this information in modern contexts, particularly in pharmaceutical development. Recent research has also used large historical pharmacopeias as sources for drug discovery. A 2026 study analyzed more than 41,000 traditional Chinese medical recipes. It combined this dataset with nuclear receptor profiling to identify plant fractions capable of modulating glucocorticoid receptor activity, demonstrating how ethnobotanical knowledge can inform modern pharmacological research. The field now addresses complex issues such as intellectual property rights and equitable benefit-sharing arrangements arising from the use of traditional knowledge.

== History ==
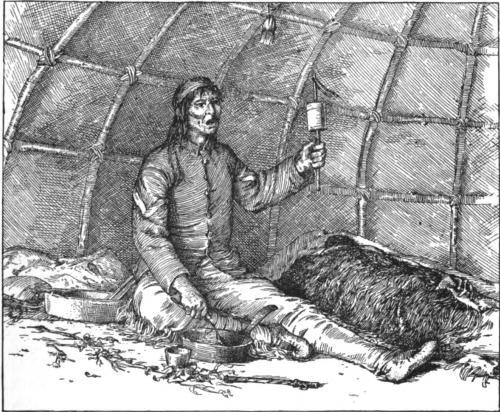
Plants have been widely used by Native American healers, such as this Ojibwa man.

The idea of ethnobotany was first proposed by the early 20th century botanist John William Harshberger. While Harshberger did perform ethnobotanical research extensively, including in areas such as North Africa, Mexico, Scandinavia, and Pennsylvania, it was not until Richard Evans Schultes began his trips into the Amazon that ethnobotany became a more well known science. However, the practice of ethnobotany is thought to have much earlier origins in the first century AD when a Greek physician by the name of Pedanius Dioscorides wrote an extensive botanical text detailing the medical and culinary properties of "over 600 mediterranean plants" named De Materia Medica. Historians note that Dioscorides wrote about traveling often throughout the Roman empire, including regions such as "Greece, Crete, Egypt, and Petra", and in doing so obtained substantial knowledge about the local plants and their useful properties. European botanical knowledge drastically expanded once the New World was discovered due to ethnobotany. This expansion in knowledge can primarily be attributed to the substantial influx of new plants from the Americas, including crops such as potatoes, peanuts, avocados, and tomatoes. The French explorer Jacques Cartier learned a cure for scurvy (a tea made from the needles of a coniferous tree, likely spruce) from a local Iroquois tribe.

== Medieval and Renaissance ==
During the medieval period, ethnobotanical studies were often conducted in connection with monasticism. However, most botanical knowledge was kept in gardens, such as physic gardens attached to hospitals and religious buildings. It was thought of in practical use terms for culinary and medical purposes and the ethnographic element was not studied as a modern anthropologist might approach ethnobotany today.

== Age of Reason ==
In 1732, Carl Linnaeus carried out a research expedition in Scandinavia asking the Sami people about their ethnological usage of plants.

The Age of Enlightenment saw a rise in economic botanical exploration. Alexander von Humboldt collected data from the New World, and James Cook's voyages brought back collections and information on plants from the South Pacific. At this time major botanical gardens were started, for instance the Royal Botanic Gardens, Kew in 1759. The directors of the gardens sent out gardener-botanist explorers to care for and collect plants to add to their collections.

As the 18th century became the 19th, ethnobotany saw expeditions undertaken with more colonial aims rather than trade economics such as that of Lewis and Clarke which recorded both plants and the peoples encountered use of them. Edward Palmer collected material culture artifacts and botanical specimens from people in the North American West (Great Basin) and Mexico from the 1860s to the 1890s. Through all of this research, the field of "aboriginal botany" was established—the study of all forms of the vegetable world which aboriginal peoples use for food, medicine, textiles, ornaments and more.

== Development and application in modern science ==
The first individual to study the emic perspective of the plant world was a German physician working in Sarajevo at the end of the 19th century: Leopold Glück. His published work on traditional medical uses of plants done by rural people in Bosnia (1896) has to be considered the first modern ethnobotanical work.

Other scholars analyzed uses of plants under an indigenous/local perspective in the 20th century: Matilda Coxe Stevenson, Zuni plants (1915); Frank Cushing, Zuni foods (1920); Keewaydinoquay Peschel, Anishinaabe fungi (1998), and the team approach of Wilfred Robbins, John Peabody Harrington, and Barbara Freire-Marreco, Tewa pueblo plants (1916).

In the beginning, ethnobotanical specimens and studies were not very reliable and sometimes not helpful. This is because the botanists and the anthropologists did not always collaborate in their work. The botanists focused on identifying species and how the plants were used instead of concentrating upon how plants fit into people's lives. On the other hand, anthropologists were interested in the cultural role of plants and treated other scientific aspects superficially. In the early 20th century, botanists and anthropologists better collaborated and the collection of reliable, detailed cross-disciplinary data began.

Beginning in the 20th century, the field of ethnobotany experienced a shift from the raw compilation of data to a greater methodological and conceptual reorientation. This is also the beginning of academic ethnobotany. The so-called "father" of this discipline is Richard Evans Schultes, even though he did not actually coin the term "ethnobotany". Today the field of ethnobotany requires a variety of skills: botanical training for the identification and preservation of plant specimens; anthropological training to understand the cultural concepts around the perception of plants; linguistic training, at least enough to transcribe local terms and understand native morphology, syntax, and semantics.

Mark Plotkin, who studied at Harvard University, the Yale School of Forestry and Tufts University, has contributed a number of books on ethnobotany. He completed a handbook for the Tirio people of Suriname detailing their medicinal plants; Tales of a Shaman's Apprentice (1994); The Shaman's Apprentice, a children's book with Lynne Cherry (1998); and Medicine Quest: In Search of Nature's Healing Secrets (2000).

Plotkin was interviewed in 1998 by South American Explorer magazine, just after the release of Tales of a Shaman's Apprentice and the IMAX movie Amazonia. In the book, he stated that he saw wisdom in both traditional and Western forms of medicine:

No medical system has all the answers—no shaman that I've worked with has the equivalent of a polio vaccine and no dermatologist that I've been to could cure a fungal infection as effectively (and inexpensively) as some of my Amazonian mentors. It shouldn't be the doctor versus the witch doctor. It should be the best aspects of all medical systems (ayurvedic, herbalism, homeopathic, and so on) combined in a way which makes health care more effective and more affordable for all.

A great deal of information about the traditional uses of plants is still intact with tribal peoples. But the native healers are often reluctant to accurately share their knowledge to outsiders. Schultes actually apprenticed himself to an Amazonian shaman, which involves a long-term commitment and genuine relationship. In Wind in the Blood: Mayan Healing & Chinese Medicine by Garcia et al. the visiting acupuncturists were able to access levels of Mayan medicine that anthropologists could not because they had something to share in exchange. Cherokee medicine priest David Winston describes how his uncle would invent nonsense to satisfy visiting anthropologists.

Another scholar, James W. Herrick, who studied under ethnologist William N. Fenton, in his work Iroquois Medical Ethnobotany (1995) with Dean R. Snow (editor), professor of Anthropology at Penn State, explains that understanding herbal medicines in traditional Iroquois cultures is rooted in a strong and ancient cosmological belief system. Their work provides perceptions and conceptions of illness and imbalances which can manifest in physical forms from benign maladies to serious diseases. It also includes a large compilation of Herrick's field work from numerous Iroquois authorities of over 450 names, uses, and preparations of plants for various ailments. Traditional Iroquois practitioners had (and have) a sophisticated perspective on the plant world that contrast strikingly with that of modern medical science.

Researcher Cassandra Quave at Emory University has used ethnobotany to address the problems that arise from antibiotic resistance. Quave notes that the advantage of medical ethnobotany over Western medicine rests in the difference in mechanism. For example, elmleaf blackberry extract focuses instead on the prevention of bacterial collaboration as opposed to directly exterminating them.

== Issues ==
Many instances of gender bias have occurred in ethnobotany, creating the risk of drawing erroneous conclusions. Anthropologists would often consult with primarily men. In Las Pavas, a small farming community in Panama, anthropologists drew conclusions about the entire community's use of plant from their conversations and lessons with mostly men. They consulted with 40 families, but the women only participated rarely in interviews and never joined them in the field. Due to the division of labor, the knowledge of wild plants for food, medicine, and fibers, among others, was left out of the picture, resulting in a distorted view of which plants were actually important to them.

Ethnobotanists have also assumed that ownership of a resource means familiarity with that resource. In some societies women are excluded from owning land, while being the ones who work it. Inaccurate data can come from interviewing only the owners.

Other issues include ethical concerns regarding interactions with indigenous populations, and the International Society of Ethnobiology has created a code of ethics to guide researchers.

== Scientific journals ==
- Journal of Ethnobiology and Ethnomedicine
- Economic Botany
- Ethnobotany Research and Application
- Journal of Ethnopharmacology
- Indian Journal of Traditional Knowledge (IJTK)
- Latin American and Caribbean Bulletin of Medicinal and Aromatic Plants

== See also ==
- Society for Ethnobotany
- Agroecology
- Anthropology
- Botany
- Economic botany
- Ethnobiology
- Ethnomedicine
- Ethnomycology
- History of plant systematics
- Ethnobotany of Poland
- Medical ethnobotany of India
- List of ethnobotanists
- Non-timber forest product
- Phytogeography
- Plant Resources of Tropical Africa
- Plants in culture
- The Encyclopedia of Psychoactive Plants
- Traditional ecological knowledge
