= Economic Botany =

Ethnobotany and Economic Botany
- Discipline: Botany
- Language: English
- Edited by: Ina Vandebroek

Publication details
- Former name: Economic Botany
- History: 1947-present
- Publisher: Springer Science+Business Media and the New York Botanical Garden Press on behalf of the Society for Ethnobotany
- Frequency: Quarterly
- Open access: Hybrid
- Impact factor: (2025)

Standard abbreviations
- ISO 4: Econ. Bot.

Indexing
- CODEN: ECBOA5
- ISSN: 0013-0001 (print); 1874-9364 (web)
- LCCN: 50031790
- JSTOR: 00130001
- OCLC no.: 645333783

Links
- Journal homepage; Online archive

Ethnobotany and Economic Botany is a quarterly peer-reviewed academic journal that covers all aspects of economic botany. The editor-in-chief is Ina Vandebroek. The journal was established in 1947 and is published by Springer Science+Business Media and the New York Botanical Garden Press on behalf of the Society for Ethnobotany. Authors have a choice to publish articles under the traditional subscription model or an open access model.

== Abstracting and indexing ==
The journal is abstracted and indexed in:

- AGRICOLA
- Biological Abstracts
- BIOSIS Previews
- Chemical Abstracts Service
- Current Contents/Agriculture, Biology & Environmental Sciences
- EBSCO databases
- Elsevier Biobase
- EMBiology
- Global Health
- MLA International Bibliography
- PASCAL
- Science Citation Index
- Scopus
