= List of Saussurea species =

This is a list of species in the plant genus Saussurea, many of which are known as saw-worts. There are over 500 species recognised in the genus Saussurea:

== A ==
- Saussurea abnormis Lipsch.
- Saussurea acromelaena Hand.-Mazz.
- Saussurea acrophila Diels
- Saussurea acroura H.A.Cummins
- Saussurea acuminata Turcz. ex Fisch. & C.A.Mey.
- Saussurea acutisquama Raab-Straube
- Saussurea aerjingensis K.M.Shen
- Saussurea afghana Lipsch.
- Saussurea ainorum Barkalov
- Saussurea ajanensis Lipsch.
- Saussurea alaschanica Maxim.
- Saussurea alata DC.
- Saussurea alatipes Hemsl.
- Saussurea alberti Regel & C.Winkl.
- Saussurea albifolia M.J.Nam & Im
- Saussurea alpina (L.) DC.
- Saussurea amabilis Kitam.
- Saussurea amara (L.) DC.
- Saussurea americana Eaton
- Saussurea amurensis Turcz. ex DC.
- Saussurea andersonii C.B.Clarke
- Saussurea andoana Kadota
- Saussurea andryaloides (DC.) Sch.Bip.
- Saussurea angustifolia (L.) DC.
- Saussurea apus Maxim.
- Saussurea arctecapitulata Lipsch.
- Saussurea arenaria Maxim.
- Saussurea aster Hemsl.
- Saussurea atkinsonii C.B.Clarke
- Saussurea atrata W.E.Evans
- Saussurea austrotibetica Y.S.Chen

== B ==
- Saussurea baicalensis (Adams) B.L.Rob.
- Saussurea balangshanensis Y.Z.Zhang & H.Sun
- Saussurea baoxingensis Y.S.Chen
- Saussurea baroniana Diels
- Saussurea bartholomewii S.W.Liu & T.N.Ho
- Saussurea bella Y.Ling
- Saussurea bhutanensis Y.S.Chen
- Saussurea bhutkesh Fujikawa & H.Ohba
- Saussurea bijiangensis Y.L.Chen ex B.Q.Xu, N.H.Xia & G.Hao
- Saussurea blanda Schrenk
- Saussurea bogedaensis Yu J.Wang & J.Chen
- Saussurea brachycephala Franch.
- Saussurea brachylepis Hand.-Mazz.
- Saussurea bracteata Decne.
- Saussurea brunneopilosa Hand.-Mazz.
- Saussurea bullata W.W.Sm.
- Saussurea bullockii Dunn

== C ==
- Saussurea caespitans Iljin
- Saussurea caespitosa (DC.) Wall. ex Sch.Bip.
- Saussurea calcicola Nakai
- Saussurea cana Ledeb.
- Saussurea candolleana (DC.) Sch.Bip.
- Saussurea canescens C.Winkl.
- Saussurea caprifolia Iljin & Zaprjag.
- Saussurea carduiformis Franch.
- Saussurea catharinae Lipsch.
- Saussurea caudata Franch.
- Saussurea cauloptera Hand.-Mazz.
- Saussurea centiloba Hand.-Mazz.
- Saussurea ceterach Hand.-Mazz.
- Saussurea ceterachifolia Lipsch.
- Saussurea chabyoungsanica Im
- Saussurea chamarensis Peschkova
- Saussurea chetchozensis Franch.
- Saussurea chinduensis Y.S.Chen
- Saussurea chinensis (Maxim.) Lipsch.
- Saussurea chingiana Hand.-Mazz.
- Saussurea chinnampoensis H.Lév. & Vaniot
- Saussurea chionophylla Takeda
- Saussurea chondrilloides C.Winkl.
- Saussurea chrysotricha Ludlow
- Saussurea ciliaris Franch.
- Saussurea cinerea Franch.
- Saussurea clarkei Hook.f.
- Saussurea cochlearifolia Y.L.Chen & S.Yun Liang
- Saussurea colpodes Y.L.Chen & S.Yun Liang
- Saussurea columnaris Hand.-Mazz.
- Saussurea compta Franch.
- Saussurea conaensis (S.W.Liu) Fujikawa & H.Ohba
- Saussurea congesta Turcz. ex DC.
- Saussurea controversa DC.
- Saussurea conyzoides Hemsl.
- Saussurea cordifolia Hemsl.
- Saussurea coriacea Y.L.Chen & S.Yun Liang
- Saussurea coriolepis Hand.-Mazz.
- Saussurea coronata Schrenk.
- Saussurea crupinastrum (Bornm.) Lipsch.
- Saussurea czichaczevii Maneev & Krasnob.

== D ==
- Saussurea daurica Adams
- Saussurea delavayi Franch.
- Saussurea denticulata Ledeb.
- Saussurea depressa Gren.
- Saussurea depsangensis Pamp.
- Saussurea deserticola H.C.Fu
- Saussurea devendrae Pusalkar
- Saussurea dhwojii Kitam.
- Saussurea diamantiaca Nakai
- Saussurea dielsiana Koidz.
- Saussurea diffusa S.Ju.Lipschitz
- Saussurea dimorphaea Franch.
- Saussurea discolor (Willd.) DC.
- Saussurea dolichopoda Diels
- Saussurea donkiah C.B.Clarke ex Spring.
- Saussurea dschungdienensis Hand.-Mazz.
- Saussurea dubia Freyn
- Saussurea dulongjiangensis Y.S.Chen
- Saussurea dzeurensis Franch.

== E ==
- Saussurea elata Ledeb.
- Saussurea elegans Ledeb.
- Saussurea elliptica C.B.Clarke ex Hook.f.
- Saussurea elongata DC.
- Saussurea epilobioides Maxim.
- Saussurea eriocephala Franch.
- Saussurea eriophylla Nakai
- Saussurea eriostemon Wall. ex C.B.Clarke
- Saussurea erubescens Lipsch.
- Saussurea esthonica Baer ex Rupr.
- Saussurea euodonta Diels

== F ==
- Saussurea falconeri Hook.f.
- Saussurea famintziniana Krasn.
- Saussurea fargesii Franch.
- Saussurea fauriei Franch.
- Saussurea fibrosa King ex W.W.Sm.
- Saussurea filicifolia (Hook.f.) Y.S.Chen
- Saussurea firma (Kitag.) Kitam.
- Saussurea fistulosa J.Anthony
- Saussurea flaccida Y.Ling
- Saussurea flexuosa Franch.
- Saussurea foliosa Ledeb.
- Saussurea franchetii Koidz.
- Saussurea frondosa Hand.-Mazz.
- Saussurea fuboensis Kadota
- Saussurea fulcrata Khokhr. & Vorosch.
- Saussurea fuscipappa Y.S.Chen

== G ==
- Saussurea georgei J.Anthony
- Saussurea glabrescens (Hand.-Mazz.) Y.S.Chen
- Saussurea glacialis Herder
- Saussurea glandulosa Kitam.
- Saussurea glandulosissima Raab-Straube
- Saussurea globosa F.H.Chen
- Saussurea gnaphalodes (Royle ex DC.) Sch.Bip.
- Saussurea gongriensis Y.S.Chen
- Saussurea gossipiphora D.Don
- Saussurea graciliformis Lipsch.
- Saussurea gracilis Maxim.
- Saussurea graminea Dunn
- Saussurea graminifolia Wall. ex DC.
- Saussurea grandiceps S.W.Liu
- Saussurea grandifolia Maxim.
- Saussurea griffithii Boiss.
- Saussurea grosseserrata Franch.
- Saussurea grubovii Lipsch.
- Saussurea gubanovii Kamelin
- Saussurea gyacaensis S.W.Liu
- Saussurea gymnocephala (Y.Ling) Raab-Straube

== H ==
- Saussurea habashanensis Y.S.Chen
- Saussurea haizishanensis B.Q.Xu, G.Hao & N.H.Xia
- Saussurea hamanakaensis Kadota
- Saussurea hemsleyi Lipsch.
- Saussurea hengduanshanensis Raab-Straube
- Saussurea henryi Hemsl.
- Saussurea hieracioides Hook.f.
- Saussurea hookeri C.B.Clarke
- Saussurea hosoiana Kadota
- Saussurea huashanensis (Y.Ling) X.Y.Wu
- Saussurea hultenii Lipsch.
- Saussurea hwangshanensis Y.Ling
- Saussurea hybrida Degen & Gáyer
- Saussurea hylophila Hand.-Mazz.
- Saussurea hypargyrea Lipsch. & Vved.

== I ==
- Saussurea igoschinae Knjaz., A.G.Bystr. & E.V.Bystr.
- Saussurea inaensis Kitam.
- Saussurea insularis Kitam.
- Saussurea integrifolia Hand.-Mazz.
- Saussurea inversa Raab-Straube
- Saussurea involucrata (Kar. & Kir.) Sch.Bip.
- Saussurea iodoleuca Hand.-Mazz.
- Saussurea iodostegia Hance
- Saussurea ispajensis Iljin
- Saussurea italica Pînzaru

== J ==
- Saussurea jadrincevii Krylov
- Saussurea japonica (Thunb.) DC.
- Saussurea jindongensis Y.S.Chen
- Saussurea jiulongensis Y.S.Chen
- Saussurea jurineioides H.C.Fu

== K ==
- Saussurea kabadiana Rassulova & B.A.Sharipova
- Saussurea kamtschatica Barkalov
- Saussurea kanaii Fujikawa & H.Ohba
- Saussurea kansuensis Hand.-Mazz.
- Saussurea kanzanensis Kitam.
- Saussurea karaartscha Saposhn.
- Saussurea × karuizawensis H.Hara
- Saussurea kaschgarica Rupr.
- Saussurea katoana Kadota
- Saussurea katochaete Maxim.
- Saussurea kawakarpo Raab-Straube
- Saussurea kenji-horieana Kadota
- Saussurea khunjerabensis Y.S.Chen
- Saussurea kingii J.R.Drumm. ex C.E.C.Fisch.
- Saussurea kiraisiensis Masam.
- Saussurea kitamurana Miyabe & Tatew.
- Saussurea klementzii Lipsch.
- Saussurea kolesnikovii Khokhryakov & Vorosch.
- Saussurea komarnitzkii Lipsch.
- Saussurea komaroviana Lipsch.
- Saussurea krasnoborovii S.V.Smirn.
- Saussurea krylovii Schischk. & Serg.
- Saussurea kubotae Kadota
- Saussurea kungii Y.Ling
- Saussurea kurentzoviae Barkalov
- Saussurea kurilensis Tatew.

== L ==
- Saussurea laciniata Ledeb.
- Saussurea lacostei Danguy
- Saussurea ladyginii Lipsch.
- Saussurea laminamaensis Kitam.
- Saussurea lampsanifolia Franch.
- Saussurea laneana W.W.Sm.
- Saussurea langpoensis Y.S.Chen
- Saussurea laniceps Hand.-Mazz.
- Saussurea larionowii C.Winkl.
- Saussurea latifolia Ledeb.
- Saussurea lavrenkoana Lipsch.
- Saussurea leclerei H.Lév.
- Saussurea lehmannii (Bunge) N.Garcia, Herrando & Susanna
- Saussurea leiocarpa Hand.-Mazz.
- Saussurea lenensis Popov
- Saussurea leontodontoides (DC.) Sch.Bip.
- Saussurea leptolepis Hand.-Mazz.
- Saussurea leucoma Diels
- Saussurea leucophylla Schrenk
- Saussurea lhozhagensis Y.S.Chen
- Saussurea lhunzensis Y.S.Chen
- Saussurea lhunzhubensis Y.L.Chen & S.Yun Liang
- Saussurea liangshanensis Y.S.Chen
- Saussurea licentiana Hand.-Mazz.
- Saussurea limprichtii Diels
- Saussurea linearifolia Ludlow
- Saussurea lingulata Franch.
- Saussurea lipschitzii Filatova
- Saussurea lomatolepis Lipsch.
- Saussurea longifolia Franch.
- Saussurea loriformis W.W.Sm.
- Saussurea luae Raab-Straube
- Saussurea lyrata (Bunge) Franch.

== M ==
- Saussurea macrota Franch.
- Saussurea mae H.C.Fu
- Saussurea malitiosa Maxim.
- Saussurea manshurica Kom.
- Saussurea maximowiczii Herder
- Saussurea medusa Maxim.
- Saussurea megacephala C.C.Chang ex Y.S.Chen
- Saussurea megaphylla (X.Y.Wu) Y.S.Chen
- Saussurea melanotricha Hand.-Mazz.
- Saussurea merinoi H.Lév.
- Saussurea micradenia Hand.-Mazz.
- Saussurea mihokokawakamiana Kadota
- Saussurea mikeschinii Iljin
- Saussurea minuta C.Winkl.
- Saussurea minutiloba Y.S.Chen
- Saussurea × mirabilis Kitam.
- Saussurea modesta Kitam.
- Saussurea mongolica (Franch.) Franch.
- Saussurea montana J.Anthony
- Saussurea morifolia F.H.Chen
- Saussurea morozeviczi B.Fedtsch.
- Saussurea mucronulata Lipsch.
- Saussurea muliensis Hand.-Mazz.
- Saussurea multiloba Y.S.Chen
- Saussurea mutabilis Diels

== N ==
- Saussurea nagensis C.E.C.Fisch.
- Saussurea nakagawae Kadota
- Saussurea nakaiana Kom.
- Saussurea namhaedoana J.M.Chung & Im
- Saussurea neichiana Kadota
- Saussurea nematolepis Y.Ling
- Saussurea neofranchetii Lipsch.
- Saussurea neopulchella Lipsch.
- Saussurea neoserrata Nakai
- Saussurea nigrescens Maxim.
- Saussurea nikoensis Franch. & Sav.
- Saussurea nimborum W.W.Sm.
- Saussurea ninae Iljin
- Saussurea nipponica Miq.
- Saussurea nishiokae Kitam.
- Saussurea nivea Turcz.
- Saussurea nuda Ledeb.
- Saussurea nupuripoensis Miyabe & T.Miyake
- Saussurea nyalamensis Y.L.Chen & S.Yun Liang
- Saussurea nyingchiensis Y.S.Chen

== O ==
- Saussurea oblongifolia F.H.Chen
- Saussurea obscura Lipsch.
- Saussurea obvallata (DC.) Sch.Bip.
- Saussurea odontolepis (Herder) Sch.Bip. ex Maxim.
- Saussurea odorata E.Pjak
- Saussurea oligantha Franch.
- Saussurea oligocephala (Y.Ling) Y.Ling
- Saussurea orgaadayi Khanm. & Krasnob.
- Saussurea orientalis (Diels) Raab-Straube
- Saussurea ovata Benth.
- Saussurea ovatifolia Y.L.Chen & S.Yun Liang

== P ==
- Saussurea pachyneura Franch.
- Saussurea pagriensis Y.S.Chen
- Saussurea paleacea Y.L.Chen & S.Yun Liang
- Saussurea paleata Maxim.
- Saussurea pantlingiana W.W.Sm.
- Saussurea parviflora (Poir.) DC.
- Saussurea paucijuga Y.Ling
- Saussurea paxiana Diels
- Saussurea pectinata Bunge ex DC.
- Saussurea peduncularis Franch.
- Saussurea pennata Koidz.
- Saussurea petiolata Kom. ex Lipsch.
- Saussurea petrovii Lipsch.
- Saussurea phaeantha Maxim.
- Saussurea picridifolia (Hand.-Mazz.) Y.S.Chen & Qian Yuan
- Saussurea pilinophylla Diels
- Saussurea pinetorum Hand.-Mazz.
- Saussurea pinnatidentata Lipsch.
- Saussurea pinnatiphylla Grierson & Spring.
- Saussurea piptathera Edgew.
- Saussurea platyphyllaria Ludlow
- Saussurea platypoda Hand.-Mazz.
- Saussurea poljakowii Glehn
- Saussurea polycephala Hand.-Mazz.
- Saussurea polycolea Hand.-Mazz.
- Saussurea polygonifolia F.H.Chen
- Saussurea polypodioides J.Anthony
- Saussurea polystichoides Hook.f.
- Saussurea poochlamys Hand.-Mazz.
- Saussurea popovii Lipsch.
- Saussurea populifolia Hemsl.
- Saussurea porcii Degen
- Saussurea porphyroleuca Hand.-Mazz.
- Saussurea pratensis J.Anthony
- Saussurea pricei N.D.Simpson
- Saussurea prostrata C.Winkl.
- Saussurea przewalskii Maxim.
- Saussurea pseudoalpina N.D.Simpson
- Saussurea pseudoangustifolia Lipsch.
- Saussurea pseudoblanda Lipsch. ex Filat
- Saussurea pseudobullockii Lipsch.
- Saussurea pseudochondrilloides Rassulova & B.A.Sharipova
- Saussurea pseudoeriostemon Y.S.Chen
- Saussurea pseudogracilis Kitam.
- Saussurea pseudograminea Y.F.Wang, G.Z.Du & Y.S.Lian
- Saussurea pseudojiulongensis Y.S.Chen
- Saussurea pseudoleucoma Y.S.Chen
- Saussurea pseudolingulata Y.S.Chen
- Saussurea pseudomalitiosa Lipsch.
- Saussurea pseudoplatyphyllaria Y.S.Chen
- Saussurea pseudorockii Y.S.Chen
- Saussurea pseudosalsa Lipsch.
- Saussurea pseudosimpsoniana Y.S.Chen
- Saussurea pseudosquarrosa Popov & Lipsch.
- Saussurea pseudotilesii Lipsch.
- Saussurea pseudotridactyla Y.S.Chen
- Saussurea pseudoyunnanensis Y.S.Chen
- Saussurea pteridophylla Hand.-Mazz.
- Saussurea pubescens Y.L.Chen & S.Yun Liang
- Saussurea pubifolia S.W.Liu
- Saussurea pulchella (Fisch.) Fisch. ex Colla
- Saussurea pulchra Lipsch.
- Saussurea pulvinata Maxim.
- Saussurea pulviniformis C.Winkl.
- Saussurea pumila C.Winkl.
- Saussurea purpurascens Y.L.Chen & S.Yun Liang
- Saussurea pygmaea Spreng.

== Q ==
- Saussurea qamdoensis Y.S.Chen
- Saussurea qinghaiensis S.W.Liu & T.N.Ho
- Saussurea quercifolia W.W.Sm.

== R ==
- Saussurea ramchaudharyi Ghimire & H.K.Rana
- Saussurea ramosa Lipsch.
- Saussurea rara Kitam.
- Saussurea recurvata (Maxim.) Lipsch.
- Saussurea retroserrata Y.L.Chen & S.Yun Liang
- Saussurea revjakinae S.V.Smirn.
- Saussurea riederi Herder
- Saussurea rigida Ledeb.
- Saussurea robusta Ledeb.
- Saussurea rockii J.Anthony
- Saussurea rolwalingensis Fujikawa & H.Ohba
- Saussurea romuleifolia Franch.
- Saussurea rotundifolia F.H.Chen
- Saussurea roylei (DC.) Sch.Bip.
- Saussurea runcinata DC.

== S ==
- Saussurea sagitta Franch.
- Saussurea sagittifolia Y.S.Chen & S.R.Yi
- Saussurea saichanensis Kom. ex Lipsch.
- Saussurea sajanensis Gudoschn.
- Saussurea salemanni C.Winkl.
- Saussurea salicifolia (L.) DC.
- Saussurea saligna Franch.
- Saussurea salsa (Pall.) Spreng.
- Saussurea salwinensis J.Anthony
- Saussurea satowii Kitam.
- Saussurea sawae Kadota
- Saussurea saxosa Lipsch.
- Saussurea scabrida Franch.
- Saussurea scaposa Franch. & Sav.
- Saussurea schachimardanica Kamelin
- Saussurea schanginiana (Wydler) Fisch. ex Herder
- Saussurea schlagintweitii Klatt
- Saussurea schultzii Hook.f.
- Saussurea schweingruberi Stepanov
- Saussurea semiamplexicaulis Lipsch.
- Saussurea semifasciata Hand.-Mazz.
- Saussurea semilyrata Bureau & Franch.
- Saussurea seoulensis Nakai
- Saussurea septentrionalis Raab-Straube
- Saussurea sericea Y.L.Chen & S.Yun Liang
- Saussurea serratuloides Turcz.
- Saussurea sessiliflora (Koidz.) Kadota
- Saussurea shangrilaensis Y.S.Chen
- Saussurea shiretokoensis Sugaw.
- Saussurea shonaiensis Kadota
- Saussurea shuiluoensis Y.S.Chen
- Saussurea sichuanica Raab-Straube
- Saussurea sikkimensis Raab-Straube
- Saussurea simpsoniana (Fielding & Gardner) Lipsch.
- Saussurea sinuata Kom.
- Saussurea sinuatoides Nakai
- Saussurea smithiana Hand.-Mazz.
- Saussurea sobarocephala Diels
- Saussurea sobarocephaloides Y.S.Chen
- Saussurea solaris Raab-Straube & Lidén
- Saussurea sordida Kar. & Kir.
- Saussurea souliei Franch.
- Saussurea sovietica Kom.
- Saussurea spatulifolia Franch.
- Saussurea spicata Kitam.
- Saussurea splendida Kom.
- Saussurea squarrosa Turcz.
- Saussurea stafleuana Lipsch.
- Saussurea stella Maxim.
- Saussurea stolbensis Stepanov
- Saussurea stoliczkae C.B.Clarke
- Saussurea stracheyana (Kuntze) Lipsch.
- Saussurea stricta Franch.
- Saussurea stubendorffii Herder
- Saussurea subacaulis (Ledeb.) Serg.
- Saussurea × subgracilis K.Asano ex T.Shimizu
- Saussurea subtriangulata Kom.
- Saussurea subulata C.B.Clarke
- Saussurea subulisquama Hand.-Mazz.
- Saussurea sudhanshui Hajra
- Saussurea sughoo C.B.Clarke
- Saussurea sugimurai Honda
- Saussurea sugongii S.W.Liu & T.N.Ho
- Saussurea sunhangii Raab-Straube
- Saussurea superba J.Anthony
- Saussurea sutchuenensis Franch.
- Saussurea sylvatica Maxim.

== T ==
- Saussurea tadshikorum Iljin & Gontsch.
- Saussurea taipaiensis Y.Ling
- Saussurea tanakae Franch. & Sav. ex Maxim.
- Saussurea tangutica Maxim.
- Saussurea taraxacifolia (Lindl. ex Royle) Wall. ex DC.
- Saussurea tatsienensis Franch.
- Saussurea tenerifolia Kitag.
- Saussurea thomsonii C.B.Clarke
- Saussurea thoroldii Hemsl.
- Saussurea tianshuiensis X.Y.Wu
- Saussurea tibetica C.Winkl.
- Saussurea tilesii (Ledeb.) Ledeb.
- Saussurea tobitae Kitam.
- Saussurea tomentosa Kom.
- Saussurea tomentosella A.P.Khokhr.
- Saussurea topkegolensis H.Ohba & S.Akiyama
- Saussurea triangulata Trautv. & C.A.Mey.
- Saussurea tridactyla Sch.Bip. ex Hook.f.
- Saussurea triptera Maxim.
- Saussurea tsoongii Y.S.Chen
- Saussurea tunglingensis F.H.Chen
- Saussurea turgaiensis B.Fedtsch.

== U ==
- Saussurea ugoensis Kadota
- Saussurea uliginosa Hand.-Mazz.
- Saussurea umbrosa Kom.
- Saussurea undulata Hand.-Mazz.
- Saussurea uniflora (DC.) Wall. ex Sch.Bip.
- Saussurea × uralensis Lipsch.
- Saussurea uryuensis (Kadota) Kadota
- Saussurea ussuriensis Maxim.

== V ==
- Saussurea variiloba Y.Ling
- Saussurea veitchiana J.R.Drumm. & Hutch.
- Saussurea velutina W.W.Sm.
- Saussurea vestita Franch.
- Saussurea vestitiformis Hand.-Mazz.
- Saussurea virgata Franch.
- Saussurea vvedenskyi Lipsch.
- Saussurea vyschinii Barkalov

== W ==
- Saussurea wakasugiana Kadota
- Saussurea wardii J.Anthony
- Saussurea weberi Hultén
- Saussurea wellbyi Hemsl.
- Saussurea wenchengiae B.Q.Xu, G.Hao & N.H.Xia
- Saussurea wernerioides Sch.Bip. ex Hook.f.
- Saussurea wettsteiniana Hand.-Mazz.
- Saussurea winkleri (Iljin) N.Garcia, Herrando & Susanna
- Saussurea woodiana Hemsl.

== X ==
- Saussurea xianrendongensis Y.S.Chen
- Saussurea xiaojinensis Y.S.Chen
- Saussurea xinjiangensis Y.S.Chen

== Y ==
- Saussurea yabulaiensis Y.Y.Yao
- Saussurea yamagataensis Kadota
- Saussurea yanagisawae Takeda
- Saussurea yanagitae Kadota
- Saussurea yangii Y.S.Chen
- Saussurea yanyuanensis Y.S.Chen
- Saussurea yilingii Y.S.Chen
- Saussurea yiwuensis L.Q.Zhao & Xu Ri
- Saussurea yubarimontana Kadota
- Saussurea yui Y.S.Chen
- Saussurea yukiuenoana Kadota
- Saussurea yunnanensis Franch.

== Z ==
- Saussurea zayuensis Y.S.Chen
- Saussurea zhuxiensis Y.S.Chen & Q.L.Gan
- Saussurea zogangensis Y.S.Chen
