= Arctic–alpine =

Examples of Arctic–alpine plants

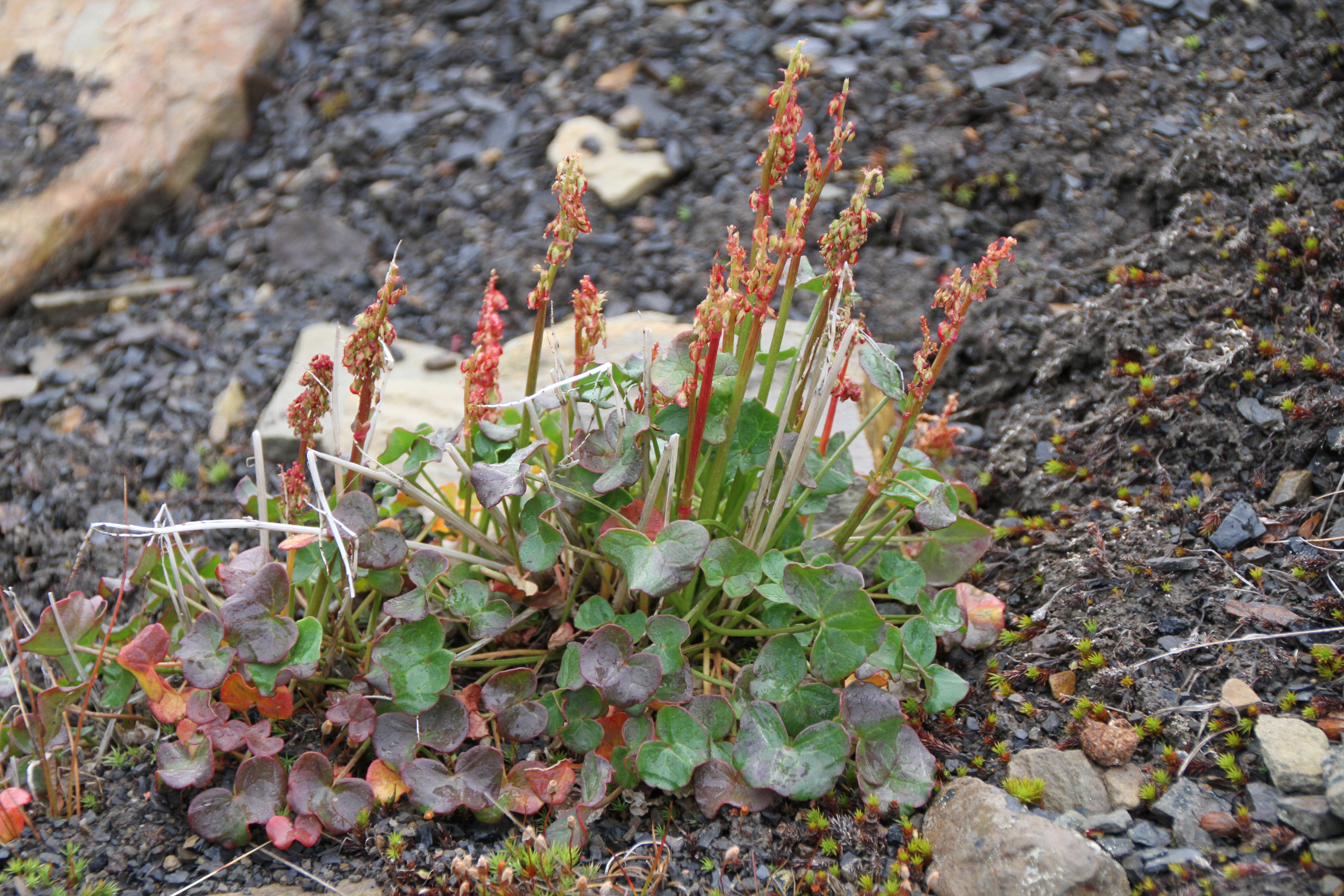
Oxyria digyna growing in the Svalbard archipelago (Arctic; 78° N; near sea level)

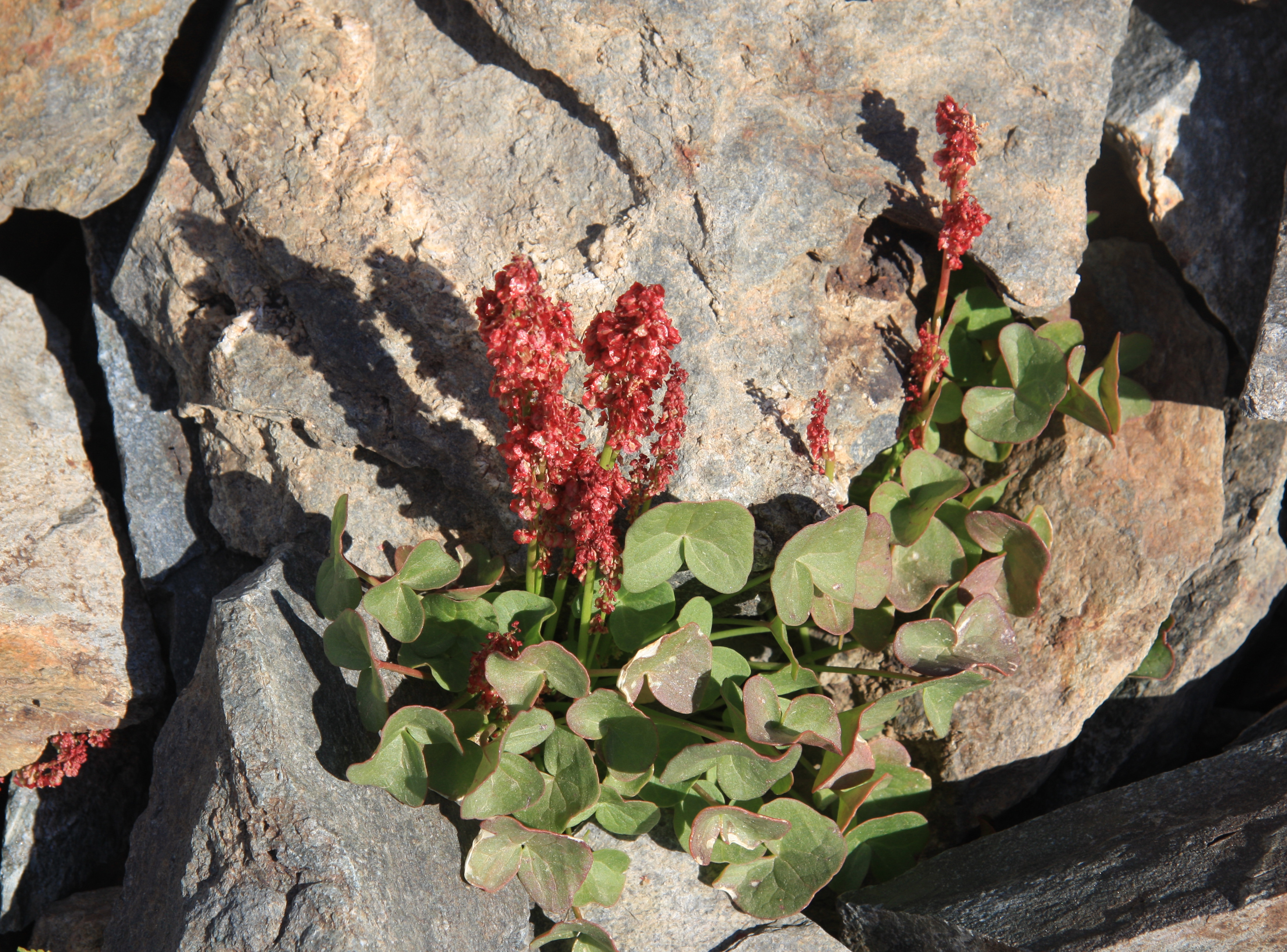
Oxyria digyna growing in the Californian Sierra Nevada (alpine; 38° N; 3300 m above sea level)

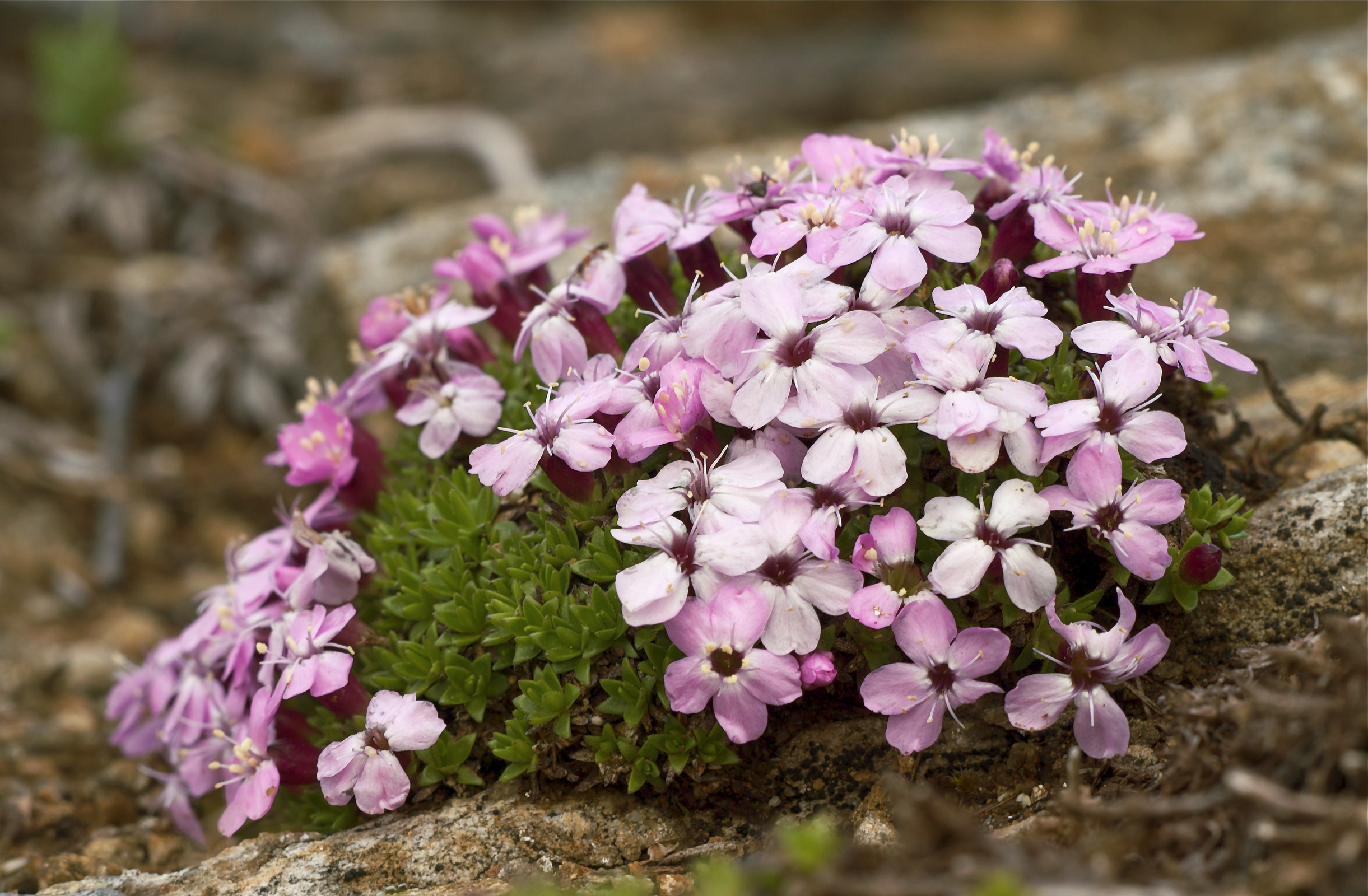
Silene acaulis growing in northern Norway (Arctic; 67° N; 100 m above sea level)

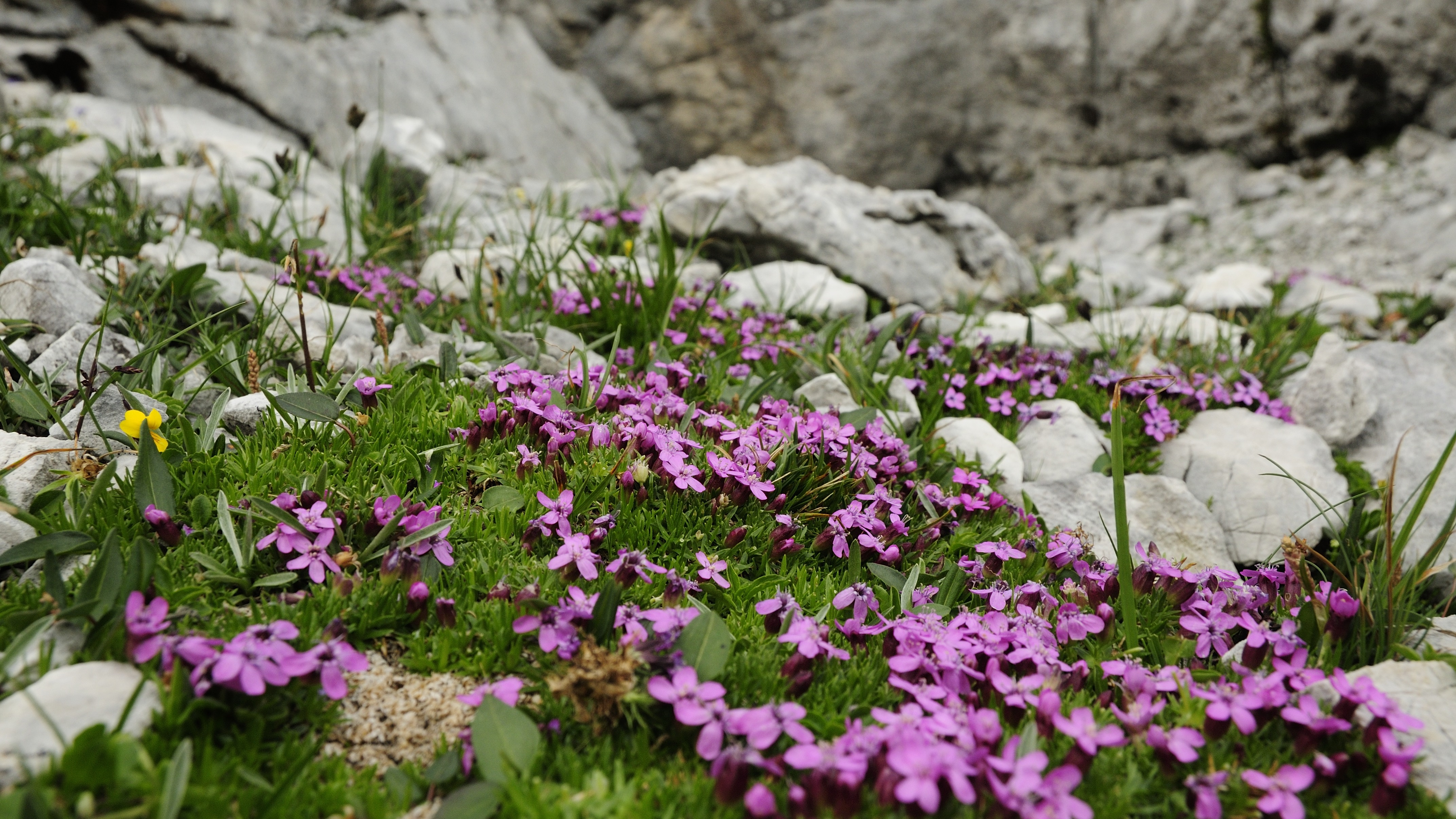
Silene acaulis growing in the Austrian Alps (Alpine; 47° N; 2200 m above sea level)

An Arctic–alpine taxon is one whose natural distribution includes the Arctic and more southerly mountain ranges, particularly the Alps. The presence of identical or similar taxa in both the tundra of the far north, and high mountain ranges much further south is testament to the similar environmental conditions found in the two locations. Arctic–alpine plants, for instance, must be adapted to the low temperatures, extremes of temperature, strong winds and short growing season; they are therefore typically low-growing and often form mats or cushions to reduce water loss through evapotranspiration.

It is often assumed that an organism which currently has an Arctic–alpine distribution was, during colder periods of the Earth's history (such as during the Pleistocene glaciations), widespread across the area between the Arctic and the Alps. This is known from pollen records to be true for Dryas octopetala, for instance. In other cases, the disjunct distribution may be the result of long-distance dispersal.

Examples of Arctic–alpine plants include:

- Arabis alpina
- Betula nana
- Draba incana
- Dryas octopetala
- Gagea serotina (syn. Lloydia serotina)
- Loiseleuria procumbens
- Micranthes stellaris
- Oxyria digyna
- Ranunculus glacialis
- Salix herbacea
- Saussurea alpina
- Saxifraga oppositifolia
- Silene acaulis
- Thalictrum alpinum
- Veronica alpina
