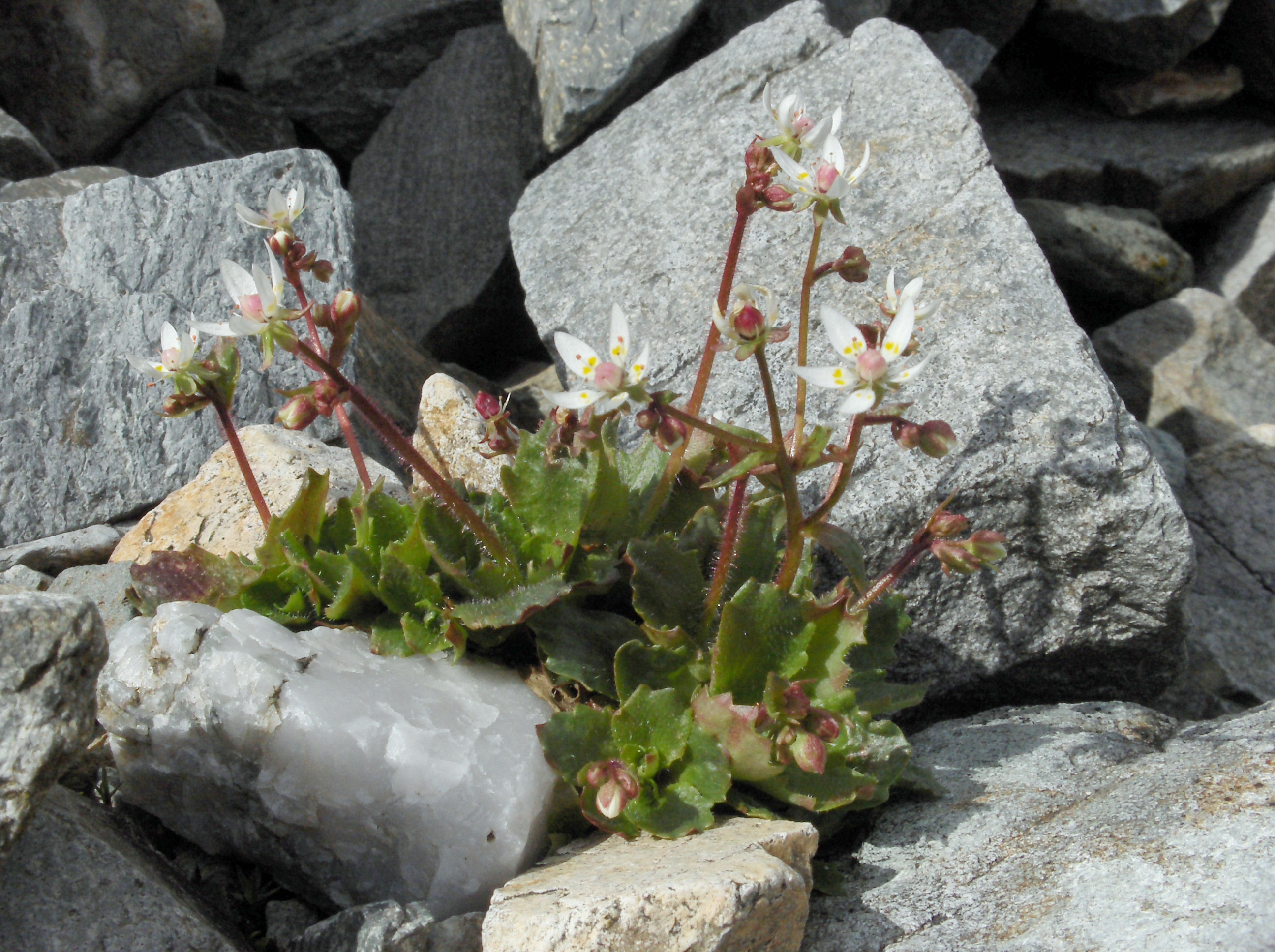
- M. stellaris subsp. stellaris

Scientific classification
- Kingdom: Plantae
- Clade: Tracheophytes
- Clade: Angiosperms
- Clade: Eudicots
- Order: Saxifragales
- Family: Saxifragaceae
- Genus: Micranthes
- Species: M. stellaris

Binomial name
- Micranthes stellaris (L.) Galasso, Banfi & Soldano

Subspecies
- M. stellaris subsp. hispidula (Rochel) Gornall; M. stellaris subsp. prolifera (Sternb.) Schönb.-Tem., syn. M. stellaris var. prolifera (Sternb.) Gornall; M. stellaris subsp. robusta (Engl.) Gremli; M. stellaris subsp. stellaris

Synonyms
- Hydatica stellaris (L.) Gray; Robertsonia stellaris (L.) Link; Saxifraga stellaris L.; Spatularia stellaris (L.) Haw.

= Micranthes stellaris =

Species of plant

Micranthes stellaris, synonym Saxifraga stellaris, the starry saxifrage or hairy kidney-wort, is an Arctic–alpine species in the family Saxifragaceae. It produces panicles of 5–10 white flowers on a stem up to 20 cm (7.9 in) tall, rising from a basal leaf rosette. One subspecies is found from eastern Canada to Russia, including the British Isles, while another is found in the mountains of southern Europe.

== Description ==
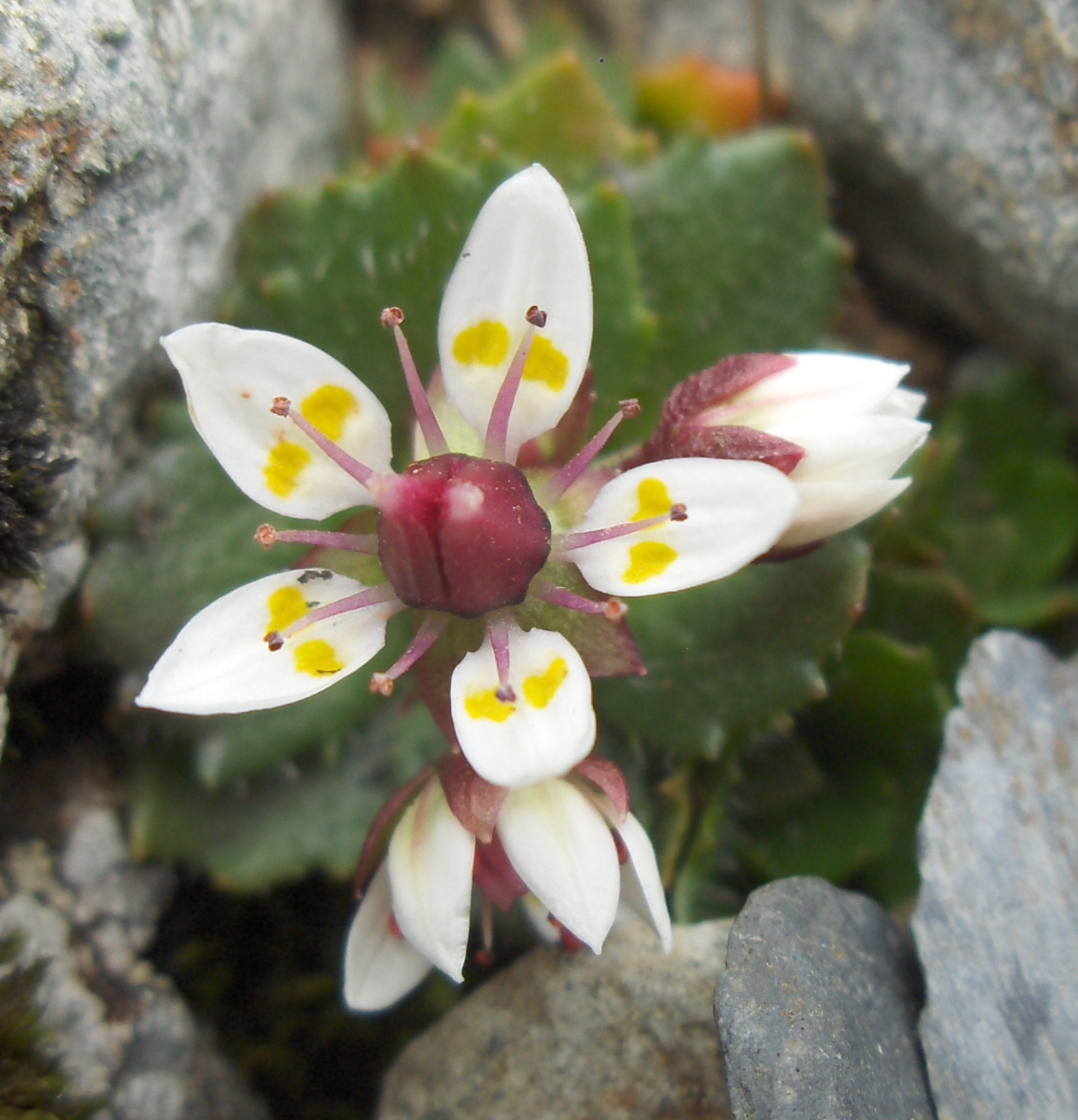
Close-up of a flower, showing the two yellow spots at the base of each petal

Micranthes stellaris grows as a leaf rosette, which produces a generally leafless stem up to 20 centimetres (7.9 in) tall. The leaves are toothed and somewhat fleshy, ovate or obovate, and without an obvious petiole. They are typically 3 cm (1.2 in) long (varying from 1 to 5 centimetres or 0.4 to 2.0 inches), with a cuneate (wedge-shaped) base.

The flowers are borne in a loose panicle comprising 5–10 flowers; each flower has deflexed sepals, surrounding five white petals, 3–6 millimetres (0.12–0.24 in) long, with two yellow or red spots near the base. There are 10 stamens. The anthers are also red or yellow. Flowers are borne from June to August.

The seeds are dark brown, glabrous, 0.6–0.8 mm (0.024–0.031 in) long, and 0.3–0.4 mm (0.012–0.016 in) wide. They are elliptic, ovoid or reniform in shape, with longitudinal ribs bearing spines. M. stellaris has a chromosome number of 2n = 28.

== Taxonomy ==
Micranthes stellaris was first described by Carl Linnaeus in his 1753 work Species Plantarum as Saxifraga stellaris. Linnaeus noted the species' occurrence in the mountains of Spitsbergen, Lapland, Switzerland, Styria and Westmorland. The nominate subspecies, Micranthes stellaris subsp. stellaris is the northern subspecies, occurring from Canada to Russia, including the British Isles. The subspecies in the Alpide belt and other mountains in southern Europe is often called M. stellaris subsp. alpigena, but an older name has priority – M. stellaris subsp. robusta. The name M. stellaris subsp. prolifera is used for plants from the south-eastern Alps which have few flowers but produce bulbils along the stems.

== Distribution and ecology ==
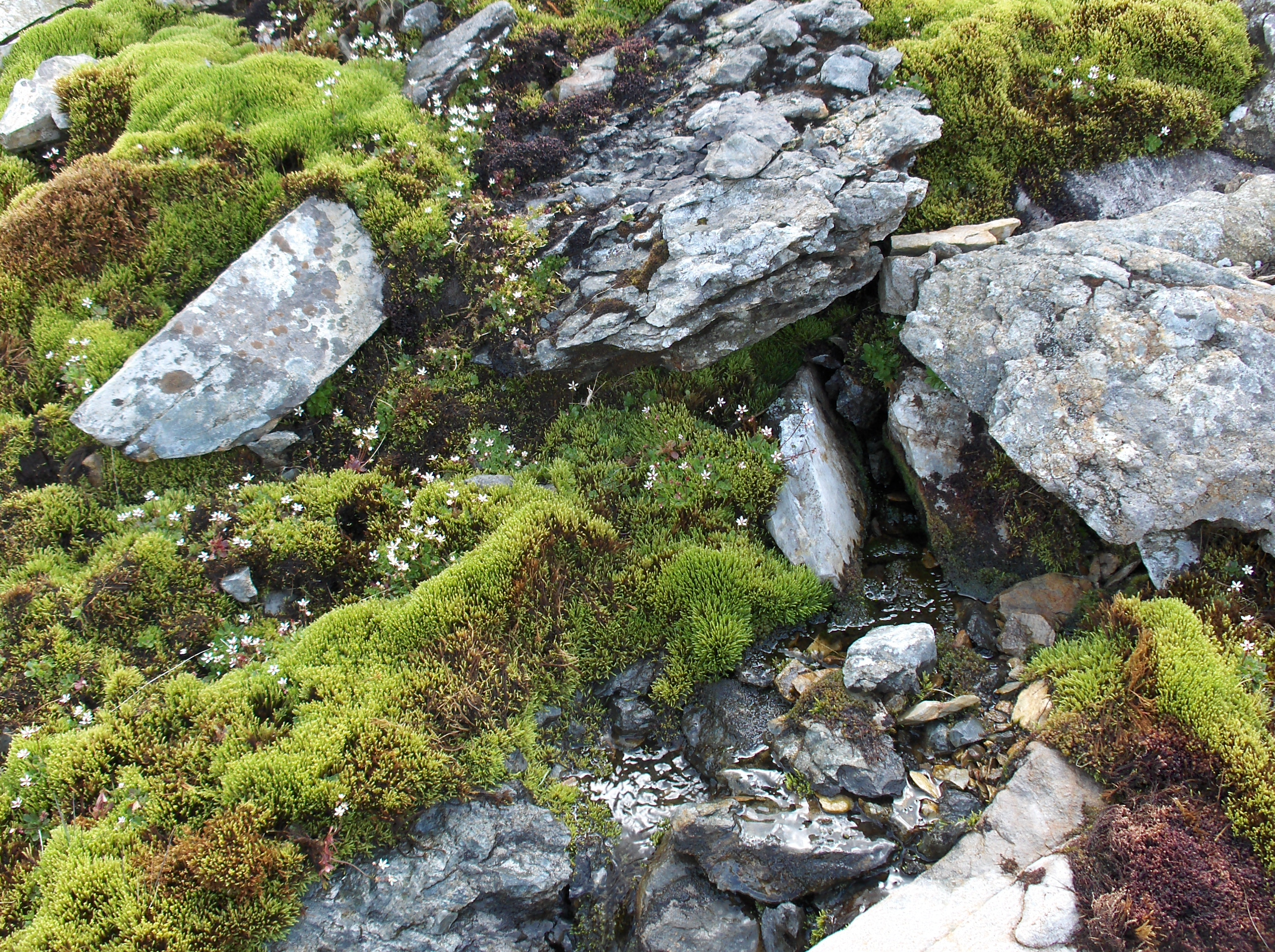
Typical habitat: on wet rocks in a wet mountain flush

Micranthes stellaris has an Arctic–alpine distribution. It is found from Baffin Island, Labrador and Greenland to Arctic Russia, including Iceland, Scandinavia and the British Isles. Further south, it is found from the Sierra Nevada in southern Spain to the eastern Carpathians, including lower ranges such as the Massif Central.

In the Arctic, M. stellaris may occur down to sea level. Within the British Isles, M. stellaris is abundant in North Wales, Northern England and Scotland, reaching the summit of Ben Nevis (1,344 m or 4,409 ft), but is only found locally in Ireland. Its southernmost stations in Great Britain are the slopes of Plynlimon and the Rheidol valley; it does not occur in the mountains of South Wales. In the Vosges, it occurs around 3,600 ft (1,100 m), but only rarely below 4,300–4,600 ft (1,300–1,400 m) in the Swiss Alps. In the Sierra Nevada of southern Spain, it lives at up to 3,350 m (10,990 ft).

Micranthes stellaris lives in damp environments, such as wet flushes, beside streams or springs, or on wet rock ledges. It is self-compatible, but its flowers are protandrous, and are usually pollinated by flies.

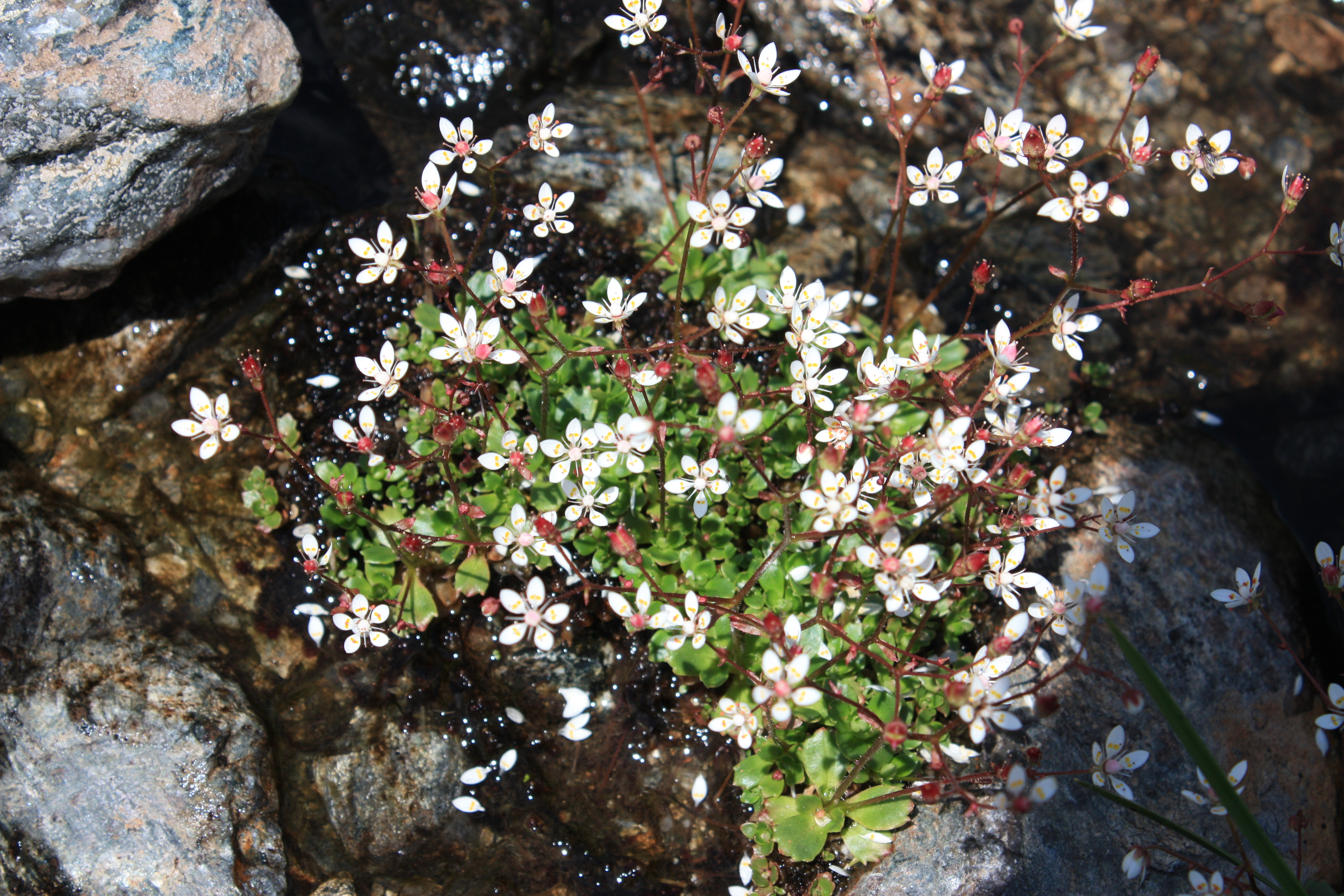
M. stellaris subsp. robusta
