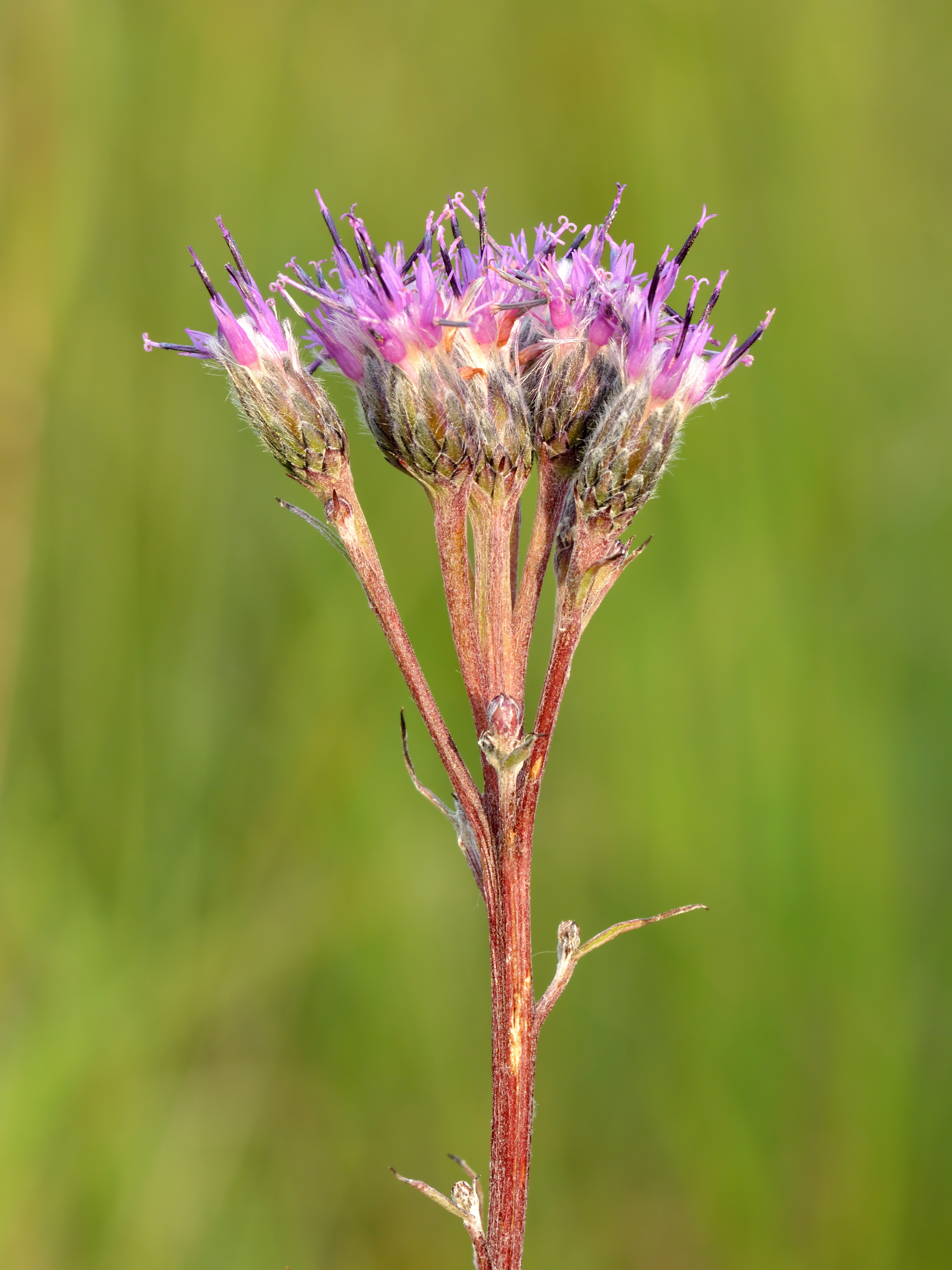

Scientific classification
- Kingdom: Plantae
- Clade: Tracheophytes
- Clade: Angiosperms
- Clade: Eudicots
- Clade: Asterids
- Order: Asterales
- Family: Asteraceae
- Genus: Saussurea
- Species: S. esthonica

Binomial name
- Saussurea esthonica Baer ex Rupr.

= Saussurea esthonica =

Species of flowering plant

Saussurea esthonica is a species of Saussurea native to Estonia and Latvia.

== Synonym ==
Saussurea alpina subsp. esthonica (Rupr.) Kupffer.
