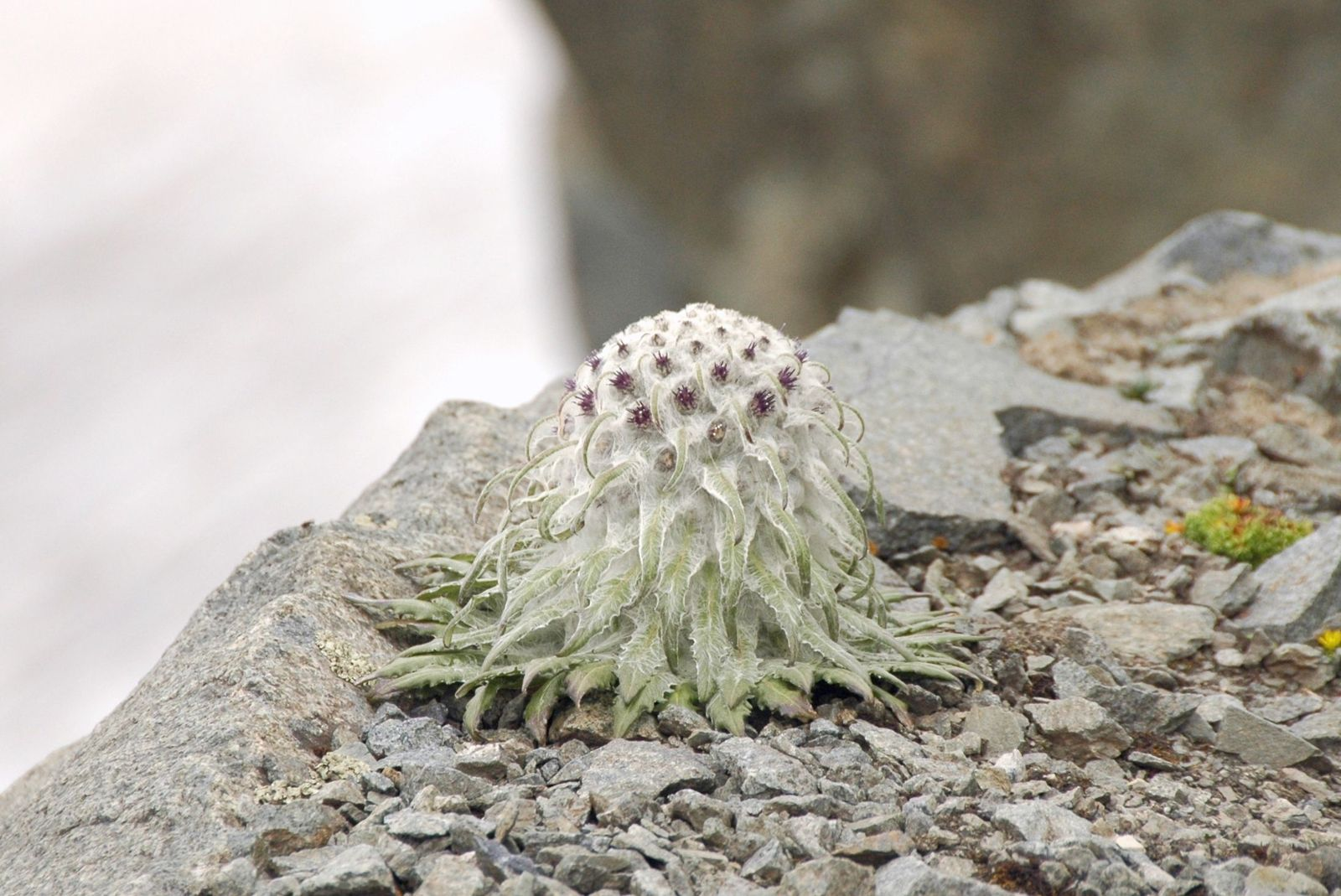

Scientific classification
- Kingdom: Plantae
- Clade: Tracheophytes
- Clade: Angiosperms
- Clade: Eudicots
- Clade: Asterids
- Order: Asterales
- Family: Asteraceae
- Genus: Saussurea
- Species: S. simpsoniana

Binomial name
- Saussurea simpsoniana (Fielding & Gardner) Lipsch.

= Saussurea simpsoniana =

Species of plant

Saussurea simpsoniana is a high-elevation species in the Asteraceae found in the Himalayan mountains. It is found on alpine meadows and rocky slopes and screes near the snowline at elevations of 3300–5600 m. Local common names include Phen Kamal (Hindi), Jogi Padsha (Kashmiri), and Ghuggi (Dogri). It has a long history of medicinal use for a range of ailments, and as such has been over collected in places. Sources generally consider it to be rare or endangered, but it is not listed by the IUCN Red List at this time. It is similar in appearance to another Himalayan alpine endemic, Saussurea gossypiphora, however S. simpsoniana differs in that its purple flowers are visible poking through the thick, wool-like covering of white hairs that envelopes the head of the plant.
