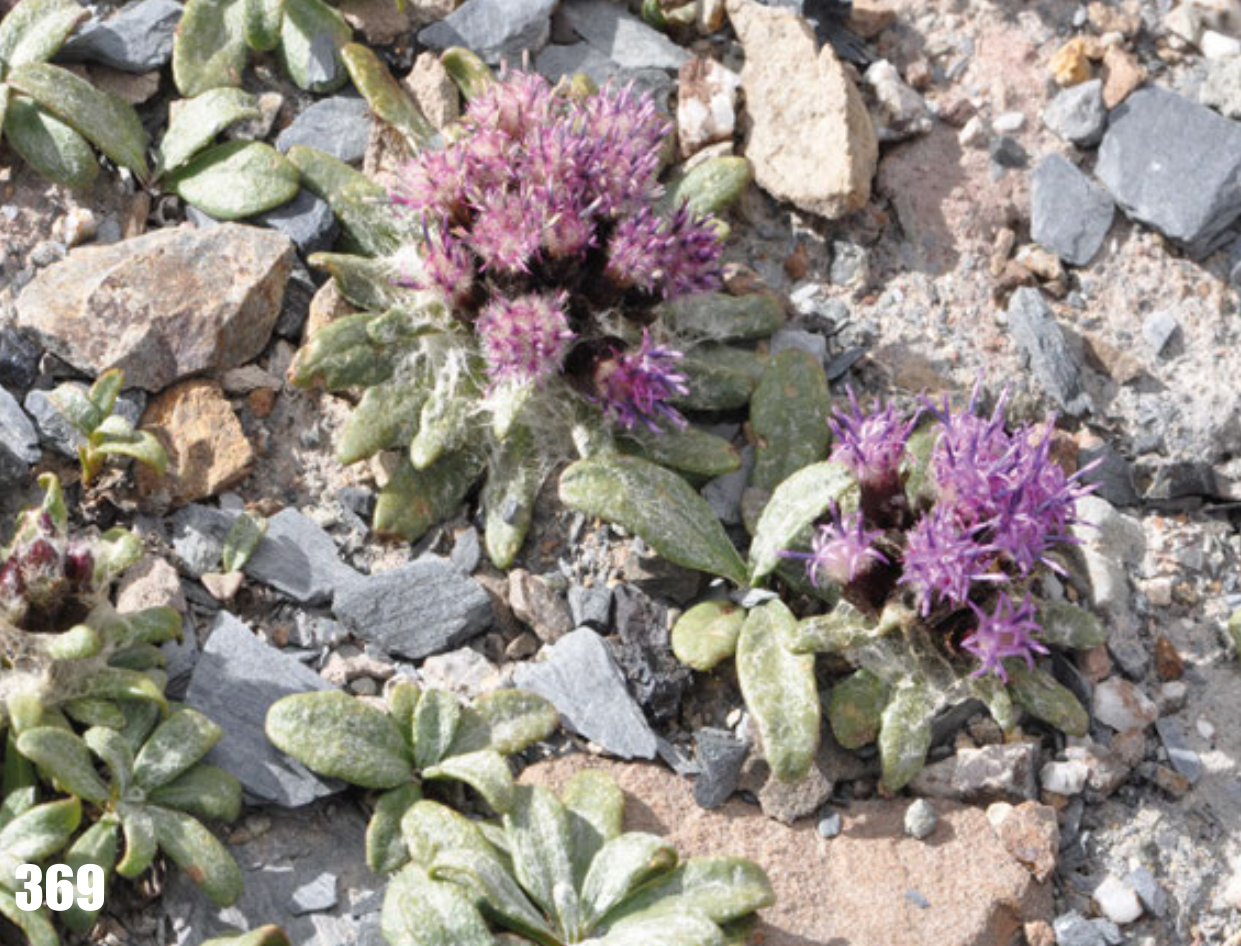
- In Tajikistan

Scientific classification
- Kingdom: Plantae
- Clade: Tracheophytes
- Clade: Angiosperms
- Clade: Eudicots
- Clade: Asterids
- Order: Asterales
- Family: Asteraceae
- Genus: Saussurea
- Species: S. glacialis

Binomial name
- Saussurea glacialis Herder

= Saussurea glacialis =

Species of plant

Saussurea glacialis, or glacial snow lotus, is a species of plant in the genus Saussurea native to E Afghanistan, NW India, Ladakh, E Kazakhstan, Kyrgyzstan, Mongolia, N Pakistan, Siberia, and Tajikistan.

== Description ==
this species is a 2–6 cm tall polycarpic perennial, growing on a short stem, with hemispheric synflorescences 1.5-4 cm in diameter as flowers. the lower leaves are small, succulent and finely hairy. It grows in alpine and subalpine environments.
