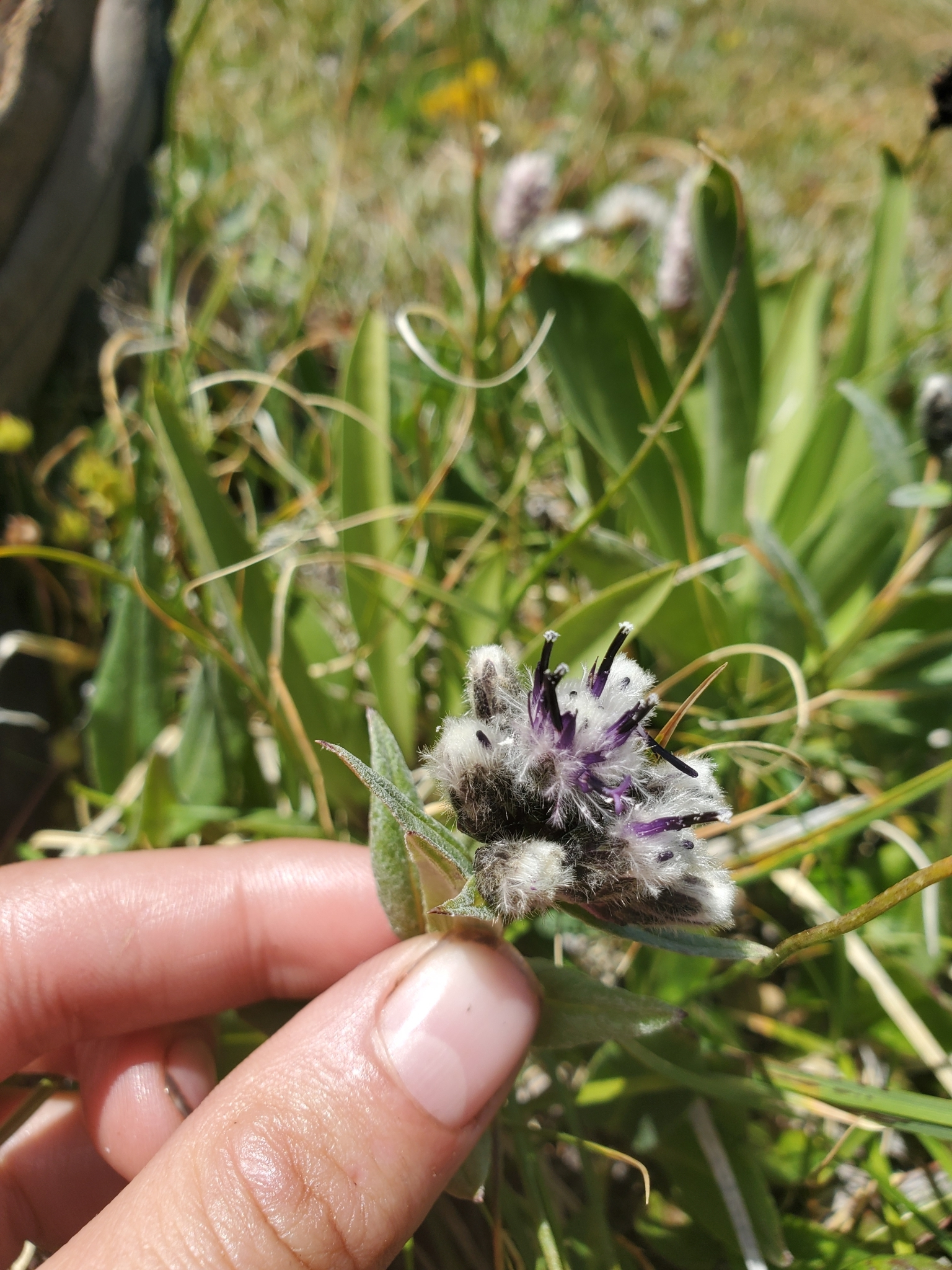

Conservation status
- Vulnerable (NatureServe)

Scientific classification
- Kingdom: Plantae
- Clade: Tracheophytes
- Clade: Angiosperms
- Clade: Eudicots
- Clade: Asterids
- Order: Asterales
- Family: Asteraceae
- Genus: Saussurea
- Species: S. weberi

Binomial name
- Saussurea weberi Hultén

= Saussurea weberi =

Species of flowering plant

Saussurea weberi is a species of flowering plant in the genus Saussurea, the saw-worts. It is endemic to the U.S. states of Montana, Colorado and Wyoming and considered imperiled to vulnerable globally.

== Habitat ==
Saussurea weberi is found in moist alpine meadows.

== Threats ==
This plant's range is limited by its highly specific alpine habitat requirements. The greatest threat to its continued survival is anthropogenic climate change.
