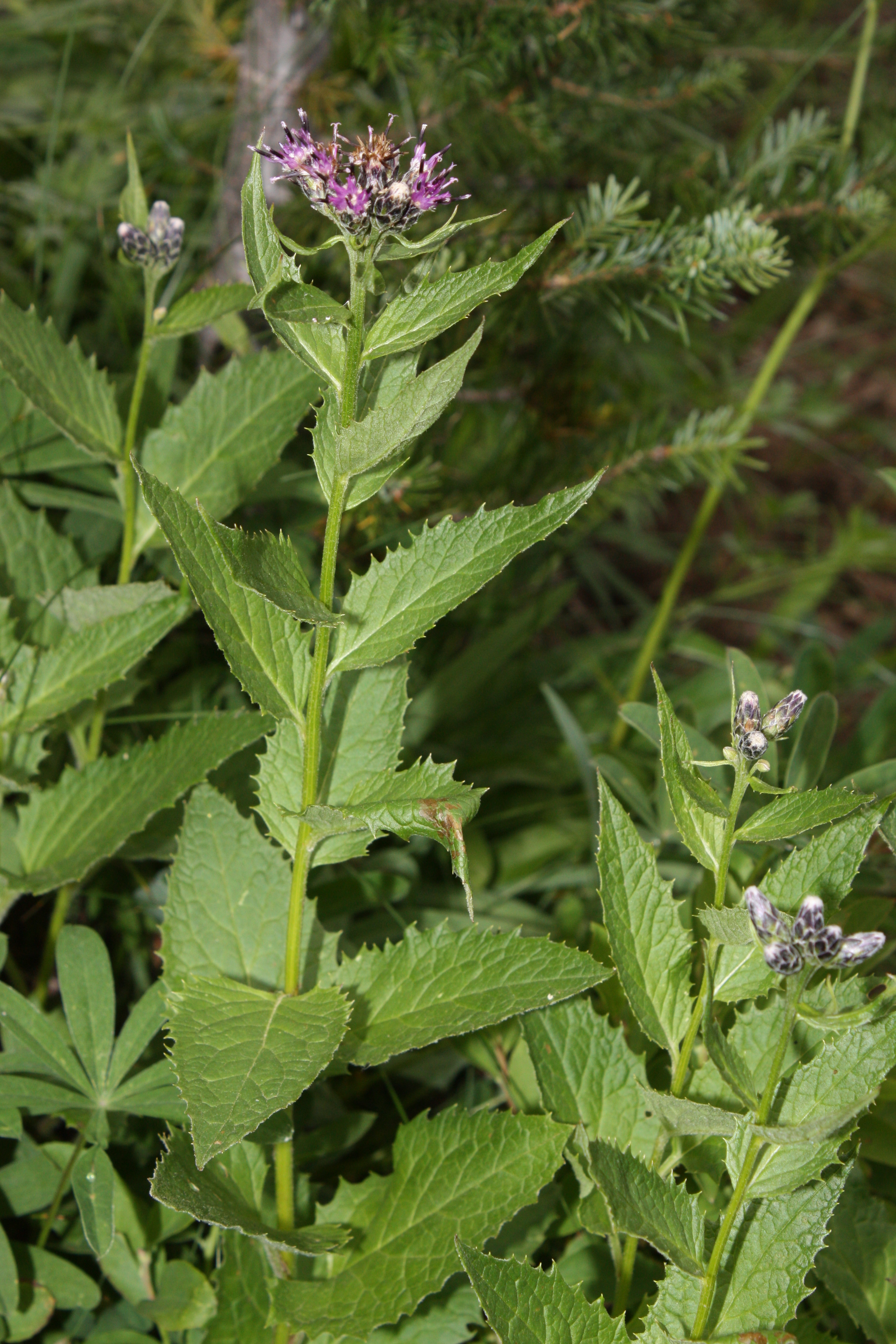

Scientific classification
- Kingdom: Plantae
- Clade: Tracheophytes
- Clade: Angiosperms
- Clade: Eudicots
- Clade: Asterids
- Order: Asterales
- Family: Asteraceae
- Genus: Saussurea
- Species: S. americana

Binomial name
- Saussurea americana D.C.Eaton

= Saussurea americana =

Species of plant

Saussurea americana is a species of flowering plant in the family Asteraceae in the genus Saussurea known by the common name American saw-wort. It is native to northwestern North America from Alaska to far northern California to Montana, where it grows in mountain habitat, such as meadows and forests.

== Appearance ==
It is a perennial herb producing one or more hairy, glandular, erect stems up to a meter tall or more from a thick caudex. The lance-shaped leaves are up to 15 centimeters long and have toothed edges, especially the larger lower leaves. The inflorescence is a cluster of several flower heads, each a bullet-shaped body covered in purple or purple-tinged green phyllaries. The head opens at the tip to bloom with several white to purple tubular disc florets; there are no ray florets. The fruit is an achene tipped with a pappus, the whole unit sometimes exceeding a centimeter in length.
