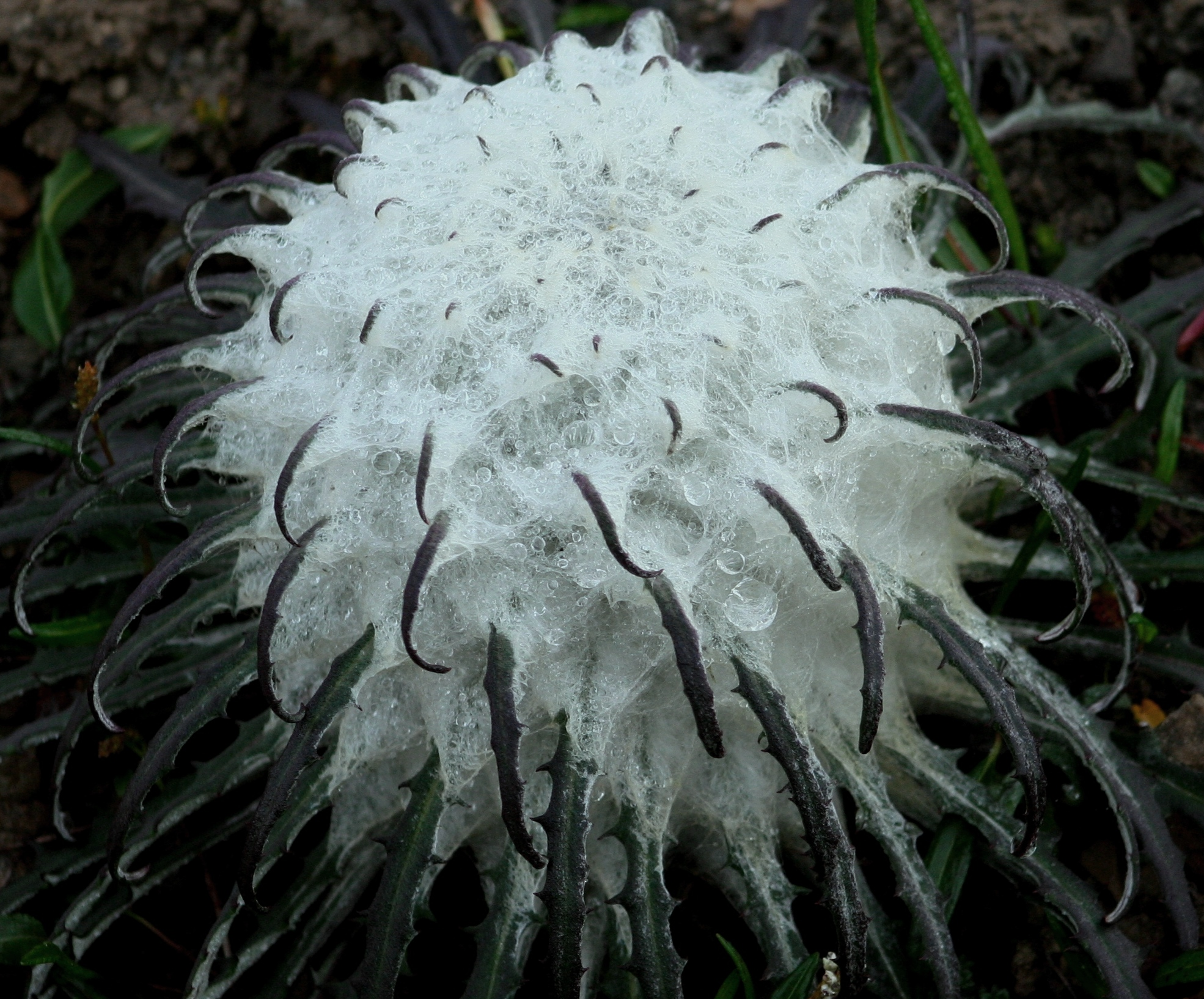

Scientific classification
- Kingdom: Plantae
- Clade: Tracheophytes
- Clade: Angiosperms
- Clade: Eudicots
- Clade: Asterids
- Order: Asterales
- Family: Asteraceae
- Genus: Saussurea
- Species: S. laniceps

Binomial name
- Saussurea laniceps Hand.-Mazz.

= Saussurea laniceps =

Species of plant

Saussurea laniceps (common name cotton-headed snow lotus, simplified Chinese: 绵头雪兔子; traditional Chinese: 綿頭雪兔子; lit. 'cotton head(ed) snow rabbit') is a rare snow lotus found only in the Himalayas including Nepal southwest China (in Sikkim in India and in Sichuan, Tibet and Yunnan in China). It might also occur in northern Burma. It grows above about 3,200 m (10,500 ft) altitude on alpine scree slopes. It is reputed to have medicinal properties according to traditional Chinese medicine. Among the snow lotus, Saussurea laniceps is proven to be more effective for its anti-inflammatory and anti-nociceptive effects.

== Description and life cycle ==
Saussurea laniceps is herbaceous plant that grows 15–45 cm (5.9–17.7 in) tall. It is perennial and monocarpic: individual plants grow slowly (for 7–10 years or more) and die after flowering. Reproductive plants produce a single enlarged inflorescence with 6–36 flower heads. Producing seed requires pollinators. Saussurea laniceps is pollinated by two generalist bumblebee species, Bombus rufofasticatus and Bombus festivus, that appear to specialize on Saussurea laniceps when it is flowering. Its reproductive success does not appear to be limited by pollen availability.

== Exploitation and its consequences ==
The whole plant is used medicinally, and the species is threatened in many regions by over-exploitation.

Preferential collection of the larger plants of the species for medicinal use and souvenirs appears to be causing selection to favour shorter plants in areas that are heavily harvested. Plants in an area that is protected are about 9 cm taller than plants in the harvest areas. Another closely related plant that is not as desirable to collectors, Saussurea medusa, shows no height differences between the protected area and the harvest area. The height differences in the plant may have unknown effects such as reduction of seed production due to shorter stalks but no studies have been done to ascertain the effects.
