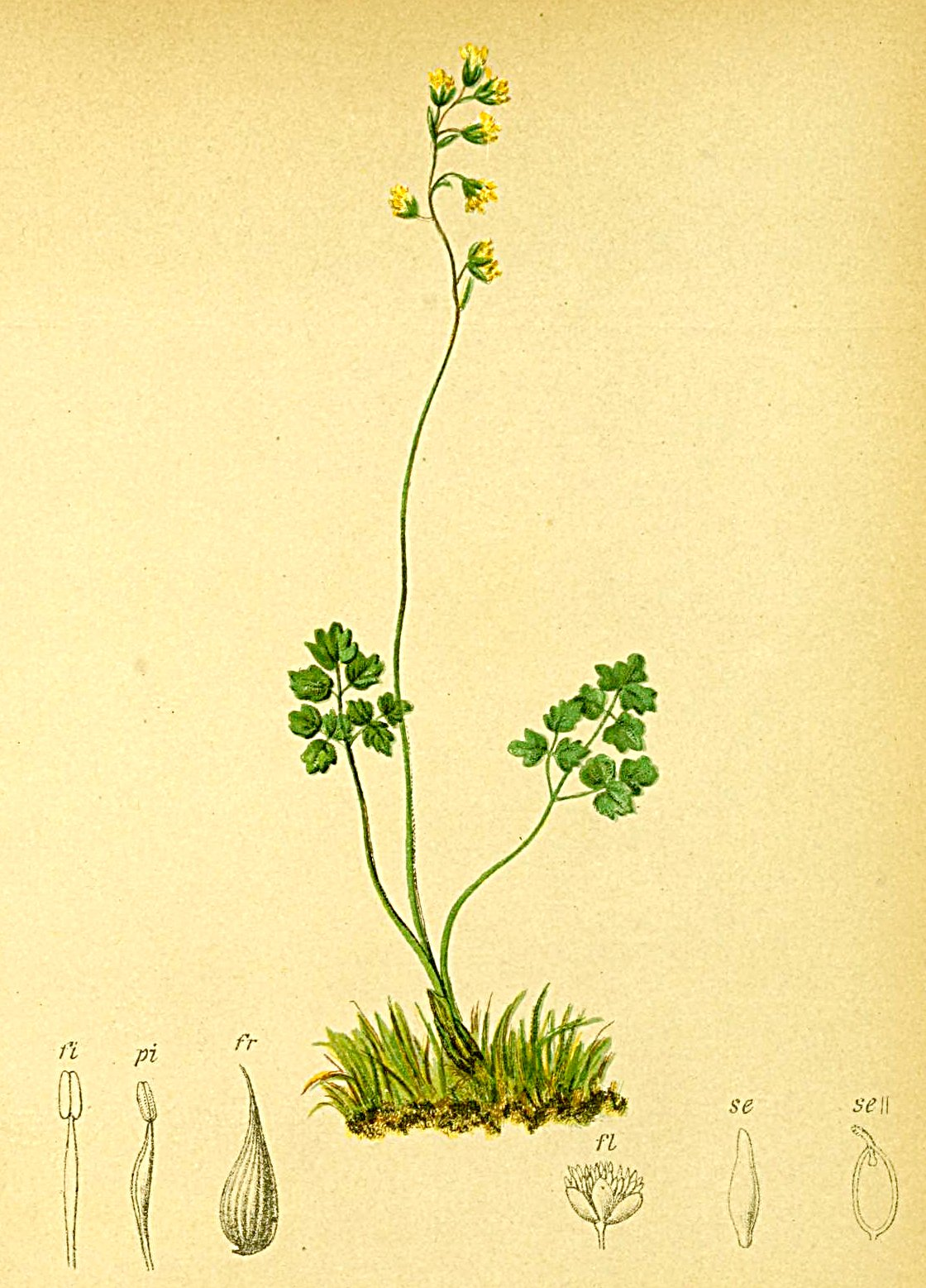

Scientific classification
- Kingdom: Plantae
- Clade: Tracheophytes
- Clade: Angiosperms
- Clade: Eudicots
- Order: Ranunculales
- Family: Ranunculaceae
- Genus: Thalictrum
- Species: T. alpinum

Binomial name
- Thalictrum alpinum L.

= Thalictrum alpinum =

Species of flowering plant in the buttercup family

Thalictrum alpinum is a species of flowering plant in the buttercup family known by the common names alpine meadow-rue and arctic meadow-rue. It is native to Arctic and alpine regions of North America and Eurasia, including Alaska, northern Canada, and Greenland, and it occurs in cold, wet, boggy habitats in high mountains further south.

== Description ==
Alpine meadow-rue is a rhizomatous perennial herb growing up to 5 to 25 cm (2 to 10 in) tall. The stems are upright and usually unbranched and leafless. Most of the leaves form a basal rosette, their compound blades are one to two pinnate and divided into small, triangular-ovate, scalloped leaflets. Each leaflet is longer than it is broad, slightly recurved, shiny dark green above and pale bluish-green below. The inflorescence is a raceme of flowers that arches over as the flowers and fruit develop. Each flower has a bell-shaped calyx of green or purplish sepals bearing up to fifteen long purple stamens tipped with large yellow anthers. There is a single carpel and no petals. The fruit is a dry achene with longitudinal ridges and tipped with a bristle. This species is normally pollinated by wind while other species of meadow-rue are usually insect-pollinated.

=== Phytochemistry ===
The plant contains an alkaloid 'Thalidisine', which is also present in other Thalictrum species.

== Distribution and habitat ==
Alpine meadow-rue has a circumboreal distribution and is found in northern Europe and Asia, Alaska, northern Canada and Greenland as well as mountain ranges further south. Its natural habitat is tundra, open birch woodland, the banks of streams and rivers, the shores of lakes, alpine meadows and boggy areas. It is occasionally found on fens among and on the fringes of coniferous forests.
