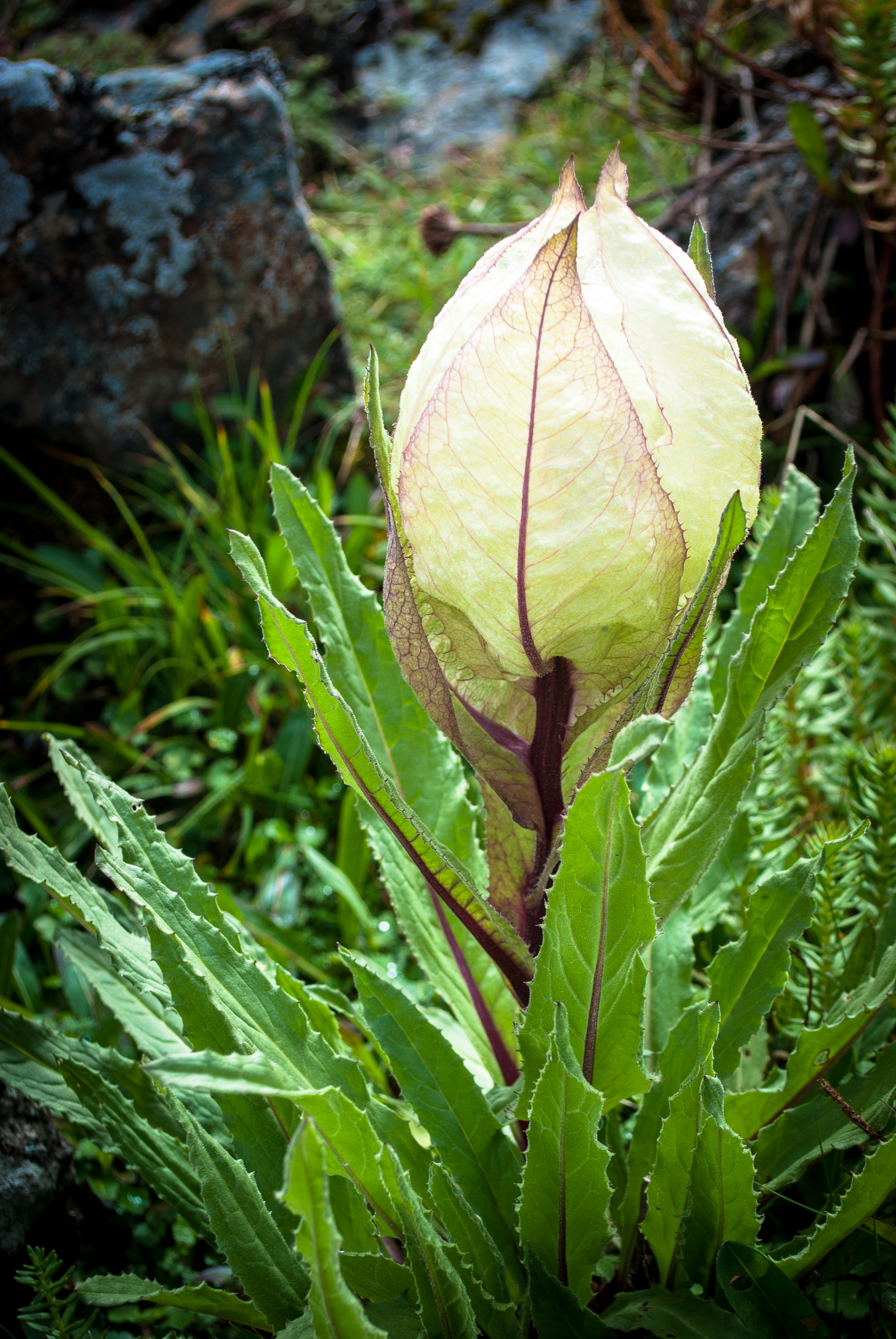

Scientific classification
- Kingdom: Plantae
- Clade: Embryophytes
- Clade: Tracheophytes
- Clade: Angiosperms
- Clade: Eudicots
- Clade: Asterids
- Order: Asterales
- Family: Asteraceae
- Genus: Saussurea
- Species: S. obvallata

Binomial name
- Saussurea obvallata (DC.) Sch.Bip.

Synonyms
- Aplotaxis obvallata DC.; Theodorea obvallata (DC.) Kuntze

= Saussurea obvallata =

Himalayan flowering plant

Saussurea obvallata, commonly known as Brahmakamal, is a species of flowering plant in the Asteraceae. It is native to the Alpine meadows of the Himalayas, in India, Bhutan, Nepal, Pakistan and southwest China at altitudes of 3,700 to 4,600 m.

== Description ==
Saussurea obvallata is a perennial growing to 0.3 m (1 ft). The flowers are hermaphrodite (have both male and female organs) and are pollinated by insects. Flowers bloom in mid-monsoon (July–August) amongst the rocks and grasses of the hillside at an altitudinal range of 3700–4600 m. Flower heads are purple, hidden from view in layers of yellowish-green papery bracts, which provide protection from the cold mountain environment. The flowers can be seen from July through September, after which the above-ground portions of the plant die back, becoming visible again in April.

The Saussurea genus are named for alpine scientist Horace Bénédict de Saussure, while the specific epithet obvallata is derived from obvallatus, meaning "surrounded by wall;" in this case the flower's involucriform bracts.

== Cultural recognition ==
A postal stamp featuring the image of the flower and labeled Sassurea obvallata in binomial nomenclature and Brahma Kamal in the Devanagari script was issued by the Indian government in 1982. Sometime after the new state of Uttarakhand was created in 2007 (changing its name from Uttaranchal, created in 2000), the flower was declared the state flower. The flowers are used as offerings in the hill temples, like the shrines of Badrinath. In India, it is known as "Brahma Kamal". The thick curved root of the plant is applied to bruises and cuts, as part of local medicine.
