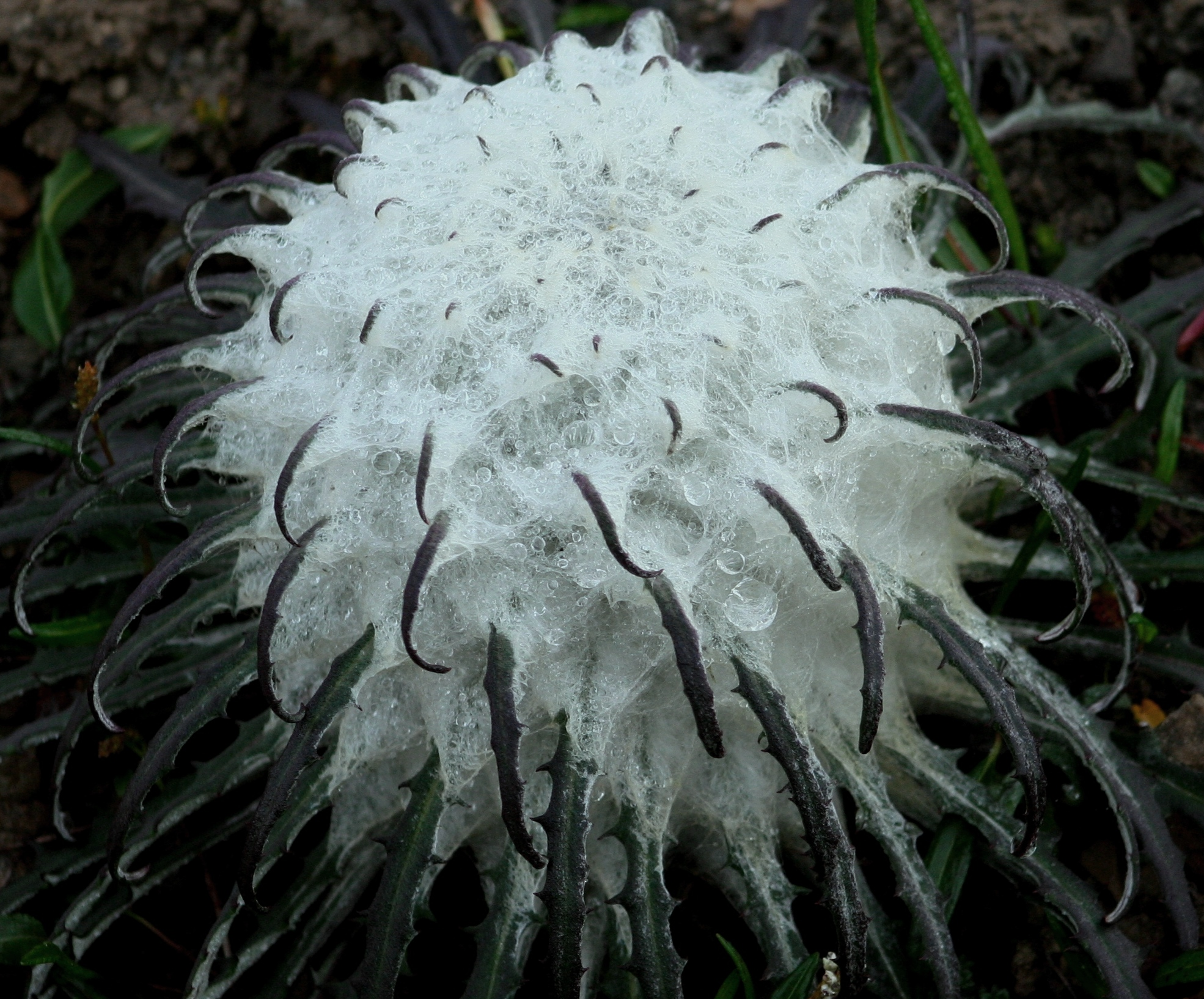

Scientific classification
- Kingdom: Plantae
- Clade: Tracheophytes
- Clade: Angiosperms
- Clade: Eudicots
- Clade: Asterids
- Order: Asterales
- Family: Asteraceae
- Genus: Saussurea
- Species: S. gossypiphora

Binomial name
- Saussurea gossypiphora

= Saussurea gossypiphora =

Species of plant

Saussurea gossypiphora, commonly known as snowball plant (Hindi:कस्तूरी कमल, kastūrī kamal; Nepali:कपासे फूल, kapāsē phūl) is a perennial herbaceous plant belonging to the sunflower family. It is reputed to have medicinal properties according to traditional Chinese medicine. It is native to the Himalayas, and found at altitudes of 4300–5600 m.
