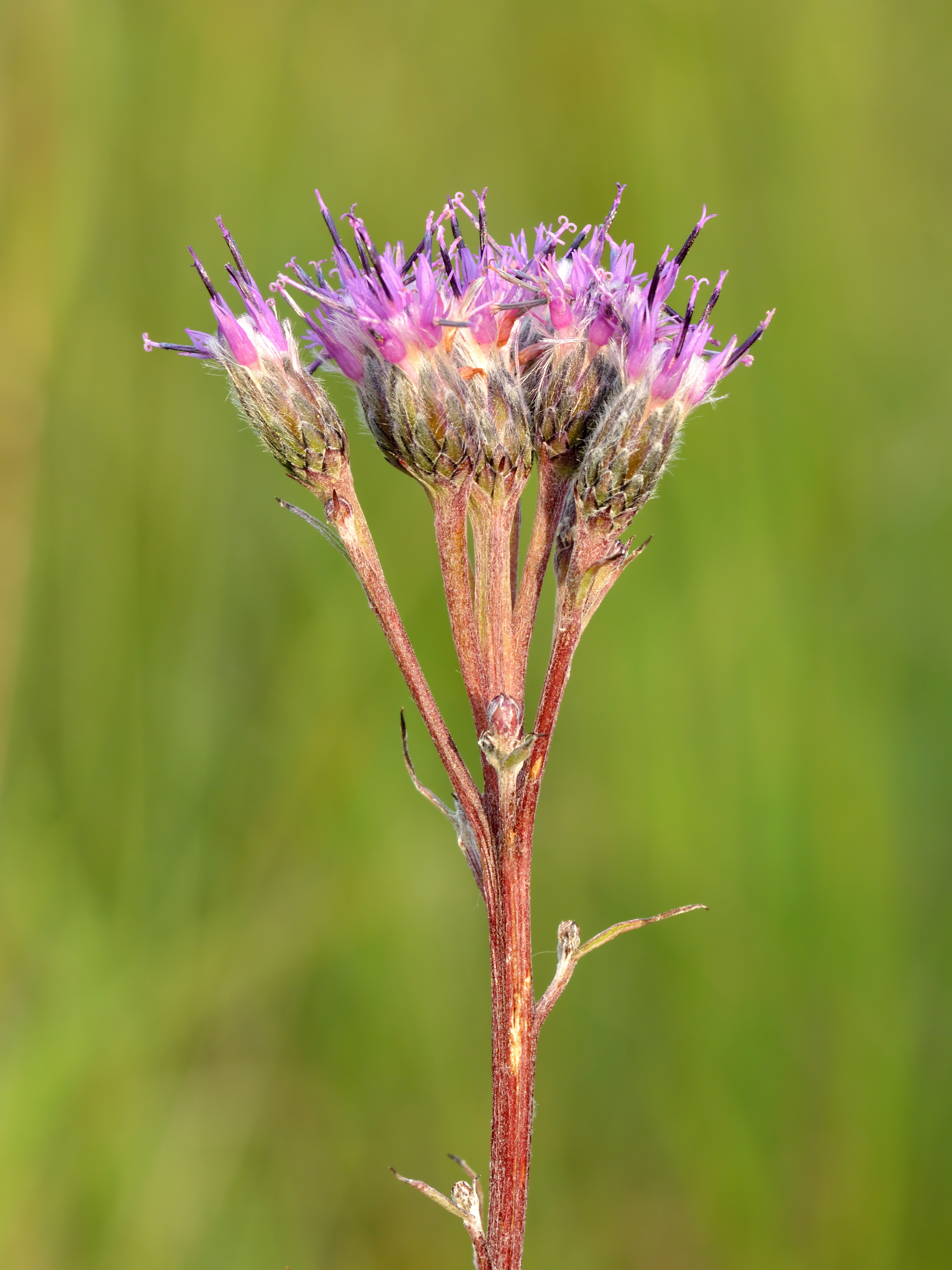
- Saussurea alpina ssp. esthonica

Scientific classification
- Kingdom: Plantae
- Clade: Tracheophytes
- Clade: Angiosperms
- Clade: Eudicots
- Clade: Asterids
- Order: Asterales
- Family: Asteraceae
- Subfamily: Carduoideae
- Tribe: Cardueae
- Subtribe: Saussureinae
- Genus: Saussurea; DC.

Synonyms
- List: Aplotaxis DC.; Bennettia Gray; Cyathidium Lindl. ex Royle; Diplazoptilon Y.Ling; Eriocoryne Wall. ex DC.; Eriocoryne Wall.; Eriostemon Less.; Haplotaxis Endl.; Hemistepta Bunge; Hemisteptia Bunge ex Fisch. & C.A.Mey.; Heterotrichum M.Bieb.; Lagurostemon Cass.; Poecilotriche Dulac; Pilostemon Iljin; Polytaxis Bunge; Theodorea (Cass.) Neck. ex Cass.

= Saussurea =

Genus of flowering plants

Saussurea is a genus of about 300 species of flowering plants in the tribe Cardueae within the family Asteraceae, native to cool temperate and arctic regions of East Asia, Europe, and North America, with the highest diversity in alpine habitats in the Himalayas and East Asia. Common names include saw-wort and snow lotus, the latter used for a number of high altitude species in East Asia.

They are perennial herbaceous plants, ranging in height from dwarf alpine species 5–10 cm (2–4 in) tall, to tall thistle-like plants up to 3 m (9.8 ft) tall. The leaves are produced in a dense basal rosette, and then spirally up the flowering stem. The flowers form in a dense head of small capitula, often surrounded by dense white to purple woolly hairs; the individual florets are also white to purple. The wool is densest in the high altitude species, and aids in the thermoregulation of the flowers, minimising frost damage at night and also preventing ultraviolet light damage from the intense high-altitude sunlight.

De Candolle named the genus after Horace-Bénédict de Saussure (1740–1799) and Nicolas-Théodore de Saussure (1767–1845).

== Uses ==
A number of the high alpine Himalayan species are grown as ornamental plants for their decorative dense woolly flowerheads; they are among the most challenging plants to grow, being adapted to harsh climates from 3,000 to 5,000 m (9,840 to 16,400 ft) altitude, demanding cool temperatures, a very long (up to 8–10 months) winter rest period, and very good soil drainage in humus-rich gravel soils.

=== Traditional uses ===
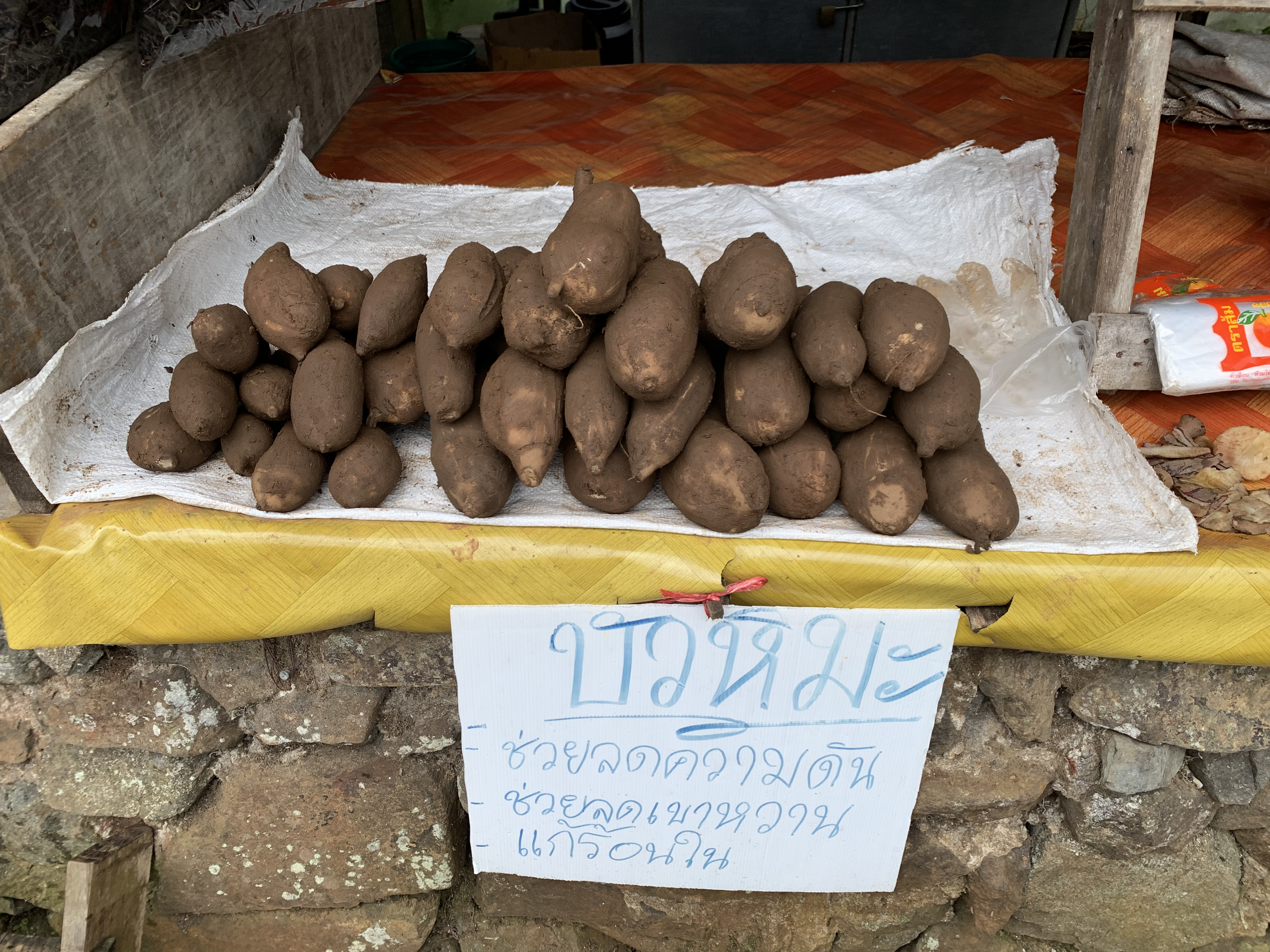
Snow lotus tubers selling in Chiang Rai, Thailand

Costi amari radix or costus root was an important item of Roman trade with India, and is believed to have been the dried root of Saussurea lappa.

Several varieties of snow lotus are used in traditional Tibetan medicine. Saussurea lappa is used a component of the traditional Tibetan medicine Padma 28. Research conducted on the Himalayan medicinal plants by C.P. Kala reveals that the practitioners of Tibetan medicine living in the Pin Valley of Himachal Pradesh use its root for curing dysentery and ulcer. Saussurea laniceps , Saussurea involucrata and Saussurea medusa flowers and stems have long been used in traditional Chinese medicine for the treatment of rheumatoid arthritis, cough with cold, stomachache, dysmenorrhea, and altitude sickness, and has been found to have antiinflammatory and analgesic effects, as well as cardiotonic, abortifacient, anticancer, and antifatigue actions. Saussurea laniceps have been proven to be more effective than Saussurea involucrata and Saussurea medusa.

Saussurea obvallata is one of the most sacred species in India, and has been used for offerings to goddess Nanda Devi for time immemorial.

== Pharmacology ==
Saussurea lappa and has been shown to inhibit the mRNA expression of iNOS by lipopolysaccharide stimulated macrophages, thus reducing nitric oxide production. In rats, high doses of 50–200 milligrams per kilogram of crude ethanolic extract reduced observed inflammation in standard laboratory tests, and 25–100 milligrams per kilogram of the sesquiterpene fraction of the extract reduced several molecular markers of inflammation. Ethanol extracts were shown to have analgesic and antiinflammatory effects at high doses of 75–300 milligrams per kilogram. As the slow-growing wild plant is endangered by collections, a substitute grown in tissue culture has been suggested, which is mostly equivalent. Generally the analgesic and antiinflammatory effects of the plant are much inferior to those of indometacin.

=== Literature and culture ===
In most Chinese martial arts literature, the snow Lotus was classified a rare herb as precious as lingzhi mushroom, and old ginseng.

== Selected species ==
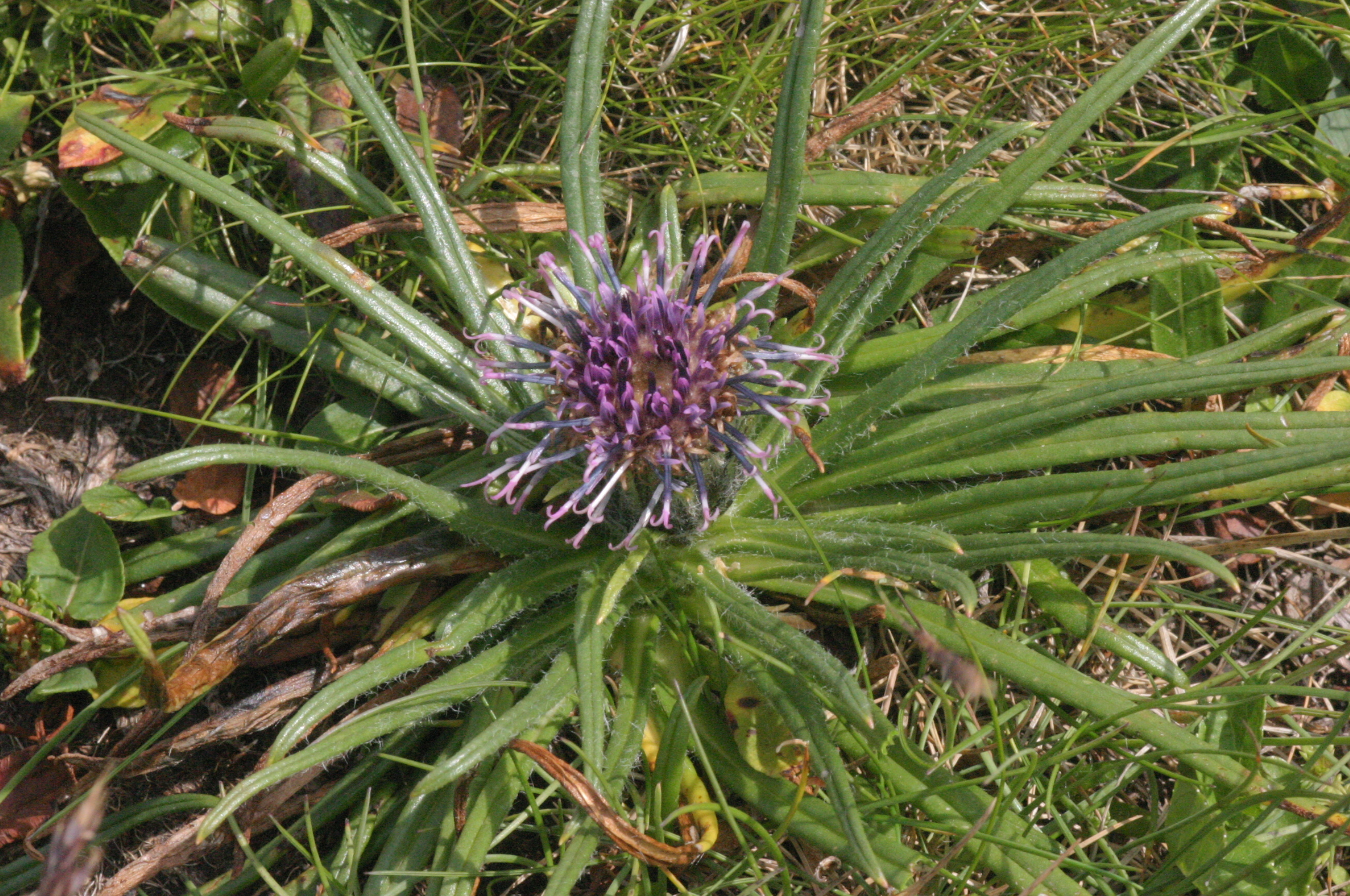
Saussurea pygmaea

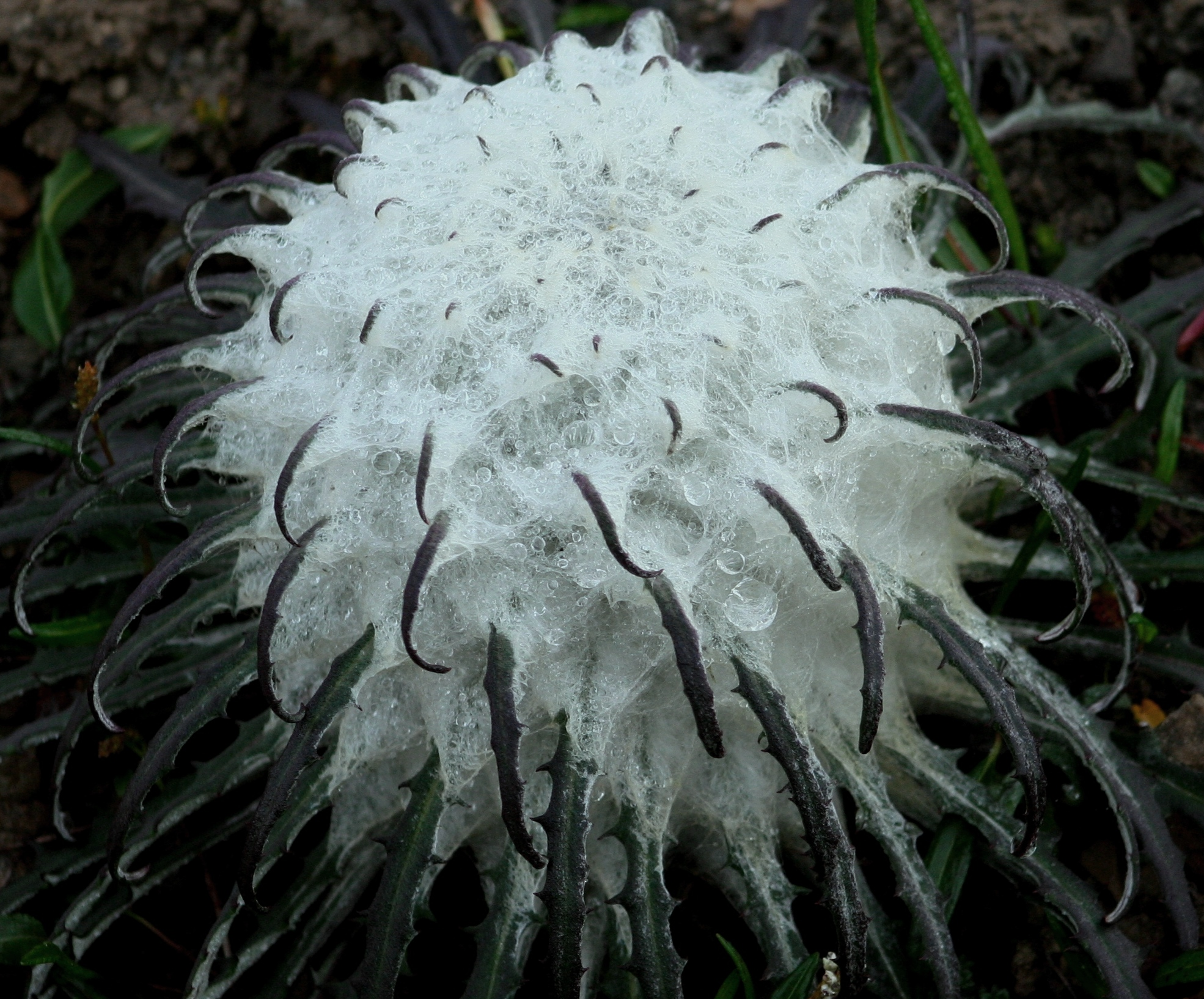
Saussurea gossypiphora

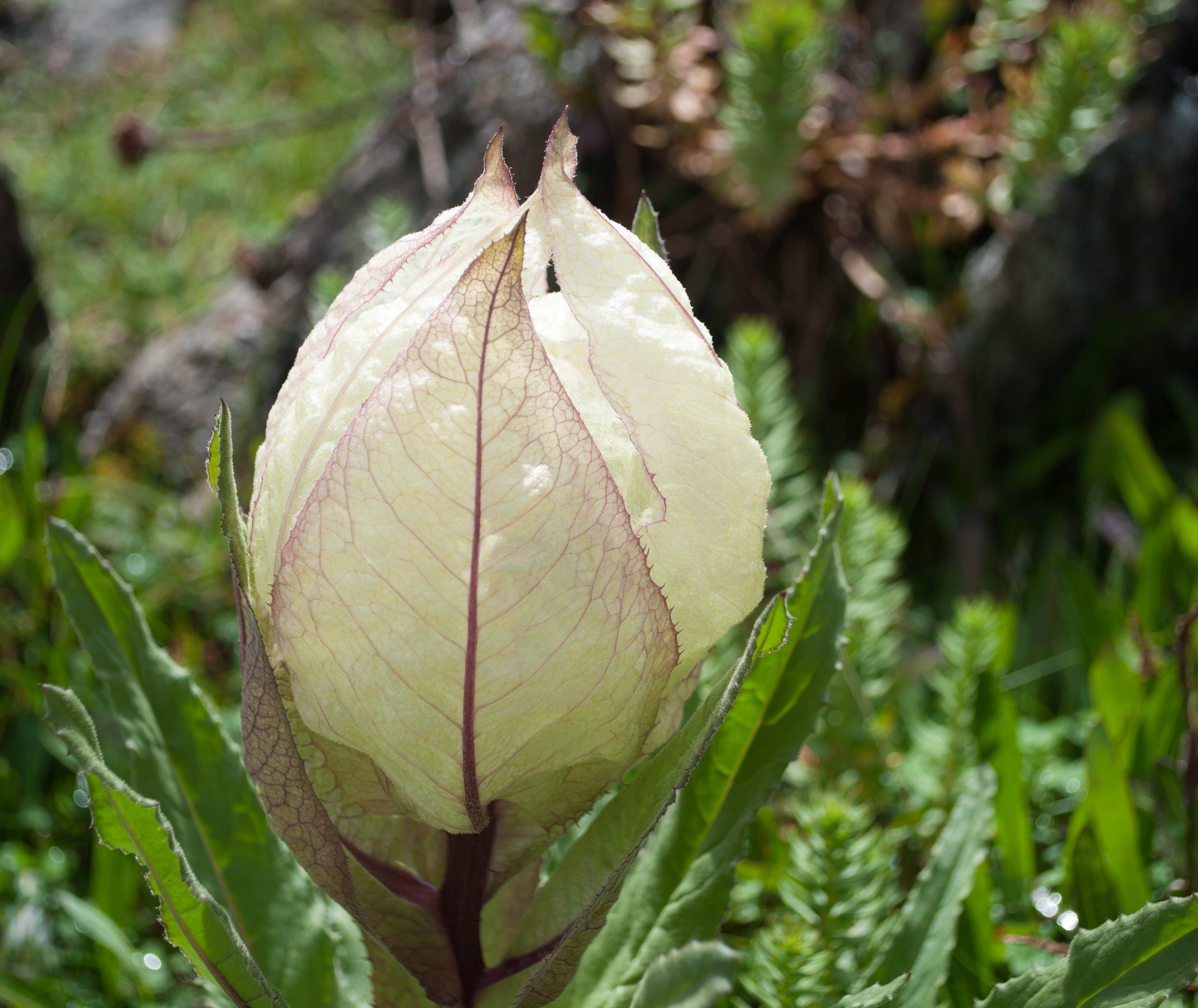
Saussurea obvallata

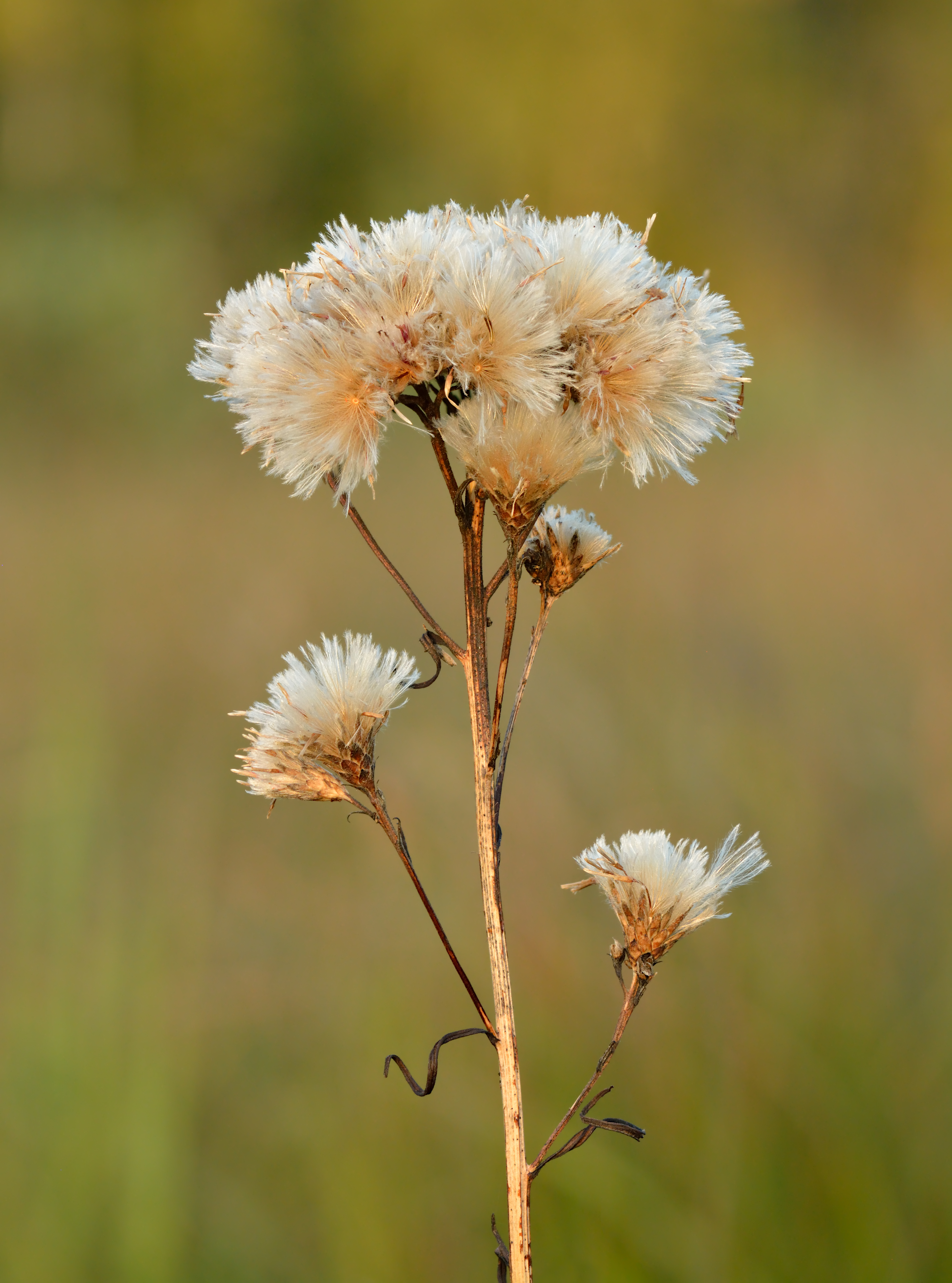
Saussurea alpina with seeds

- Saussurea abnormis. Himalaya.
- Saussurea acrophila. China.
- Saussurea albescens. Western Himalaya.
- Saussurea alpina. common saw-wort. Northern and central Europe, northwest Asia.
- Saussurea amara. China, Russia.
- Saussurea americana. American saw-wort. Western North America.
- Saussurea amurensis. China.
- Saussurea angustifolia. narrowleaf saw-wort. Arctic northeast Asia, Alaska, Canada.
- Saussurea auriculata. Himalaya, western China.
- Saussurea bhutkesh. Himalaya.
- Saussurea bodinieri. China.
- Saussurea bullockii. China.
- Saussurea cana. China.
- Saussurea candolleana. Himalaya.
- Saussurea ceratocarpa. Kashmir.
- Saussurea chinnampoensis. China.
- Saussurea chrysotricha. Himalaya.
- Saussurea controversa. Russia.
- Saussurea cordifolia. China.
- Saussurea costus. Eastern Himalaya.
- Saussurea crispa. Himalaya.
- Saussurea deltoidea. Himalaya, China, Taiwan.
- Saussurea densa. Clustered saw-wort. Arctic northeast Asia, Canada, Montana.
- Saussurea dhwojii. Himalaya.
- Saussurea discolor. Alpine central Europe.
- Saussurea dolichopoda. China.
- Saussurea donkiah. Himalaya.
- Saussurea dutaillyana. China.
- Saussurea dzeurensis. China.
- Saussurea elegans. Caucasus.
- Saussurea epilobioides. China.
- Saussurea esthonica. Eastern Europe.
- Saussurea fastuosa. Himalaya, western China.
- Saussurea formosana. Taiwan.
- Saussurea forrestii. Himalaya.
- Saussurea frondosa. China.
- Saussurea glandulosa. Taiwan.
- Saussurea globosa. China.
- Saussurea gnaphalodes. Himalaya, western China.
- Saussurea gossypiphora. Himalaya.
- Saussurea graminea. China.
- Saussurea graminifolia. Himalaya.
- Saussurea grandiflora. China.
- Saussurea heteromalla. Himalaya.
- Saussurea hieracioides. Himalaya, western China.
- Saussurea hookeri. Himalaya.
- Saussurea involucrata. snow lotus, Himalaya, (Vansemberuu) Mongolia.
- Saussurea iodostegia. China.
- Saussurea japonica. Japan, Korea, northern China.
- Saussurea kanaii. Himalaya.
- Saussurea kanzanensis. Taiwan.
- Saussurea kingii. China.
- Saussurea kiraisanensis. Taiwan.
- Saussurea laminamaensis. Himalaya.
- Saussurea laniceps. China.
- Saussurea lanuginosa. China.
- Saussurea lappa. Himalaya.
- Saussurea leontodontoides. Himalaya.
- Saussurea licentiana. China.
- Saussurea likiangensis. Southwest China.
- Saussurea linearifolia. Himalaya.
- Saussurea longifolia. China.
- Saussurea manshurica. Northern China.
- Saussurea medusa. China.
- Saussurea mongolica. Western China, Mongolia.
- Saussurea namikawae. Himalaya.
- Saussurea neofranchetii. China.
- Saussurea nepalensis. Himalaya.
- Saussurea nigrescens. China.
- Saussurea nishiokae. Himalaya.
- Saussurea nivea. China.
- Saussurea nuda. nutty saw-wort. Alaska.
- Saussurea obvallata. Brahma kamal. Himalaya, northern Burma and south-west China.
- Saussurea oligantha. China.
- Saussurea otophylla. China.
- Saussurea pachyneura. Himalaya.
- Saussurea parviflora. Russia, China.
- Saussurea pectinata. China.
- Saussurea peguensis. China.
- Saussurea phaeantha. China.
- Saussurea pinetorum. China.
- Saussurea piptathera. Himalaya.
- Saussurea platyphyllaria. Himalaya.
- Saussurea polycephala. China.
- Saussurea polystichoides. Himalaya.
- Saussurea populifolia. China.
- Saussurea porcii. Carpathians.
- Saussurea pulchella. Japan, Korea, northern China, eastern Siberia.
- Saussurea pygmaea. Alps, Carpathians.
- Saussurea quercifolia. China.
- Saussurea romuleifolia. China.
- Saussurea roylei. Himalaya.
- Saussurea runcinata. China.
- Saussurea salsa. Russia, China.
- Saussurea simpsoniana. Himalaya.
- Saussurea sobarocephala. China.
- Saussurea spicata. Himalaya.
- Saussurea stafleuana. Himalaya.
- Saussurea stella. China.
- Saussurea stracheyana. Himalaya.
- Saussurea sughoo. Himalaya.
- Saussurea taraxacifolia. Himalaya.
- Saussurea tangutica. Western Asia.
- Saussurea topkegolensis. Himalaya.
- Saussurea tridactyla. Himalaya.
- Saussurea turgaiensis. Russia.
- Saussurea uniflora. Himalaya.
- Saussurea ussuriensis. China, eastern Russia.
- Saussurea vansemberuu. Mongolia.
- Saussurea veitchiana. Central China.
- Saussurea velutina. China.
- Saussurea viscida. sticky saw-wort. Alaska.
- Saussurea weberi. Weber's saw-wort. Rocky Mountains.
- Saussurea werneroides. Himalaya.
- Saussurea yakla. Himalaya.
