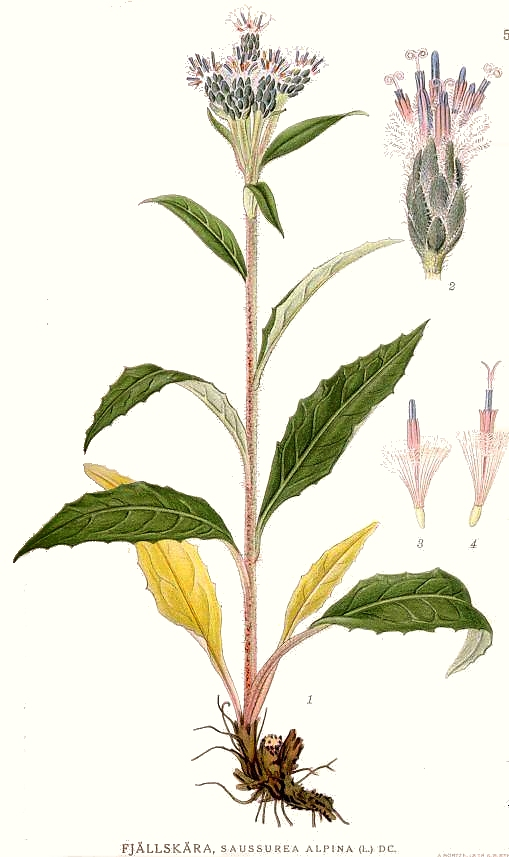

Scientific classification
- Kingdom: Plantae
- Clade: Tracheophytes
- Clade: Angiosperms
- Clade: Eudicots
- Clade: Asterids
- Order: Asterales
- Family: Asteraceae
- Genus: Saussurea
- Species: S. alpina

Binomial name
- Saussurea alpina (L.) DC.

= Saussurea alpina =

Species of flowering plant

Saussurea alpina, the alpine saw-wort, is a species of flowering plant belonging to the family Asteraceae ranging from Europe to Siberia and China.
