= Hypogeal germination =

Epigeal vs. hypogeal germination

Hypogeal germination (from Ancient Greek ὑπόγειος [hupógeios] 'below ground', from ὑπό [hupó] 'below' and γῆ [gê] 'earth, ground') is a botanical term indicating that the germination of a plant takes place below the ground. An example of a plant with hypogeal germination is the pea (Pisum sativum). The opposite of hypogeal is epigeal (above-ground germination).

== Germination ==
Hypogeal germination implies that the cotyledons stay below the ground. The epicotyl (part of the stem above the cotyledon) grows, while the hypocotyl (part of the stem below the cotyledon) remains the same in length. In this way, the epicotyl pushes the plumule above the ground.

Normally, the cotyledon is fleshy, and contains many nutrients that are used for germination.

Because the cotyledon stays below the ground, it is much less vulnerable to, for example, night-frost or grazing. The evolutionary strategy is that the plant produces a relatively low number of seeds, but each seed has a bigger chance of surviving.

Plants that show hypogeal germination need relatively little in the way of external nutrients to grow, therefore they are more frequent on nutrient-poor soils. The plants also need less sunlight, so they can be found more often in the middle of forests, where there is much competition to reach the sunlight.

Plants that show hypogeal germination grow relatively slowly, especially in the first phase. In areas that are regularly flooded, they need more time between floodings to develop. On the other hand, they are more resistant when a flooding takes place. After the slower first phase, the plant develops faster than plants that show epigeal germination.

It is possible that within the same genus one species shows hypogeal germination while another species shows epigeal germination. Some genera in which this happens are:

- Phaseolus: the runner bean (Phaseolus coccineus) shows hypogeal germination, whereas the common bean (Phaseolus vulgaris) shows epigeal germination
- Lilium: see Lily seed germination types
- Araucaria: species in the section Araucaria show hypogeal germination, whereas species in the section Eutacta show epigeal germination

== Phanerocotylar vs. cryptocotylar ==
In 1965, botanist James A. Duke introduced the terms cryptocotylar ("hidden cotyledon") and phanerocotylar ("visible cotyledon") as synonyms for hypogeal and epigeal respectively, because he didn't consider these terms etymologically correct. Later, it was discovered that there are rare cases of species where the germination is epigeal and cryptocotylar such as Rollinia salicifolia. Therefore, divisions have been proposed that take both factors into account.
