= Epigeal germination =

Botanical term

Epigeal vs. hypogeal germination

Epigeal germination (Ancient Greek ἐπίγαιος [epígaios] 'above ground', from ἐπί [epí] 'on' and γῆ [gê] 'earth, ground') is a botanical term indicating that the germination of a plant takes place above the ground. An example of a plant with epigeal germination is the common bean (Phaseolus vulgaris). The opposite of epigeal is hypogeal (underground germination).

| Epi: Above + Geo: Earth | + Germination

== Epigeal germination ==
Epigeal germination implies that the cotyledons are pushed above ground. The hypocotyl elongates while the epicotyl remains the same in length. In this way, the hypocotyl pushes the cotyledon upward.

Normally, the cotyledon itself contains very few nutrients in plants that show this kind of germination. Instead, the first leaflets are already folded up inside it, and photosynthesis starts to take place in it rather quickly.

Because the cotyledon is positioned above the ground it is much more vulnerable to damage like night-frost or grazing.

Plants that show epigeal germination need external nutrients rather quickly in order to develop, so they are more frequent on nutrient-rich soils. The plants also need relatively more sunlight for photosynthesis to take place. Therefore they can be found more often in the field, at the border of forests, or as pioneer species.

Plants that show epigeal germination grow relatively fast, especially in the first phase when the leaflets unfold. Because of this, they occur frequently in areas that experience regular flooding, for example at the river borders in the Amazon region. The fast germination enables the plant to develop before the next flooding takes place. After the faster first phase, the plant develops more slowly than plants that show hypogeal germination.

It is possible that within the same genus one species shows epigeal germination while another species shows hypogeal germination. Some genera in which this happens are:

- Phaseolus: the common bean (Phaseolus vulgaris) shows epigeal germination, whereas the runner bean (Phaseolus coccineus) shows hypogeal germination
- Lilium: see Lily seed germination types
- Araucaria: species in the section Eutacta show epigeal germination, whereas species in the section Araucaria show hypogeal germination

== Phanerocotylar vs. cryptocotylar ==
In 1965, botanist James A. Duke introduced the terms phanerocotylar and cryptocotylar as synonyms for epigeal and hypogeal respectively, because he didn't consider these terms etymologically correct. Later, it was discovered that there are rare cases of species where the germination is epigeal and cryptocotylar. Therefore, divisions have been proposed that take both factors into account.
