= Candling =

Method of observing an embryo inside an egg, using a bright light source

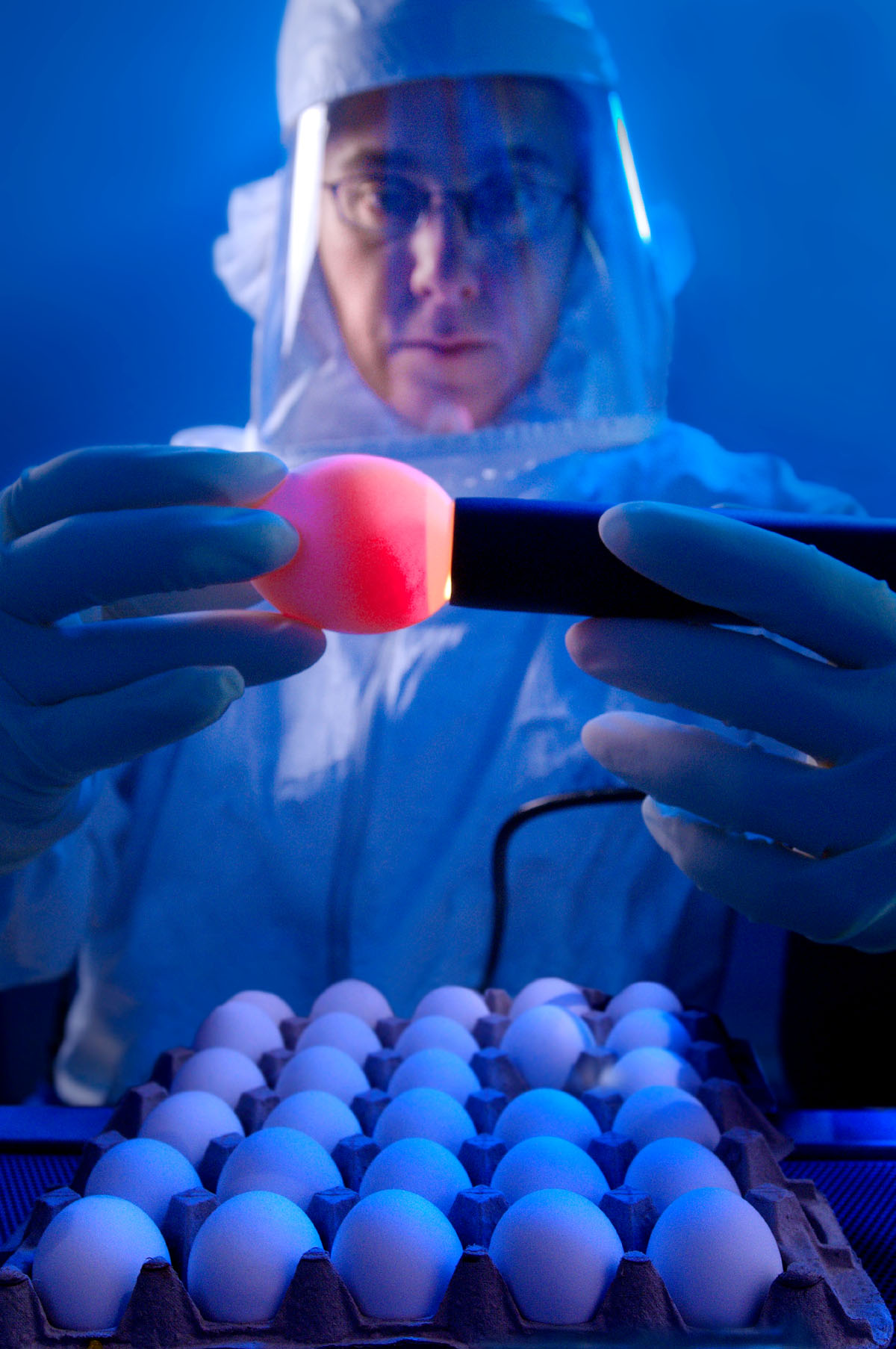
Candling an egg

Candling is a method used in embryology to study the growth and development of an embryo inside an egg. The method uses a bright light source behind the egg to show details through the shell, and is so called because the original sources of light used were candles.

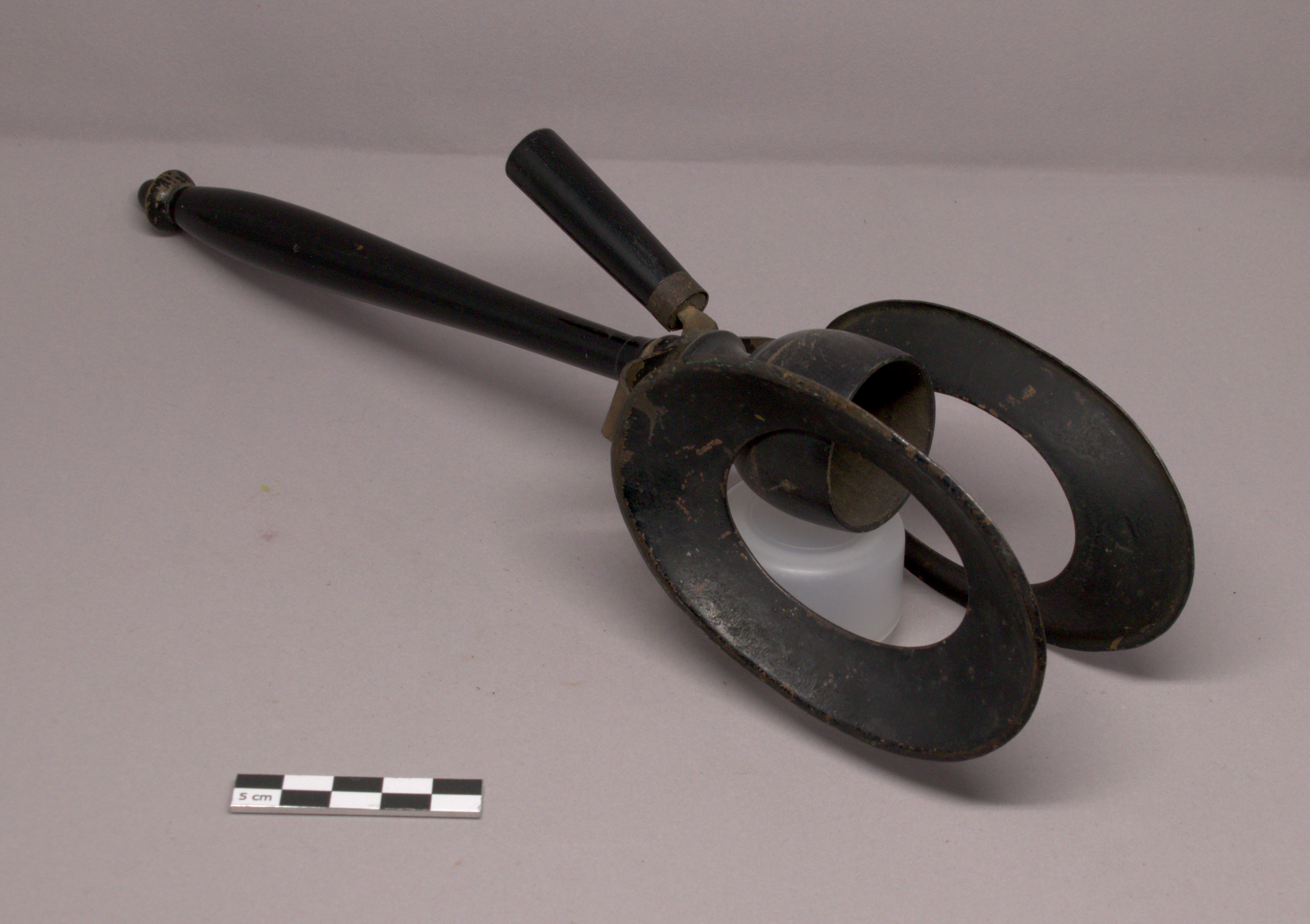
A tool used in the 19th century to hold eggs in front of a light source.

The technique of using light to examine eggs is used in the egg industry to assess the quality of edible eggs.

== Usage ==
Field ornithologists may use candling to gather nesting data, such as the age of the embryos. It is sometimes used as an alternative to egg floatation, a process in which the egg's age is determined by whether it floats or sinks; however, a study on Canada goose eggs determined that candling can overestimate the egg's age and is more biased in this regard than floating. Candling is not possible in birds with dense shells, such as shorebirds.

The practice is also used by veterinarians and exotic bird breeders.

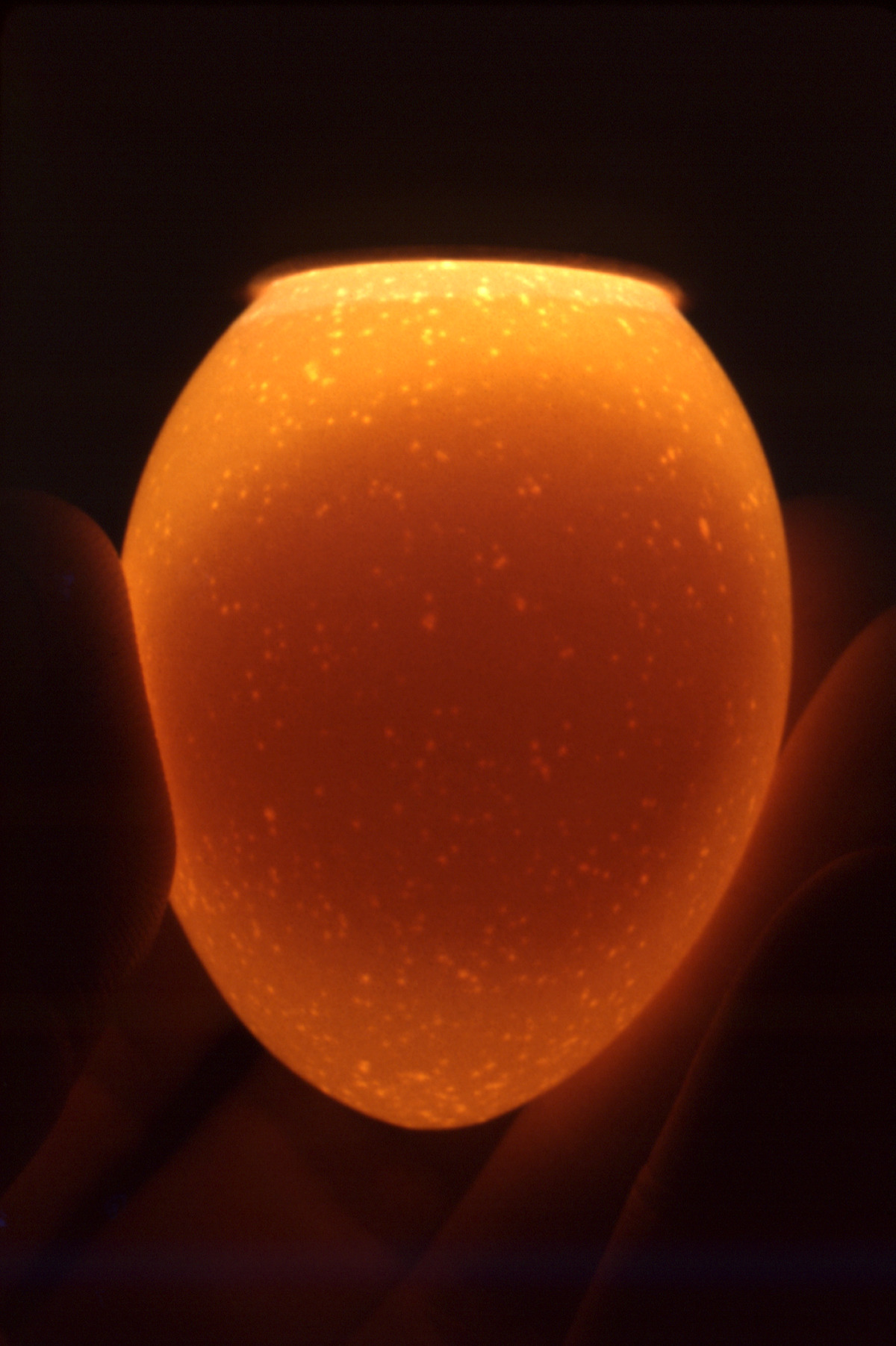
A non-fertile chicken egg, with only a round yolk sac

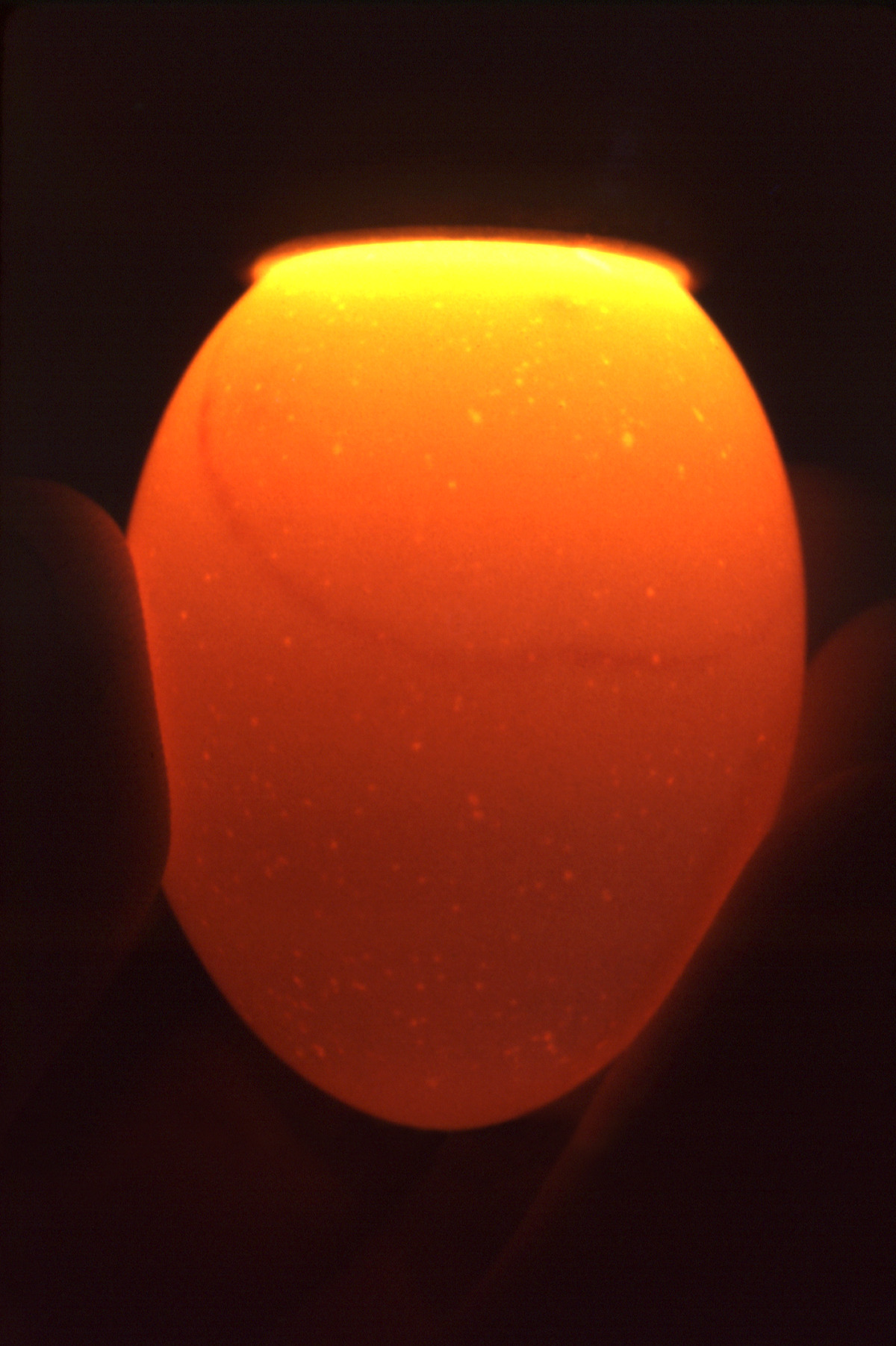
A non-viable fertilized chicken egg, with a thin blood ring encircling the yolk

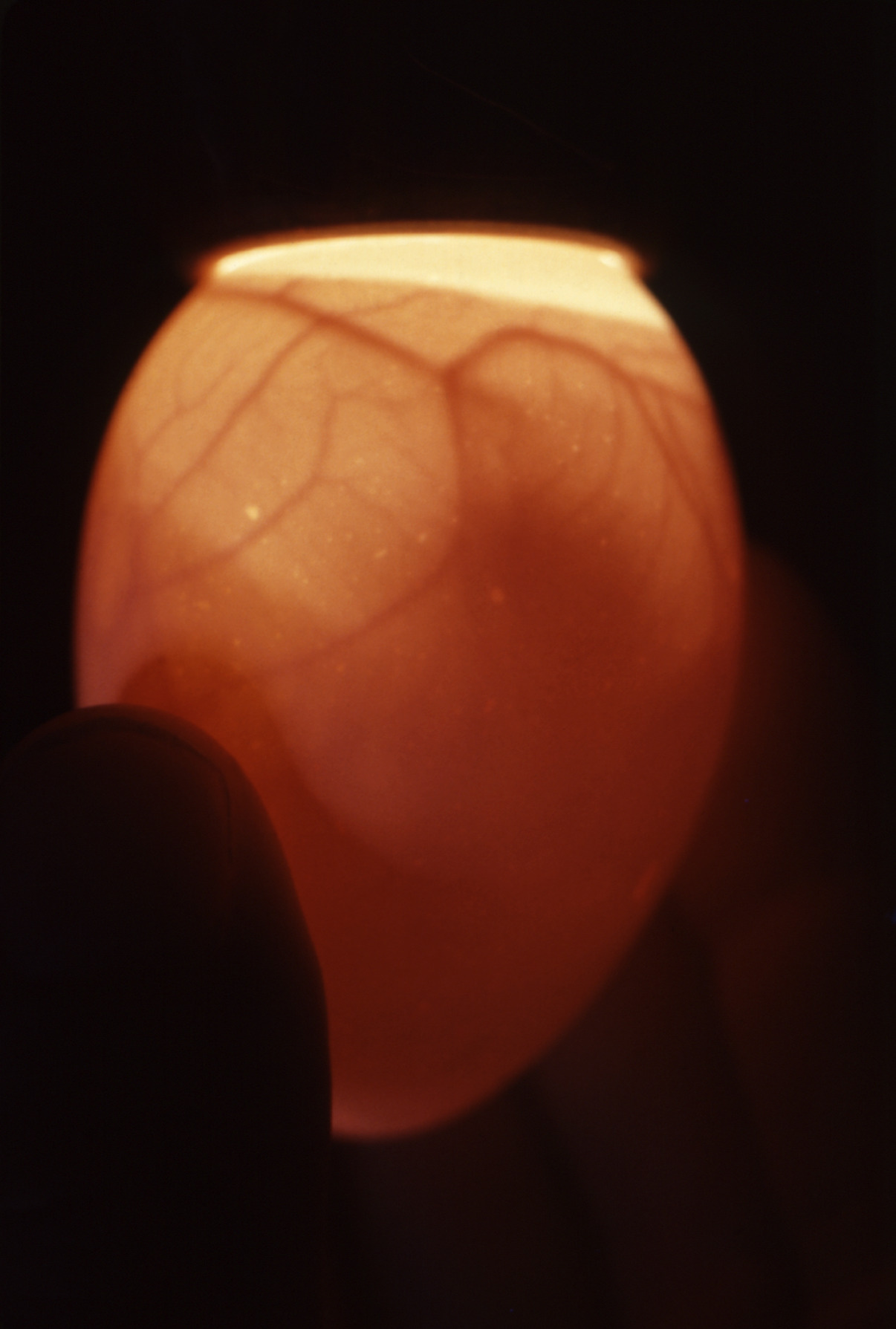
A fertilized chicken egg, 11 days old, with blood vessels surrounding the yolk

== Non-avian usage ==
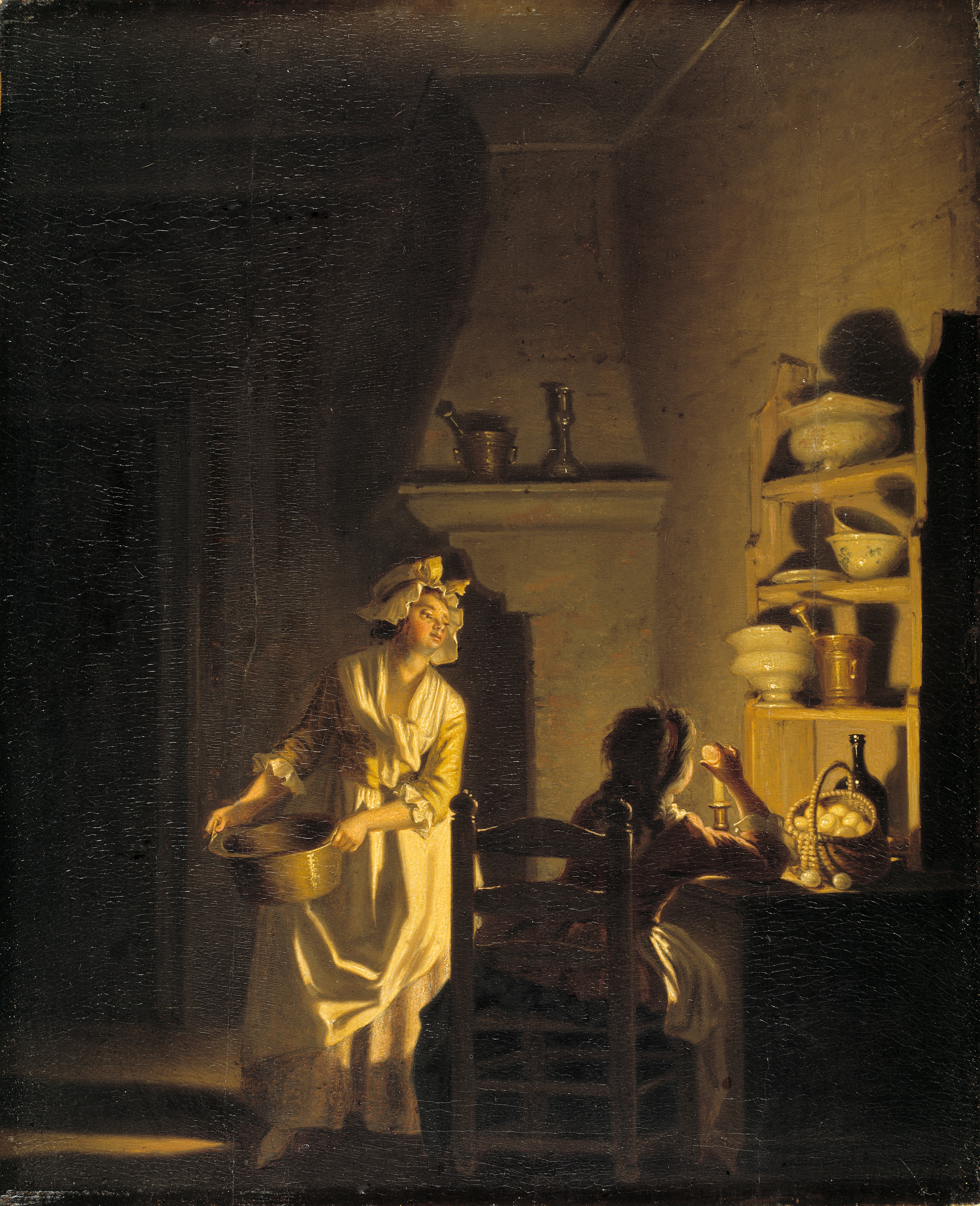
Candling an egg using a candle

=== In plants ===
This technique can also be used to assess the quality and development stage of certain translucent plant seeds, especially those of Lilies and their close relatives. Ripe, viable seeds have a visible embryo within them when viewed in transmitted light, so good seeds can be sorted out from the non-viable seeds and chaff, if desired. Candling is a highly useful method with certain species that germinate erratically or very slowly, as seed germination causes the embryo to enlarge. Candling can thus be used to estimate the optimal time for planting seeds that are being stratified. Care must be taken during candling, as drying or overheating will kill the developing seeds.

=== In lutherie ===
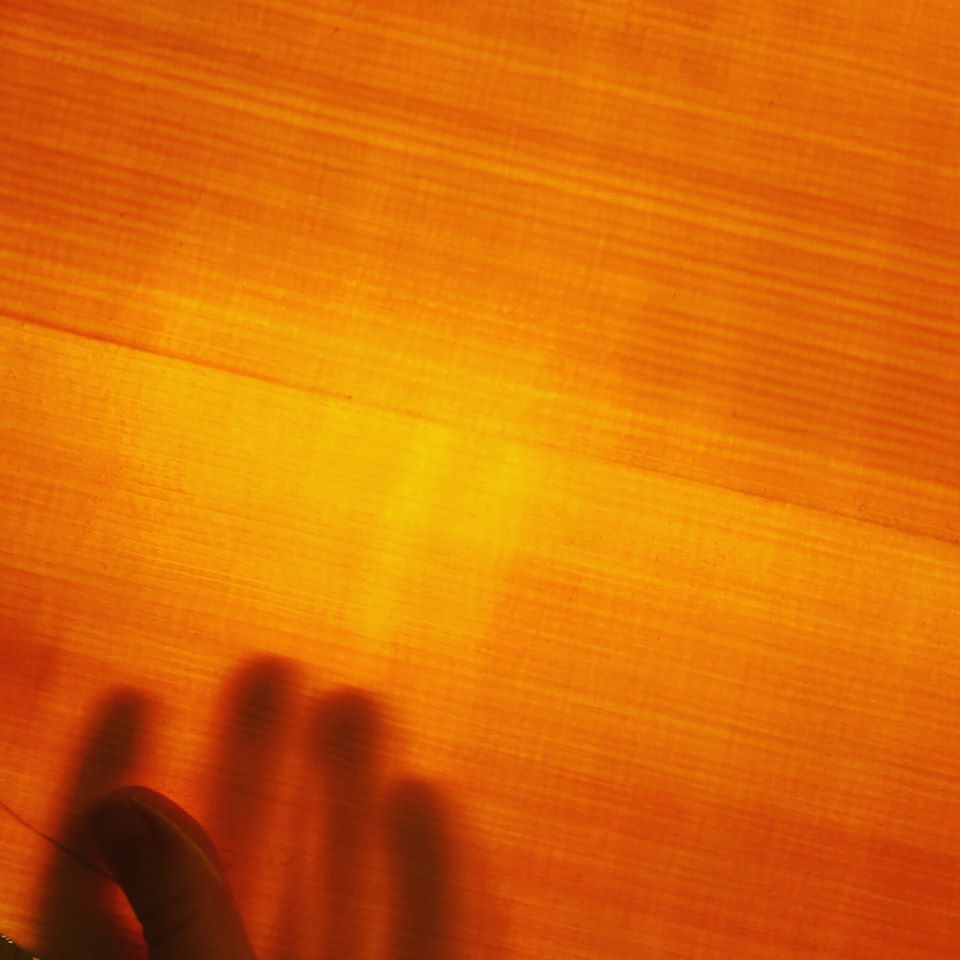
A luthier candling a soundboard to check thickness in the area where the rose will be carved in between adjustments.

In lutherie, candling is sometimes used to check the thickness of the soundboard in various places, especially on lutes and historical guitars. This is especially necessary because these instruments have soundboards which vary in thickness, for instance the area where the rose is carved. It is also used to check for any flaws in the wood, or to check how tight a joint is, for instance on the centre seam of the soundboard.

Traditionally, a candle would be used, hence the name, but usually nowadays a modern light is used, as this is less of a fire risk.
