= Dr. Duke's Phytochemical and Ethnobotanical Databases =

Online database

Dr. Duke's Phytochemical and Ethnobotanical Databases is an online database developed by James A. Duke at the USDA.

The databases report species, phytochemicals, and biological activity, as well as ethnobotanical uses.

The current Phytochemical and Ethnobotanical databases facilitate plant, chemical, bioactivity, and ethnobotany searches. A large number of plants and their chemical profiles are covered, and data are structured to support browsing and searching in several user-focused ways. For example, users can

- get a list of chemicals and activities for a specific plant of interest, using either its scientific or common name
- download a list of chemicals and their known activities in PDF or spreadsheet form
- find plants with chemicals known for a specific biological activity
- display a list of chemicals with their LD toxicity data
- find plants with potential cancer-preventing activity
- display a list of plants for a given ethnobotanical use
- find out which plants have the highest levels of a specific chemical

References to the supporting scientific publications are provided for each specific result. Also included are links to nutritional databases, plants and cancer treatments and other plant-related databases.

The content of the database is licensed under the Creative Commons CC0 public domain.
