= Epicotyl =

Part of a seedling stem of an embryo plant

An epicotyl is important for the beginning stages of a plant's life. It is the region of a seedling stem above the stalks of the seed leaves of an embryo plant. It grows rapidly, showing hypogeal germination, and extends the stem above the soil surface. The hypocotyl, the region of the stem between the point of attachment of the cotyledons and the root - forms a hook during hypogeal germination and pushes out of the soil, allowing the more delicate tissues of the plumules and apical meristem to avoid damage from pushing through the soil. The epicotyl will expand and form the point of attachment of the shoot apex and leaf primordia or "first true leaves". Cotyledons may remain below ground or be pushed up above ground with the growing stem depending on the plant species in question.

In plant physiology, the epicotyl is the embryonic shoot above the cotyledons. In most plants the epicotyl will eventually develop into the leaves of the plant. In dicots, the hypocotyl is what appears to be the base stem under the spent withered cotyledons, and the shoot just above that is the epicotyl. In monocot plants, the first shoot that emerges from the ground or from the seed is the epicotyl, from which the first shoots and leaves emerge.

Lengthening of the epicotyl is thought to be controlled by the phytochrome photoreceptors.

== See also ==
- Hypocotyl
- Radicle
- Plumule
