= Cotyledon =

Embryonic leaf first appearing from a germinating seed

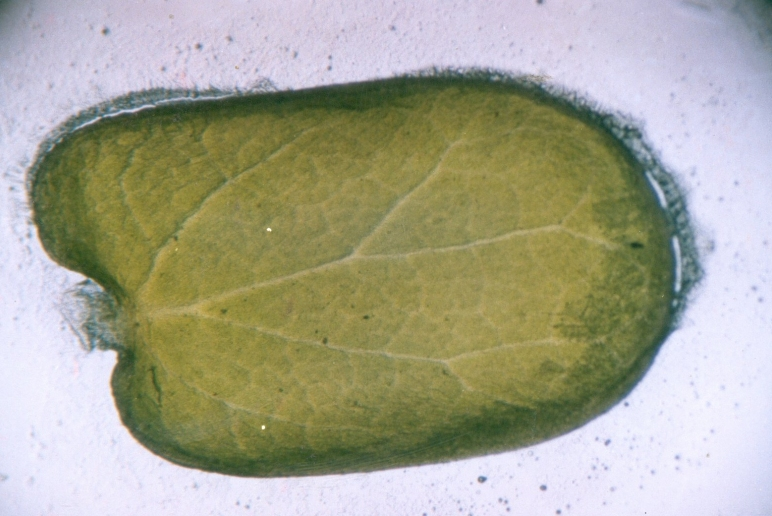
Cotyledon from a Judas-tree (Cercis siliquastrum, a dicot) seedling

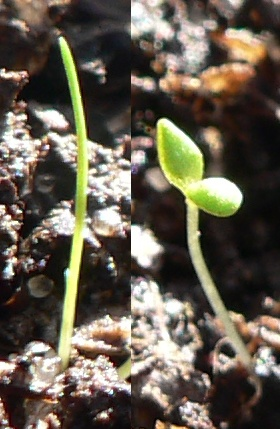
Comparison of a monocot and dicot sprouting. The visible part of the monocot plant (left) is actually the first true leaf produced from the meristem; the cotyledon itself remains within the seed.

A cotyledon (/ˌkɒtɪˈliːdən/ KOT-ih-LEE-dən) (Note: from Latin cotyledon; from Ancient Greek κοτυληδών (kotulēdṓn) 'cavity, small cup, any cup-shaped hollow'; gen. κοτυληδόνος (kotulēdónos), from κοτύλη (kotúlē) 'cup, bowl') is a "seed leaf" – a significant part of the embryo within the seed of a plant – and is formally defined as "the embryonic leaf in seed-bearing plants, one or more of which are the first to appear from a germinating seed." Botanists use the number of cotyledons present as one characteristic to classify the flowering plants (angiosperms): species with one cotyledon are called monocotyledonous ("monocots"); plants with two embryonic leaves are termed dicotyledonous ("dicots"). Many orchids with minute seeds have no identifiable cotyledon, and are regarded as acotyledons. The Dodders (Cuscuta spp.) also lack cotyledons, as does the African tree Mammea africana (Calophyllaceae). A very small number of dicots have more than two cotyledons, with perhaps Psittacanthus schiedeanus being the most extreme, having up to twelve.

In the case of dicot seedlings whose cotyledons are photosynthetic, the cotyledons are functionally similar to leaves. However, true leaves and cotyledons are developmentally distinct. Cotyledons form during embryogenesis, along with the root and shoot meristems, and are therefore present in the seed prior to germination. True leaves, however, form post-embryonically (i.e. after germination) from the shoot apical meristem, which generates subsequent aerial portions of the plant.

The cotyledon of grasses and many other monocotyledons is a highly modified leaf composed of a scutellum and a coleoptile. The scutellum is a tissue within the seed that is specialized to absorb stored food from the adjacent endosperm. The coleoptile is a protective cap that covers the plumule (precursor to the stem and leaves of the plant).

Gymnosperm seedlings also have cotyledons. Gnetophytes, cycads, and ginkgos all have 2, whereas in conifers they are often variable in number (multicotyledonous), with 2 to 24 cotyledons forming a whorl at the top of the hypocotyl (the embryonic stem) surrounding the plumule. Within each species, there is often still some variation in cotyledon numbers, e.g. Monterey pine (Pinus radiata) seedlings have between 5 and 9, and Jeffrey pine (Pinus jeffreyi) 7 to 13 (Mirov 1967), but other species are more fixed, with e.g. Mediterranean cypress always having just two cotyledons. The highest number reported is for big-cone pinyon (Pinus maximartinezii), with 24 (Farjon & Styles 1997).

Cotyledons may be ephemeral, lasting only days after emergence, or persistent, enduring at least a year on the plant. The cotyledons contain (or in the case of gymnosperms and monocotyledons, have access to) the stored food reserves of the seed. As these reserves are used up, the cotyledons may turn green and begin photosynthesis, or may wither as the first true leaves take over food production for the seedling.

== Epigeal versus hypogeal development ==
Schematic of epigeal vs hypogeal germination

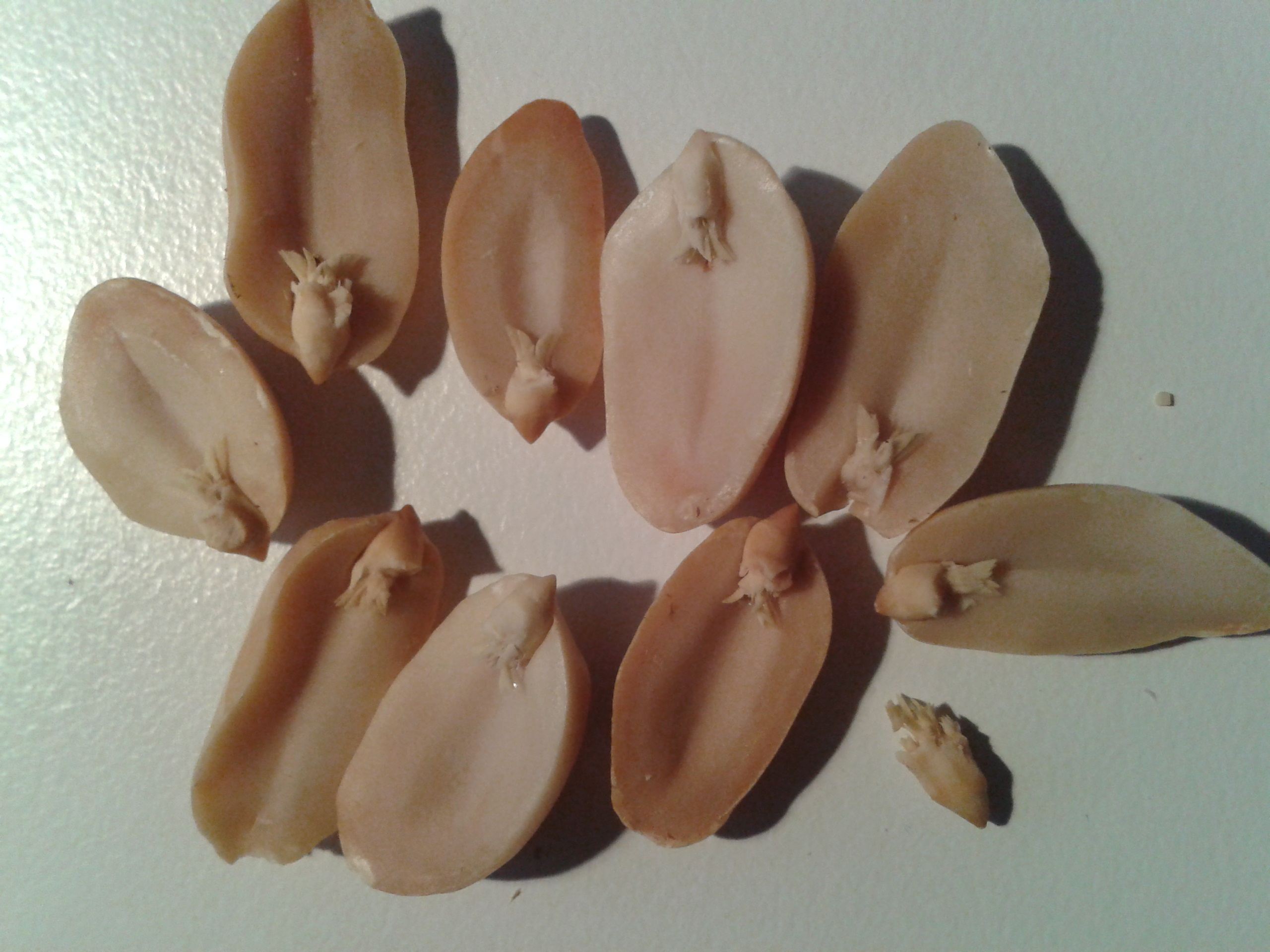
Peanut seeds split in half, showing the embryos with cotyledons and primordial root

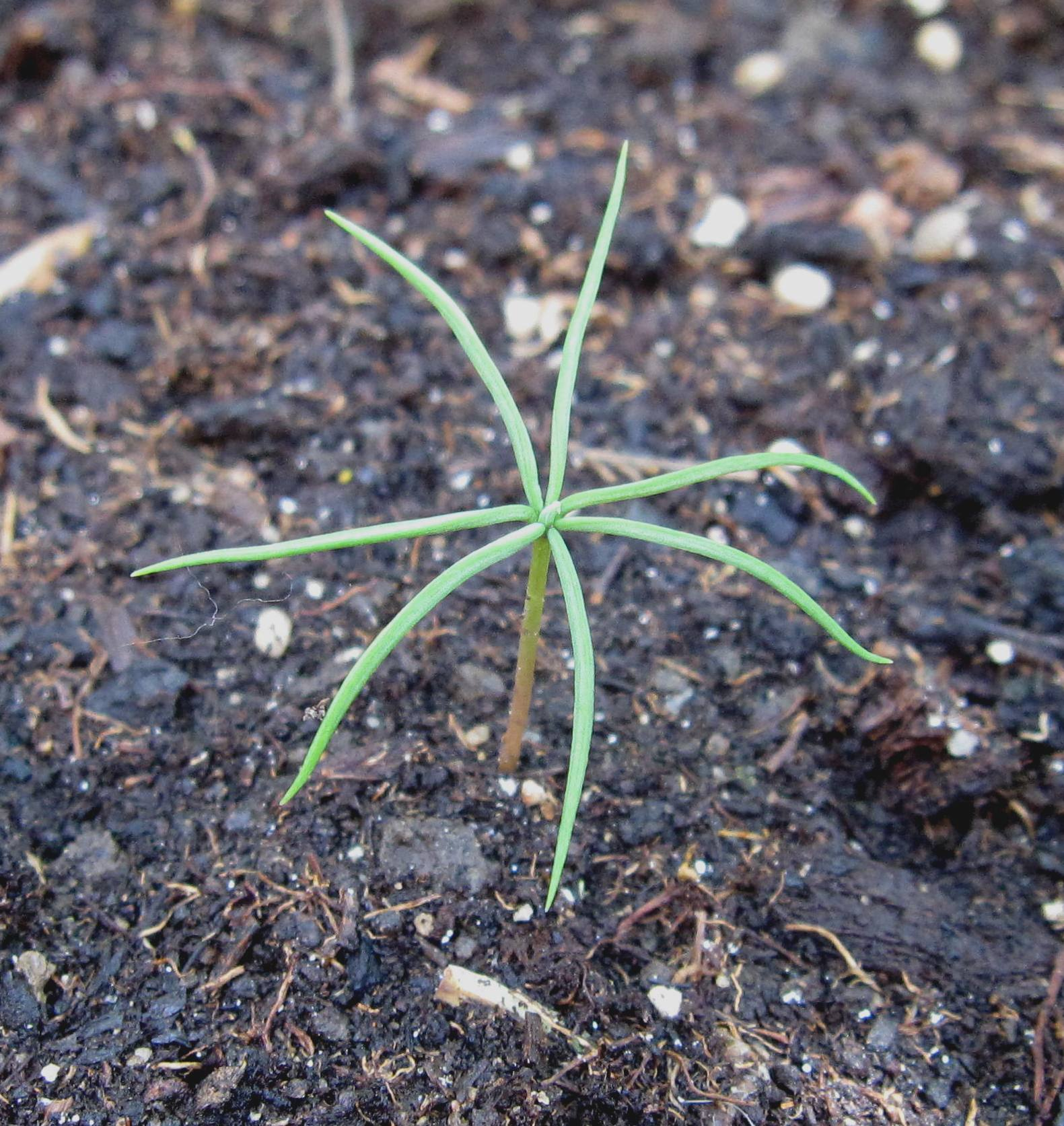
Two-week-old Douglas fir (a conifer) with seven cotyledons

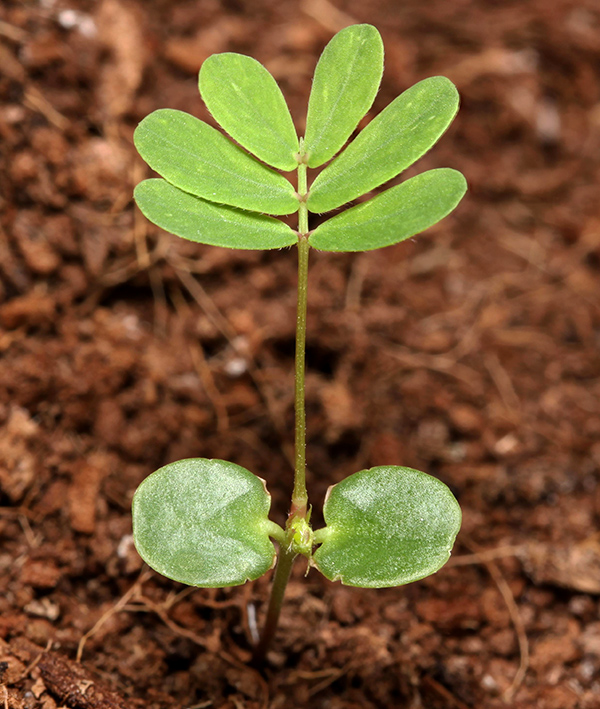
Mimosa pudica (a dicot) seedling with two cotyledons and the first "true" leaf with six leaflets

Cotyledons may be either epigeal, expanding on the germination of the seed, throwing off the seed shell, rising above the ground, and perhaps becoming photosynthetic; or hypogeal, not expanding, remaining below ground and not becoming photosynthetic. The latter is typically the case where the cotyledons act as a storage organ, as in many nuts and acorns.

Hypogeal plants have (on average) significantly larger seeds than epigeal ones. They are also capable of surviving if the seedling is clipped off, as meristem buds remain underground (with epigeal plants, the meristem is clipped off if the seedling is grazed). The tradeoff is whether the plant should produce a large number of small seeds, or a smaller number of seeds which are more likely to survive.

The ultimate development of the epigeal habit is represented by a few plants, mostly in the family Gesneriaceae in which the cotyledon persists for a lifetime. In Streptocarpus wendlandii of South Africa, one cotyledon grows to be up to 75 cm (30 in) in length and up to 61 cm (24 in) wide, the largest cotyledon of any dicot, and exceeded only by the monocot Lodoicea.

Related plants may show a mixture of hypogeal and epigeal development, even within the same plant family. Groups which contain both hypogeal and epigeal species include, for example, the Southern Hemisphere conifer family Araucariaceae, the pea family, Fabaceae, and the genus Lilium (see Lily seed germination types). The frequently garden grown common bean, Phaseolus vulgaris, is epigeal, while the closely related runner bean, Phaseolus coccineus, is hypogeal.

== History ==
The term cotyledon was coined by Marcello Malpighi (1628–1694). (Note: The Oxford English Dictionary attributes the term to Linnaeus (1707–1778) "1751 Linnaeus Philos. Bot. 54. Cotyledon, corpus laterale seminis, bibulum, caducum" and 89, by analogy with a similar structure of the same name in the placenta.) John Ray was the first botanist to recognize that some plants have two and others only one, and eventually the first to recognize the immense importance of this fact to systematics, in Methodus plantarum (1682).

Theophrastus (3rd or 4th century BC) and Albertus Magnus (13th century) may also have recognized the distinction between the dicotyledons and monocotyledons.

== Bibliography ==
- Linnaeus, Carl (1755) [1751]. Philosophia botanica : in qua explicantur fundamenta botanica cum definitionibus partium, exemplis terminorum, observationibus rariorum, adiectis figuris aeneis. originally published simultaneously by R. Kiesewetter (Stockholm) and Z. Chatelain (Amsterdam). Vienna: Joannis Thomae Trattner.
- Mirov, N. T. (1967). The Genus Pinus. Ronald Press Company, New York.
- Farjon, A. & Styles, B. T. (1997). Pinus (Pinaceae). Flora Neotropica Monograph 75: 221–224.
- "Cotyledon". Oxford English Dictionary (online ed.). Oxford University Press. (Subscription or participating institution membership required.)
- Short, Emma; George, Alex (2013). A primer of botanical Latin with vocabulary. New York: Cambridge University Press. ISBN 9781107693753.
