= Hypocotyl =

Plant part

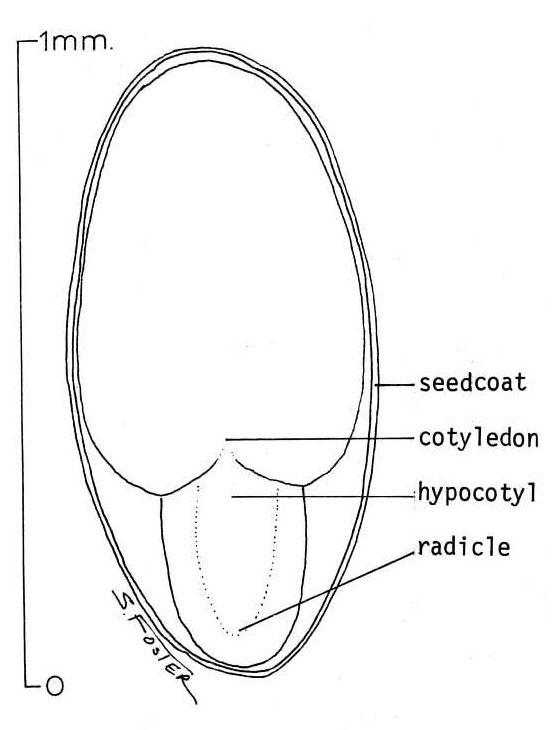
Diagram of Scouler's willow (Salix scouleriana) seed, indicating position of hypocotyl.

The hypocotyl (short for "hypocotyledonous stem", meaning "below seed leaf") is the stem of a germinating seedling, found below the cotyledons (seed leaves) and above the radicle (root).

== Eudicots ==
As the plant embryo grows at germination, it sends out a shoot called a radicle that becomes the primary root, and then penetrates down into the soil. After emergence of the radicle, the hypocotyl emerges and lifts the growing tip (usually including the seed coat) above the ground, bearing the embryonic leaves (called cotyledons), and the plumule that gives rise to the first true leaves. The hypocotyl is the primary organ of extension of the young plant and develops into the stem. The most massive hypocotyl is that of Myrmecodia lamii which can be 70 cm (28 in) in height by 45 cm (18 in) wide, and is filled with chambers and passageways used by their ant symbionts

== Monocots ==
The early development of a monocot seedling like cereals and other grasses is somewhat different. A structure called the coleoptile, essentially a part of the cotyledon, protects the young stem and plumule as growth pushes them up through the soil. A mesocotyl—that part of the young plant that lies between the seed (which remains buried) and the plumule—extends the shoot up to the soil surface, where secondary roots develop from just beneath the plumule. The primary root from the radicle may then fail to develop further. The mesocotyl is considered to be partly hypocotyl and partly cotyledon (see seed).

Not all monocots develop like the grasses. The onion develops in a manner similar to the first sequence described above, the seed coat and endosperm (stored food reserve) pulled upwards as the cotyledon extends. Later, the first true leaf grows from the node between the radicle and the sheath-like cotyledon, breaking through the cotyledon to grow past it.

== Storage organ ==
In some plants, the hypocotyl becomes enlarged as a storage organ. Examples include cyclamen, gloxinia and celeriac. In cyclamen this storage organ is called a tuber.

== Hypocotyl elongation assay ==
One of the widely used assays in the field of photobiology is the investigation of the effect of changes in light quantity and quality on hypocotyl elongation. It is frequently used to study the growth promoting vs. growth repressing effects of application of plant hormones like ethylene. Under normal light conditions, hypocotyl growth is controlled by a process called photomorphogenesis, while shading the seedlings evokes a rapid transcriptional response which negatively regulates photomorphogenesis and results in increased rates of hypocotyl growth. This rate is highest when plants are kept in complete darkness mediated by a process called skotomorphogenesis, which contrasts photomorphogenesis.

== See also ==
- Epicotyl
- Monocotyledon
- Dicotyledon
