= Lily seed germination types =

Lilies seed germination is classified as either epigeal or hypogeal. These classifications may be further refined as immediate or delayed. Whether a lily is epigeal or hypogeal may be related to survival strategies developed according to the climate where the lily originated. Epigeal lilies evolved in moderate climates. Hypogeal lilies evolved in harsher habitats where it would be advantageous to store food in a bulb, and later send up leaves in the spring.

== Epigeal Lilies ==
Asiatic lilies include species of Lilium lancifolium (syn.tigrinum), L. cernuum, L. davidii, L. maximowiczii, L. macultum, L. hollandicum, L. amabile, L. pumilum, L. concolor, and L. bulbiferum. Epigeal trumpet lily species are L. leucanthum, L. regale, L. sargentiae, L. sulphureum, L. rosthornii and L. henryi. Many interdivisional hybrids also fall into the epigeal category. Epigeal lilies germinate under moist, warm conditions (approximately 70°F) in one stage, taking about 14 days. One stage means that they send up a leaf right away.

== Hypogeal Lilies ==
Oriental lily species, such as L. auratum, L. speciosum, L. nobilissimum, L. rubellum, L. alexandrae, and L. japonicum and Martagon species L. martagon, L. hansonii, L. medeoloides, and L. tsingtauense, are all hypogeal. Hypogeal lilies require two or more stages with variations of temperature particular to each stage. For hypogeal lilies, the first stage of germination takes place entirely underground, where the bulb is created. Hypogeals require a warm period of 3 months at 70°F, followed by a 3-month period at 40°F. A juvenile leaf appears in the second stage. The tiny bulbs are then planted in a warm area, usually outdoors.

== Double Hypogeal Lilies ==
Double hypogeal lilies are the hardest to germinate and need multiple alternating periods of warm and cold. The exact sequence varies by species. Lilies that require these special conditions are often adapted to very specific conditions, and may be rare.

== Sources ==
- Halinar, J.C. "Growing Lilies from Seeds," Pacific Northwest Lily Society Bulletin, vol. 16, no.2 (1997).
- https://web.archive.org/web/20100507211032/http://www.lilies.org/growingfromseed.html
- https://web.archive.org/web/20060129212914/http://www.lilies.org.uk/html/propagation.html
- https://web.archive.org/web/20060416081129/http://www.lilies.org/types.html
