= James A. Duke =

American botanist (1929–2017)

James A. Duke (4 April 1929 – 10 December 2017) was an American botanist. He was the author of numerous publications on botanical medicine, including the CRC Handbook of Medicinal Herbs. He was well known for his 1997 bestseller, The Green Pharmacy. He developed the Dr. Duke's Phytochemical and Ethnobotanical Databases at the USDA.

== Biography ==
Jim Duke was born in Birmingham, Alabama. He received his doctorate in botany from the University of North Carolina in 1961. While in college, he played in a Dixieland Jazz Band. He wrote poems set to music about herbs, their proper and common names, and some of their properties. During the late 1970s, he was chief of the Plant Taxonomy Laboratory, Plant Genetics and Germplasm Institute of the Agricultural Research Service, U.S. Department of Agriculture. He taught at the Maryland University of Integrative Health (formerly Tai Sophia) in Columbia, Maryland and led eco-botanical tours specializing in ethnobotany.

Duke's work is cited with approval by Andrew Weil, a physician who maintains a health website that includes alternative medicine. Weil calls Duke "a leading authority on healing herbs".

== Books by Duke ==
- Duke, J. A. 1972. Isthmanian Ethnobotanical Dictionary. Fulton, Maryland: Author.
- Duke, J. A. 1972. Lewd Latin Lexicon. Fulton, Maryland: Author. (A dictionary of colloquial slang in various Central American languages and dialects)
- Duke, J. A. 1981. Handbook of Legumes of World Economic Importance. New York: Plenum Press.
- Duke, J. A. 1981. Medicinal Plants of the Bible. Buffalo, New York: Trado-Medic Books.
- Duke, J. A. 1983. Handbook of Energy Crops, unpublished
- Duke, J. A. and E. S. Ayensu 1984.Medicinal Plants of China. Algonac, Michigan, Reference Publications, Inc. ISBN 0-917256-20-4
- Duke, J. A. 1985.Culinary Herbs: A Potpourri. New York: Conch Magazine, Ltd., Publishers.
- Duke, J. A. 1985. CRC Handbook of Medicinal Herbs. Boca Raton, Florida, CRC Press, Inc.
- Duke, J. A. 1985. Herbalbum: An Anthology of Varicose Verse. Fulton, Maryland: Author.
- Duke, J. A. 1986. Handbook of Northeastern Indian Medicinal Plants. Lincoln, Massachusetts, Quarterman Publications, Inc.
- Duke, J. A. and A. A. Atchley 1986. CRC Handbook of Proximate Analysis Tables of Higher Plants. Boca Raton, Florida, CRC Press, Inc.
- Duke, J.A. 1986. Isthmanian Ethnobotanical Dictionary, 3rd ed. Jodhpur, India: Scientific Publishers.
- Duke, J. A. 1987. Living Liqueurs. Lincoln, Massachusetts, Quarterman Publications, Inc.
- Duke, J. A., A. Atchley, K. Ackerson & P. Duke. 1987. CRC Handbook of Agricultural Energy Potential for Developing Countries. 4 vols. Boca Raton, Florida: CRC Press, Inc, ISBN 0-8493-3670-8
- Duke, J. A. 1989. Ginseng: A Concise Handbook. Algonac, Michigan, Reference Publications, Inc.
- Duke, J. A. 1989. CRC Handbook of Nuts. Boca Raton, Florida: CRC Press, Inc.
- Foster, S. & J. A. Duke 1990. A Field Guide to Medicinal Plants. Boston: Houghton Mifflin Company.
- Duke, J. A. 1992. Handbook of Edible Weeds. Boca Raton, Florida: CRC Press, Inc.
- Duke, J. A. 1992. Handbook of Phytochemical Constituents of GRAS Herbs and Other Economic Plants (and Database) Boca Raton, Florida: CRC Press, Inc
- Duke, J. A. 1992. Handbook of Biologically Active Phytochemicals and Their Activities (and Database). Boca Raton, Florida: CRC Press, Inc, ISBN 0-8493-3670-8
- Duke, J. A. & J. L. duCellier 1993. CRC Handbook of Alternative Cash Crops. Boca Raton, Florida: CRC Press, Inc.
- Duke, J. A. & R. Vasquez 1994. Amazonian Ethnobotanical Dictionary. Boca Raton, Florida: CRC Press, Inc.
- Beckstrom-Sternberg, S.M. & Duke, J. A. 1996. CRC Handbook of Medicinal Mints (Aromathematic): Phytochemical and Biological Activities. Boca Raton, Florida: CRC Press, Inc.
- Duke, J. A. 1997. The Green Pharmacy: New Discoveries in Herbal Remedies for Common Diseases and Conditions from the World's Foremost Authority on Healing Herbs.. Emmaus, Pennsylvania: Rodale Press, ISBN 0-87596-316-1
- Castner, J. L., S. L. Timme, & J. A. Duke. 1998. A Field Guide to Medicinal and Useful Plants of the Upper Amazon. Gainesville, Florida: Feline Press.
- Duke, J. A. 1999. Herbs of the Bible; 2000 Years of Plant Medicine. Loveland, Colorado: Interweave Press.
- Duke, J. A. 1999. Dr. Duke’s Essential Herbs: 13 Vital Herbs you Need to Disease-Proof Your Body, Boost Your Energy, Lengthen Your Life. Emmaus, Pennsylvania: Rodale Press.
- Foster, S. & Duke, J. A. 2000. A Field Guide to Medicinal Plants and Herbs. 2nd Ed. Boston: Houghton Mifflin Company.
- Duke, J. A. 2000. The Green Pharmacy Herbal Handbook: Your Comprehensive Reference to the Best Herbs for Healing. Emmaus, Pennsylvania: Rodale Press
- Duke, J. A. 2001. The Green Pharmacy Anti-aging Prescriptions - Herbs, Foods, and Natural Formulas to Keep you Young. Emmaus, Pennsylvania: Rodale Press, ISBN 1-57954-198-4
- Duke, J. A. 2002. Handbook of Medicinal Herbs, 2nd Ed. (2002). CRC Press, ISBN 0-8493-1284-1
- Duke, J. A. 2008. Duke's Handbook of Medicinal Plants of Latin America. CRC Press.
- Duke, J. A. 2009. The Green Pharmacy Guide to Healing Foods. Emmaus, Pennsylvania: Rodale Press.
