= Corticium furcatum =

Scientific classification
- Kingdom: Animalia
- Phylum: Porifera
- Class: Homoscleromorpha
- Order: Homosclerophorida
- Family: Plakinidae
- Genus: Corticium
- Species: C. furcatum

Binomial name
- Corticium furcatum Muricy, Sarmento, Lage, Almeida & Fromont, 2021

Species of sponge

Holotype site

Corticium furcatum is a species of sponge in the order Homosclerophorida. It was first described in 2021, from a fragmented specimen collected at a depth of 5-7 m on the Booker Rocks in Jurien Bay.

It is distinguished by its "large calthrops and exclusive candelabra with bifurcated rays in the apical actine".
