= Plakortis communis =

Scientific classification
- Kingdom: Animalia
- Phylum: Porifera
- Class: Homoscleromorpha
- Order: Homosclerophorida
- Family: Plakinidae
- Genus: Plakortis
- Species: P. communis

Binomial name
- Plakortis communis Muricy, 2011

Species of sponge

Holotype site

Plakortis communis is a species of marine sponge in the order Homosclerophorida, first described in 2011 by Guilherme Muricy.

== Distribution ==
The holotype was collected off Cartier Island, Western Australia, and the species is found in the IMCRA regions of "Timor Province", "Southwest Shelf Transition", and "Northeast Shelf Province", that is, off the Queensland coast and the North & South-west coasts of Western Australia.
