= George R. Pettit =

American chemist (1929–2021)

George Robert Pettit II (June 8, 1929 – September 21, 2021) was a Regents’ Professor in Chemistry in the School of Molecular Sciences (SMS) at Arizona State University. He was an internationally renowned and respected researcher in the field of natural anticancer compounds throughout his career of over six decades. Pettit has been honored by the International Cancer Advocacy Network, the American Society of Pharmacognosy, and Washington State University, his alma mater. A special edition of the Journal of Natural Products is dedicated to Pettit, and the French journal Médicine Sciences paid tribute to him. Pettit’s achievements earned him the designation of Outstanding Investigator by the United States National Institutes of Health National Cancer Institute (NCI). Pettit and his impact on the field of anti-cancer compounds are the subject of the book, “Waging War on Cancer.”

== Early life and education ==
George Robert “Bob” Pettit was born on June 8, 1929, the eldest son of George Robert and Florence Elizabeth (Seymour) Pettit in Long Branch, New Jersey. Following his graduation from Long Branch High School, he attended Monmouth Junior College (since renamed as Monmouth University. Pettit earned a Bachelor of Science in Chemistry from Washington State University in 1952 under the guidance of Professor Gardner Stacy. Pettit then earned a Master of Science in Heterocyclic Chemistry in 1954, and his Ph.D. in Steroid Chemistry from Wayne State University under Carl Djerassi in 1956.

== Career ==
Pettit’s foray in natural products chemistry began in the summer of 1953, working for DuPont in Orange, Texas, just prior to beginning his graduate studies at Wayne State University. After graduating from Wayne State, Pettit was hired as a senior research chemist by Norwich Pharmaceutical Company, and moved to Norwich, New York. While there he worked on drug discovery related to the central nervous system yet remained passionate about anticancer research.

In 1957 Pettit left Norwich and began his teaching and anticancer research career at the University of Maine. Pettit received his first grant from the National Cancer Institute (NCI) in 1959. Later, he applied for and received a construction grant from the National Institutes of Health (NIH) to build a laboratory. Pettit continued his anticancer research at the University of Maine until 1965, having been promoted to full professor.

In 1965, Pettit was hired as a Professor of Chemistry by Arizona State University, where he continued his anticancer research while training hundreds of graduate students and postdoctoral fellows throughout his career.

In 1975, Pettit founded the Cancer Research Institute, serving as its director for 30 years. While at ASU, Pettit was appointed Dalton Professor of Cancer Research and Medicinal Chemistry, and later, Regents Professor of Chemistry.

Pettit’s overall strategy involved the harvesting of natural agents from marine organisms, microorganisms, insects, and plant specimens that were tested for anticancer components. Using this strategy, Pettit and his research group discovered multiple anti-cancer compounds, including bryostatins, dolastatins/auristatins, and combretastatins, several of which advanced into preclinical and clinical trials for a wide range of cancers, and others have been approved by the FDA for the treatment of a range of lymphomas.

In 2020 Pettit retired after 55 years of service to ASU. During his tenure at ASU, Pettit published over 800 peer-reviewed research articles, 14 books, 17 book chapters, and received 70 U.S. patents. His papers have been cited over 30,000 times. Pettit’s h-index, a measure of his publications’ impact, is 89.

Pettit was a member of the American Society of Pharmacognosy, and also served as the senior editor of the Journal of Natural Products.

== Recognition ==
- WSU Regents Distinguished Alumnus Award
- State of Arizona Governor’s Excellence Award
- Ernest Guenther Award in the Chemistry of Natural Products
- Chemical Pioneer Award from the American Institute of Chemists
- National Cancer Institute Outstanding Investigator Award
- Research Achievement Award and a Fellowship in the American Society of Pharmacognosy

The late Professor Carl Djerassi described Pettit as “one of the great heroes in the chemistry of marine natural products out of which he created a battery of anti-cancer agents not equaled anywhere.”

Dr. Gordon Cragg, former chief of the National Cancer Institute’s Natural Products Branch, stated Pettit “was among the first to explore the realm of marine organisms as a source of potential antitumor agents. His early research in this area blossomed into a marine natural products drug discovery program of exceptional productivity and achievement.”
