= Plakortis bergquistae =

Scientific classification
- Kingdom: Animalia
- Phylum: Porifera
- Class: Homoscleromorpha
- Order: Homosclerophorida
- Family: Plakinidae
- Genus: Plakortis
- Species: P. bergquistae

Binomial name
- Plakortis bergquistae Muricy, 2011

Species of sponge

Holotype site

Plakortis bergquistae is a species of marine sponge in the order Homosclerophorida, first described in 2011 by Guilherme Muricy. The species epithet, bergquistae, honours Patricia Bergquist.

== Distribution ==
The holotype was collected near Bitung, North Sulawesi, Sulawesi Sea. In Australia it is found in the IMCRA region "Northwest Shelf Transition".
