= Plakortis insularis =

Scientific classification
- Kingdom: Animalia
- Phylum: Porifera
- Class: Homoscleromorpha
- Order: Homosclerophorida
- Family: Plakinidae
- Genus: Plakortis
- Species: P. insularis

Binomial name
- Plakortis insularis Moraes & Muricy, 2003

Species of sponge

Plakortis insularis is a species of marine sponge in the order Homosclerophorida, first described in 2003 by Moraes and Guilherme Muricy, from specimens collected from oceanic islands off north-eastern Brazil.
