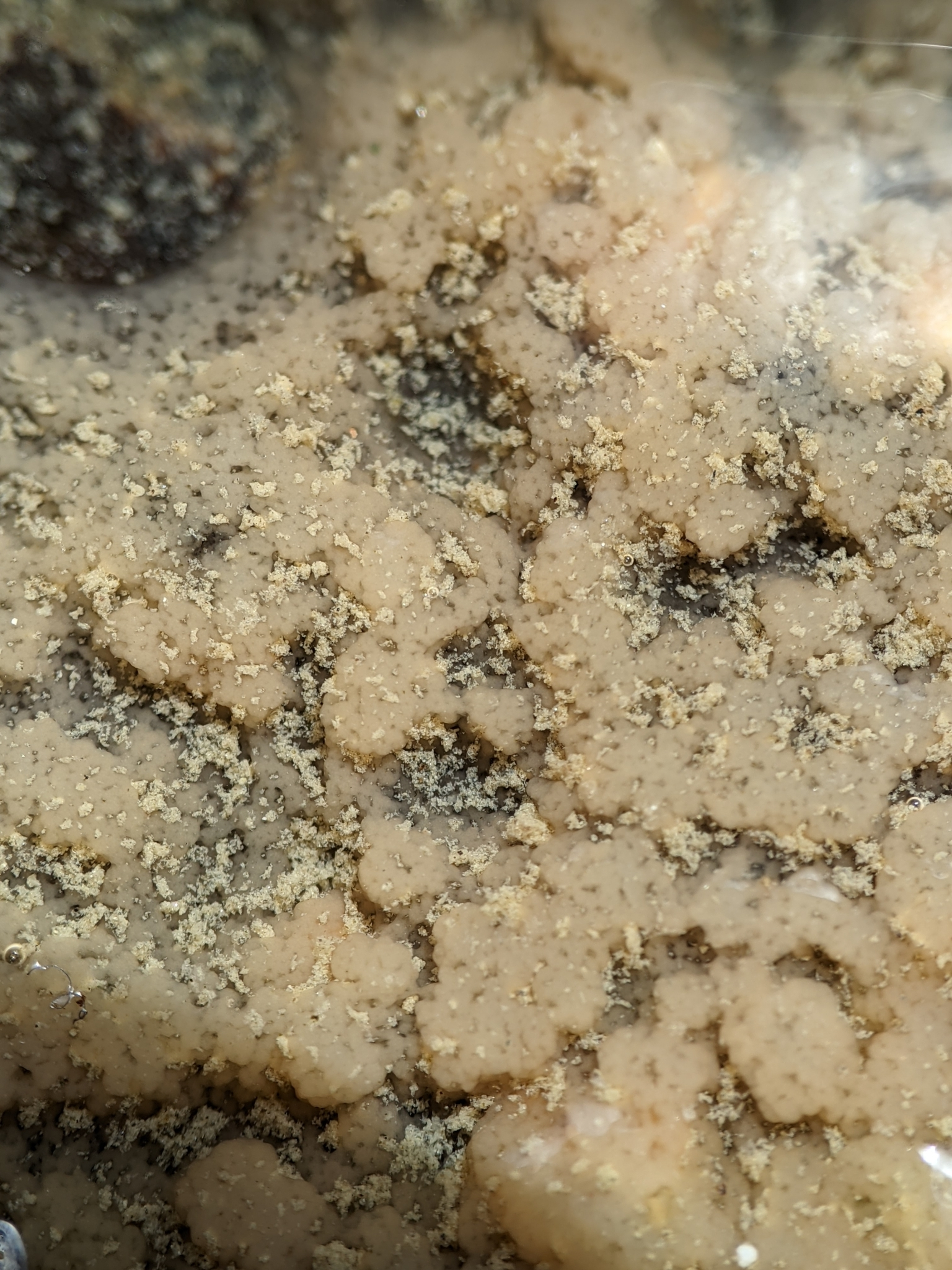

Scientific classification
- Kingdom: Animalia
- Phylum: Porifera
- Class: Homoscleromorpha
- Order: Homosclerophorida
- Family: Oscarellidae
- Genus: Oscarella
- Species: O. carmela

Binomial name
- Oscarella carmela Muricy & Pearse, 2004

= Oscarella carmela =

Species of sponges

Oscarella carmela, commonly known as the slime sponge, is a species of sponge in the order Homosclerophorida that was first described in 2004 by G. Muricy and J.S. Pearse. It is believed to be native to intertidal waters in the north east temperate Pacific Ocean and was first found in seawater aquaria in that region. It is used as a model organism in evolutionary biology.

== Description ==
Oscarella carmela is either encrusting or massive and forms a slimy covering or a thicker layer of spongy matter with an uneven, lumpy, lobed surface. It grows in patches on hard substrates up to 20 to 30 cm (8 to 12 in) in diameter and overgrows other organisms. The colour is variable and ranges from orange-brown to tan or beige. This sponge does not contain spicules or spongin to reinforce its body wall and has a simple structure with only two types of cell with inclusions.

== Distribution and habitat ==
Oscarella carmela is believed to be a native of northern and central Californian marine waters. It was first observed in Monterey Bay Aquarium and several research seawater aquaria in western California. It was later searched for, and eventually found, in the sea on the underside of boulders in rock pools in the high intertidal zone in Carmel Bay. Although it was not described until 2004, it is not believed to be an invasive species in the United States but is more likely to be indigenous and have been overlooked previously because it is uncommon and very similar to more common Halisarca species. It is in fact the only member of its genus Oscarella to be found in the eastern Pacific. It is hypothesized that in the wild it may be limited in its distribution by predation, whereas in the protected environment of an aquarium it grows profusely.

== Biology ==
Like other sponges, Oscarella carmela is a filter feeder. It creates a current of water through its interior from which it extracts bacteria and planktonic food particles. Reproduction is viviparous and the planktonic larvae are the oval type known as amphiblastulae. This type of larval form is quite common in calcareous sponges but is unusual in other sponge groups.

The genome of Oscarella carmela has been sequenced and it is used as a model in evolutionary developmental biology. Analysis of the genome suggests that the last common ancestor of sponges and eumetazoan animals (a clade that contains all the higher animals except the sponges and placozoans) was more complex both genetically and morphologically than had previously been thought. The data suggest that homoscleromorph sponges have retained certain features that have been lost in other demosponges.
