= Corticium =

Corticium may refer to two different genera:

- Corticium (fungus), a genus of fungi
- Corticium (sponge), a genus of sea sponges in the family Plakinidae
