= Plakortis hooperi =

Scientific classification
- Kingdom: Animalia
- Phylum: Porifera
- Class: Homoscleromorpha
- Order: Homosclerophorida
- Family: Plakinidae
- Genus: Plakortis
- Species: P. hooperi

Binomial name
- Plakortis hooperi Muricy, 2011

Species of sponge

Holotype site

Plakortis hooperi is a species of marine sponge in the order Homosclerophorida, first described in 2011 by Guilherme Muricy. The species epithet, hooperi, honours John Hooper (marine biologist), an Australian sponge specialist.

== Distribution ==
The holotype was collected off Motupore Island, Round Hill Barrier Reef, Papua New Guinea and the species is known from Papua New Guinea and the northern coasts of Queensland.
