= Plakortis fromontae =

Scientific classification
- Kingdom: Animalia
- Phylum: Porifera
- Class: Homoscleromorpha
- Order: Homosclerophorida
- Family: Plakinidae
- Genus: Plakortis
- Species: P. fromontae

Binomial name
- Plakortis fromontae Muricy, 2011

Species of sponge

Holotype site

Plakortis fromontae is a species of marine sponge in the order Homosclerophorida, first described in 2011 by Guilherme Muricy. The species epithet, fromontae, honours Jane Fromont.

== Distribution ==
The holotype was collected off Rat Island, Western Australia, in the Houtman Abrolhos and the species is known only from that locality.
