= Corticium diamantense =

Scientific classification
- Kingdom: Animalia
- Phylum: Porifera
- Class: Homoscleromorpha
- Order: Homosclerophorida
- Family: Plakinidae
- Genus: Corticium
- Species: C. diamantense

Binomial name
- Corticium diamantense Ereskovsky, Lavrov & Willenz, 2014

Species of sponge

Corticium diamantense is a species of sea sponge in the order Homosclerophorida, first found in vertical walls of reef caves at depths of about 23 to 28 metres (75 to 92 ft) in the Caribbean Sea. This species has oscula situated near its border; regular non-lophose calthrops of one size, rare tetralophose calthrops and candelabra, the fourth actine of which is basally ramified into 4 or 5 microspined rays.
