= Oscarella tuberculata =

Scientific classification
- Domain: Eukaryota
- Kingdom: Animalia
- Phylum: Porifera
- Class: Homoscleromorpha
- Order: Homosclerophorida
- Family: Oscarellidae
- Genus: Oscarella
- Species: O. tuberculata

Binomial name
- Oscarella tuberculata (Schmidt, 1868)

Synonyms
- Chondrosia tuberculata Schmidt, 1868

Species of sponge

Oscarella tuberculata is a species of sponge in the order Homosclerophorida. It is endemic to the Mediterranean Sea, where it forms encrusting colonies on rocks and other hard surfaces.

== Description ==
Oscarella tuberculata is a thickly encrusting sponge forming small patches up to 20 cm (8 in) in diameter. The tissue contains no spongin or spicules but is firm to the touch, with a cartilage-like consistency. The surface is granular or wrinkled, with Irregular lobes and bulges, and small tubular structures emerging, some bearing osculae. This sponge is fairly uniform in colour, usually being yellowish-green, sometimes with a bluish tinge; occasionally, different parts of the colony differ in colour.

== Distribution ==
Oscarella tuberculata occurs in the Mediterranean Sea at depths of between about 5 and 25 m (16 and 82 ft), on rocky substrates. It often grows in caves and under overhangs.

== Biology ==
Oscarella tuberculata is a filter feeder. Water is drawn into the interior of the sponge through minute pores called ostia, the organic particles and bacteria on which the sponge feeds are filtered out, and the water is pumped out through the osculae.

Historically it has been thought that sponges in class Homoscleromorpha did not reproduce asexually, but it has now been discovered that both Oscarella tuberculata and Oscarella lobularis can reproduce by budding. First an irregular protuberance forms near the base of the sponge, then it elongates to form a hollow nipple-like shape, in which the cavity is derived from the parent's exhalant channel. Finally, the swollen bubble-like structure breaks away from the parent sponge. The "bubble" is buoyant in the water column for a few days before settling on the seabed and attaching to the substrate, assisted by small conical outgrowths. It develops into a juvenile sponge with an oscula in four to ten days. This budding process in Homoscleromorpha is unique among sponges, as the tissue involved is all derived from epithelial cells and does not involve the migration of mesohyl cells (the gelatinous matrix in the interior of the sponge) into the bud as it forms.

== Ecology ==
This is a vigorous species of sponge; it overgrows the surface of larger sponges, sea fans and bryozoans. Sea slugs such as Berthella plumula feed on this sponge.
