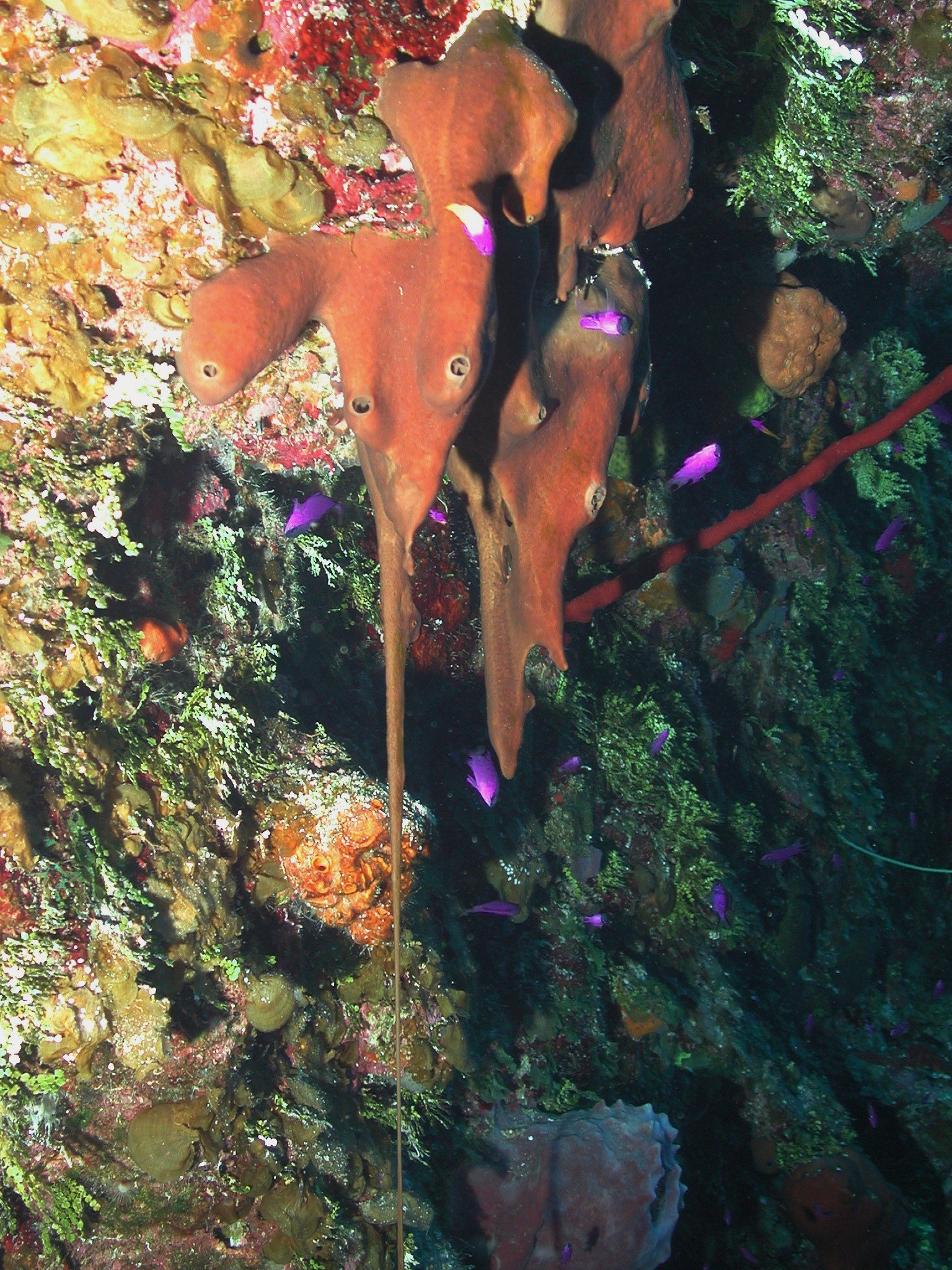
- An unidentified Plakortis species

Scientific classification
- Kingdom: Animalia
- Phylum: Porifera
- Class: Homoscleromorpha
- Order: Homosclerophorida
- Family: Plakinidae
- Genus: Plakortis; Schulze, 1880

Type species
- Plakortis simplex Schulze, 1880

Synonyms
- Placortis (misspelling); Roosa de Laubenfels, 1934

= Plakortis =

Genus of sponges

Plakortis is a genus of marine sponges in the order Homosclerophorida, first described by Franz Eilhard Schulze in 1880.

== Description ==
Plakortis sponges are characterised by having:

1. inorganic (spicular) skeletal complement
2. Skeleton composed mainly of diods, triods, and/or calthrops in one size class
3. Lophose diods, triods, or calthrops complement the main skeleton of non-lophose spicules
4. no lophose spicules
5. diactinal "microscleres" (microrhabs) in some species

== Species ==
List of accepted species:

- Plakortis albicans Cruz-Barraza & Carballo, 2005
- Plakortis angulospiculatus (Carter, 1879)
- Plakortis badabaluensis Ubare & Mohan, 2016
- Plakortis bergquistae Muricy, 2011
- Plakortis clarionensis Cruz-Barraza, Vega & Carballo, 2014
- Plakortis communis Muricy, 2011
- Plakortis copiosa Pulitzer-Finali, 1993
- Plakortis dariae Ereskovsky, Lavrov & Willenz, 2014
- Plakortis deweerdtaephila Vicente, Zea & Hill, 2016
- Plakortis edwardsi Ereskovsky, Lavrov & Willenz, 2014
- Plakortis erythraena Lévi, 1958
- Plakortis fromontae Muricy, 2011
- Plakortis galapagensis Desqueyroux-Faúndez & van Soest, 1997
- Plakortis halichondrioides (Wilson, 1902)
- Plakortis hooperi Muricy, 2011
- Plakortis insularis Moraes & Muricy, 2003
- Plakortis japonica (Hoshino, 1977)
- Plakortis kenyensis Pulitzer-Finali, 1993
- Plakortis lita de Laubenfels, 1954
- Plakortis mesophotica Idan, Shefer, Feldstein & Ilan, 2021
- Plakortis microrhabdifera Moraes & Muricy, 2003
- Plakortis myrae Ereskovsky, Lavrov & Willenz, 2014
- Plakortis nigra Lévi, 1953
- Plakortis petrupaulensis Domingos, Moraes & Muricy, 2013
- Plakortis potiguarensis Domingos, Moraes & Muricy, 2013
- Plakortis pulvillus Samaai, Pillay & Janson, 2019
- Plakortis quasiamphiaster Díaz & van Soest, 1994
- Plakortis ruetzleri Lage, Muricy, Ruiz & Pérez, 2018
- Plakortis simplex Schulze, 1880
- Plakortis spinalis Domingos, Moraes & Muricy, 2013
- Plakortis symbiotica Vicente, Zea & Hill, 2016
- Plakortis zyggompha (de Laubenfels, 1934)

== Literature ==
=== Chemical and medecinal properties ===
- Paul Ralifo; Sanchez, Laura; Nadine C Gassner; Karen Tenney; R Scott Lokey; Theodore R Holman; Frederick A Valeriote; Crews, Phillip (2007). "Pyrroloacridine alkaloids from Plakortis quasiamphiaster: structures and bioactivity". Journal of Natural Products. 70 (1): 95–99. doi:10.1021/np060585w. PMC 1839848. PMID 17253856. Wikidata Q42875300.
- Sridevi Ankisetty; Deborah J. Gochfeld; M. Cristina Diaz; Shabana I. Khan; Marc Slattery (2010). "Chemical constituents of the deep reef caribbean sponges Plakortis angulospiculatus and Plakortis halichondrioides and their anti-inflammatory activities". Journal of Natural Products. 73 (9): 1494–1498. doi:10.1021/np100233d. PMID 20738102. Wikidata Q84803121.
- Florecita S. De Guzman; Francis J. Schmitz (1990). "Peroxy Aliphatic Esters from the Sponge Plakortis lita". Journal of Natural Products. 53 (4): 926–931. doi:10.1021/np50070a021. Wikidata Q104397018.
- J. C. Braekman; D. Daloze; S. De Groote; J. B. Fernandes; R. W. Van Soest (1998). "New polyketides from the sponge Plakortis sp". Journal of Natural Products. 61 (8): 1038–1042. doi:10.1021/np980096z. PMID 9722495. Wikidata Q77171802.
- A Rudi; Y Kashman (1993). "Three new cytotoxic metabolites from the marine sponge Plakortis halichondrioides". Journal of Natural Products. 56 (10): 1827–1830. doi:10.1021/np50100a027. PMID 8277322. Wikidata Q72696133.
