= Plakortis edwardsi =

Scientific classification
- Kingdom: Animalia
- Phylum: Porifera
- Class: Homoscleromorpha
- Order: Homosclerophorida
- Family: Plakinidae
- Genus: Plakortis
- Species: P. edwardsi

Binomial name
- Plakortis edwardsi Ereskovsky, Lavrov & Willenz, 2014

Species of sponge

Plakortis edwardsi is a species of sea sponge in the order Homosclerophorida, first found in vertical walls of reef caves at depths of about 23 to 28 metres (75 to 92 ft) in the Caribbean Sea. This species has diods of a single category, with thick and S-shaped centres (measuring 110 to 128μm long); triods which are T-shaped (actines measuring 28–59μm long). It is the only species of this genus exhibiting small diods (measuring 22–31μm long).
