= P. nathaliae =

P. nathaliae can refer to:

- Plakina nathaliae, a species of sea sponge
- Psychotria nathaliae, a species of flowering plant
