= Plakortis myrae =

Scientific classification
- Kingdom: Animalia
- Phylum: Porifera
- Class: Homoscleromorpha
- Order: Homosclerophorida
- Family: Plakinidae
- Genus: Plakortis
- Species: P. myrae

Binomial name
- Plakortis myrae Ereskovsky, Lavrov & Willenz, 2014

Species of sponge

Plakortis myrae is a species of sea sponge in the order Homosclerophorida, first found in vertical walls of reef caves at depths of about 23 to 28 metres (75 to 92 ft) in the Caribbean Sea. This species has diods of two categories: large ones which are abundant (measuring 83–119μm long), and rare small ones (measuring 67–71μm long) with S-shaped centres; triods which are Y- or T-shaped (measuring 18–5μm long), and possesses abundant microrhabds (measuring 5–12μm long).
