= Plakortis dariae =

Scientific classification
- Kingdom: Animalia
- Phylum: Porifera
- Class: Homoscleromorpha
- Order: Homosclerophorida
- Family: Plakinidae
- Genus: Plakortis
- Species: P. dariae

Binomial name
- Plakortis dariae Ereskovsky, Lavrov & Willenz, 2014

Species of sponge

Plakortis dariae is a species of sea sponge in the order Homosclerophorida, first found in vertical walls of reef caves at depths of about 23 to 28 metres (75 to 92 ft) in the Caribbean Sea. This species has diods of two different categories: it possesses large ones (measuring 67–112μm long) and small, rare, irregular, curved ones, which are often deformed with one of its ends being blunt (measuring 30–59μm long); triods are rare and regular (actines measuring 20–44μm long).
