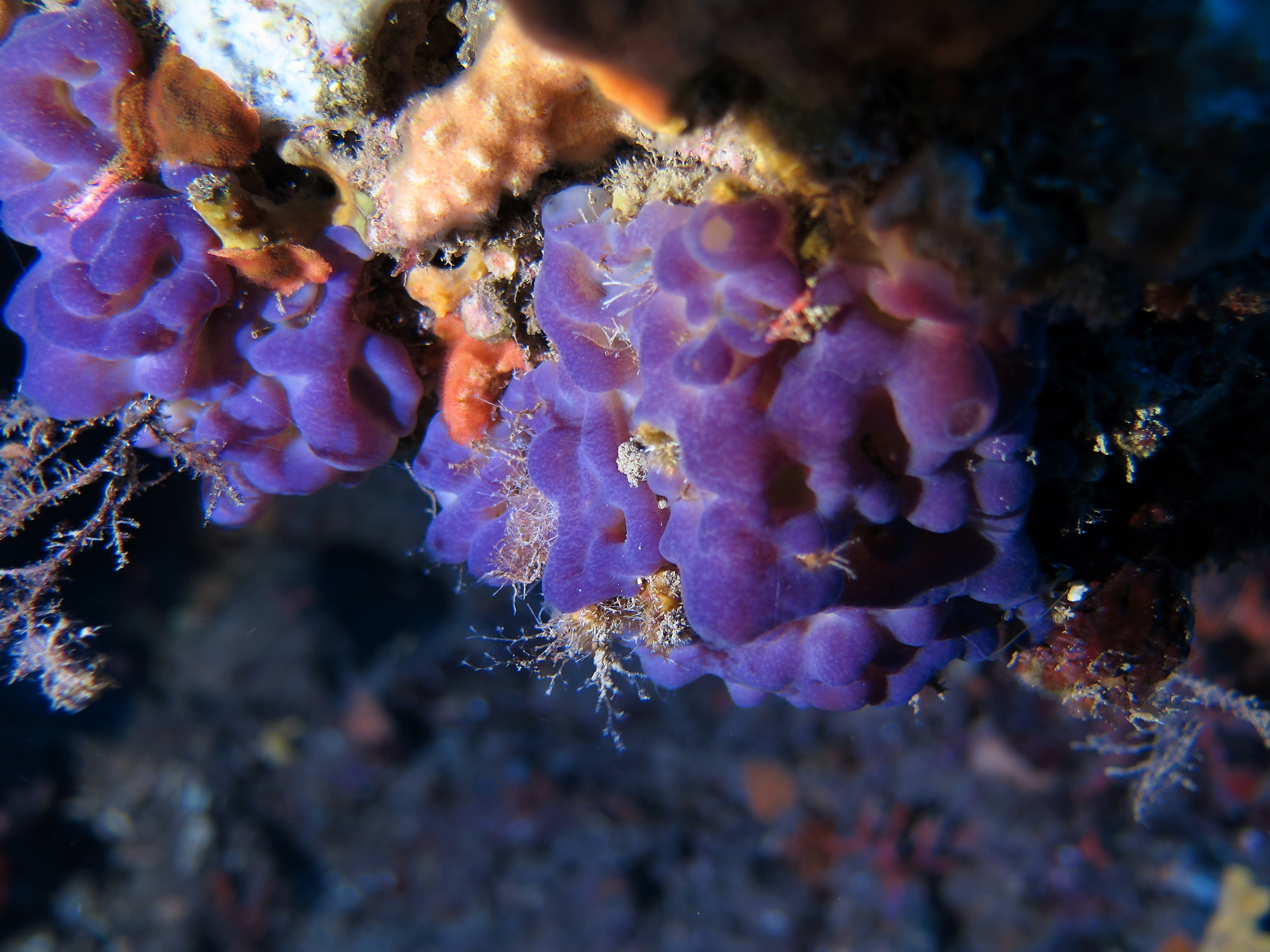
- Oscarella lobularis

Scientific classification
- Kingdom: Animalia
- Phylum: Porifera
- Class: Homoscleromorpha
- Order: Homosclerophorida
- Family: Oscarellidae
- Genus: Oscarella; Vosmaer, 1884

Type species
- Halisarca lobularis Schmidt, 1862

Species
- see text

Synonyms
- Octavella Tuzet & Paris, 1963 – unaccepted junior synonym; Oscaria Vosmaer, 1881 – unaccepted (preoccupied)

= Oscarella =

Genus of sponges

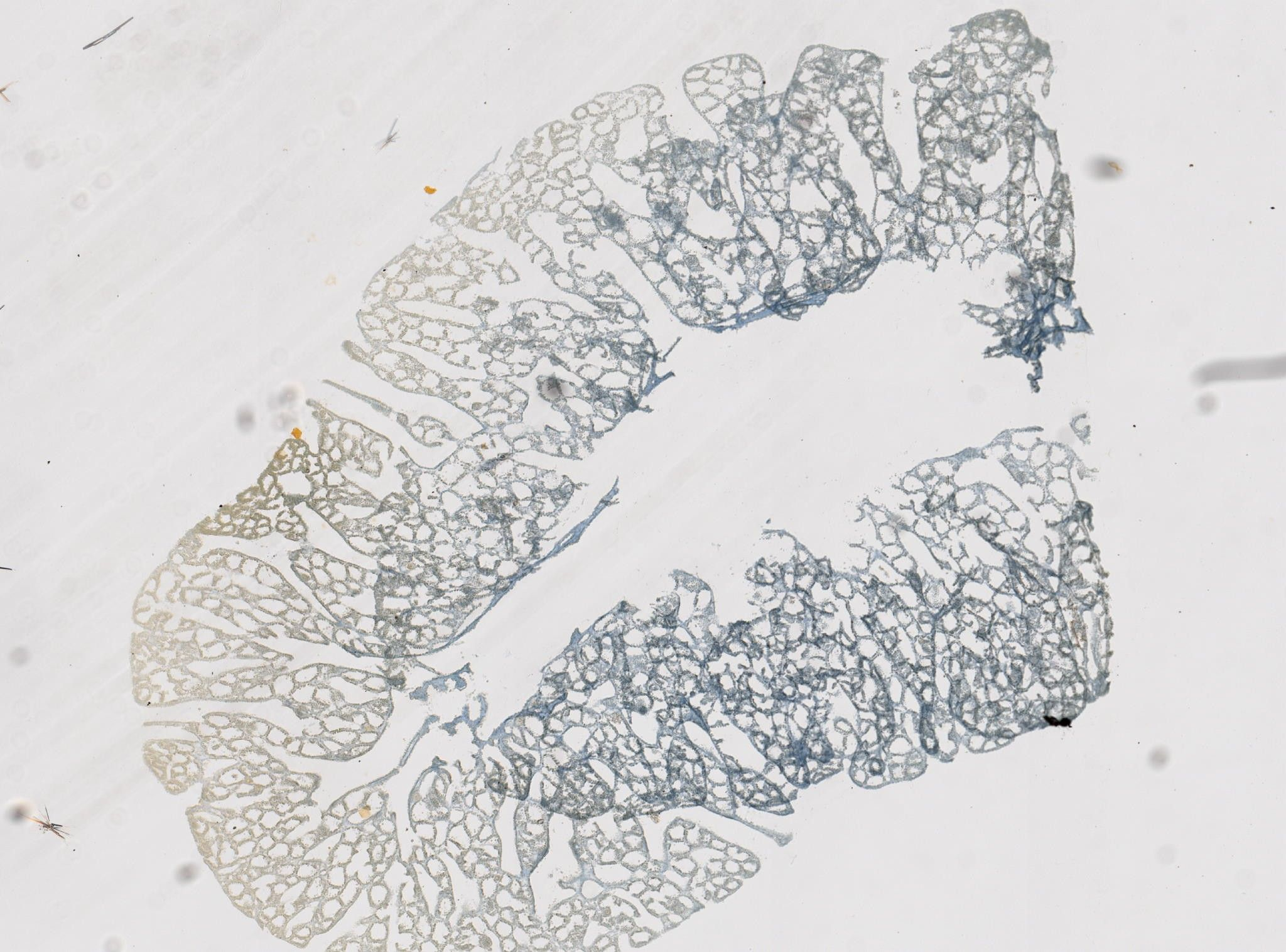
A slide section of Oscarella

Oscarella is a genus of marine sponges. The genus can be found off the coast of every continent, in every ocean except the Arctic.

== Species ==
Subtaxa include:

- Oscarella aurantia Stillitani, Ereskovsky, Pérez, Ruiz, Laport, Puccinelli, Hardoim, Willenz, & Muricy, 2022
- Oscarella balibaloi Pérez, Ivanisevic, Dubois, Pedel, Thomas, Tokina, & Ereskovsky, 2011
- Oscarella bergenensis Gazave, Lavrov, Cabrol, Renard, Rocher, Vacelet, Adamska, Borchiellini, & Ereskovsky, 2013
- Oscarella carmela Muricy & Pearse, 2004
- Oscarella carollineae Stillitani, Ereskovsky, Pérez, Ruiz, Laport, Puccinelli, Hardoim, Willenz, & Muricy, 2022
- Oscarella cruenta (Carter, 1876)
- Oscarella filipoi Pérez & Ruiz, 2018
- Oscarella imperialis Muricy, Boury-Esnault, Bézac, & Vacelet, 1996
- Oscarella kamchatkensis Ereskovsky, Sanamyan, & Vishnyakov, 2009
- Oscarella lobularis (Schmidt, 1862)
- Oscarella malakhovi Ereskovsky, 2006
- Oscarella membranacea Hentschel, 1909
- Oscarella microlobata Muricy, Boury-Esnault, Bézac, & Vacelet, 1996
- Oscarella minka Ruiz, Ereskovsky, & Pérez, 2022
- Oscarella nicolae Gazave, Lavrov, Cabrol, Renard, Rocher, Vacelet, Adamska, Borchiellini, & Ereskovsky, 2013
- Oscarella nigraviolacea Bergquist & Kelly, 2004
- Oscarella ochreacea Muricy & Pearse, 2004
- Oscarella pearsei Ereskovsky, Richter, Lavrov, Schippers, & Nichols, 2017
- Oscarella ruthae Stillitani, Ereskovsky, Pérez, Ruiz, Laport, Puccinelli, Hardoim, Willenz, & Muricy, 2022
- Oscarella stillans Bergquist & Kelly, 2004
- Oscarella tenuis Hentschel, 1909
- Oscarella tuberculata (Schmidt, 1868)
- Oscarella viridis Muricy, Boury-Esnault, Bézac, & Vacelet, 1996
- Oscarella zoranja Pérez & Ruiz, 2018

Former members include:

- Oscarella nathaliae Ereskovsky, Lavrov & Willenz, 2014, now accepted as Plakina nathaliae (Ereskovsky, Lavrov & Willenz, 2014)
- Oscarella rubra (Hanitsch, 1890), now accepted as Aplysilla rubra (Hanitsch, 1890)
- Oscarella lobularis var. coerulea (Schulze, 1877), now accepted as a junior synonym of Oscarella lobularis (Schmidt, 1862)
