= Berthella ocellata =

Scientific classification
- Kingdom: Animalia
- Phylum: Mollusca
- Class: Gastropoda
- Order: Pleurobranchida
- Family: Pleurobranchidae
- Genus: Berthella
- Species: B. ocellata

Binomial name
- Berthella ocellata (Delle Chiaje, 1830)

Synonyms
- Pleurobranchus (Bouvieria) ocellatus Delle Chiaje, 1830; Pleurobranchus monterosati Vayssière, 1880; Pleurobranchus ocellatus Delle Chiaje, 1830

Species of gastropod

Berthella ocellata is a species of sea slug, a marine gastropod mollusc in the family Pleurobranchidae. It is native to the eastern Atlantic Ocean and the Mediterranean Sea where it inhabits the shallow sublittoral zone.

== Description ==
The adult length of Berthella ocellata is about 7 cm (2.8 in). It has an oval shape when extended and moving around, and circular when stationary. The head bears a pair of small black eyes and the mouth is underneath, with the buccal veil protruding on either side. The rhinophores are just in front of the eyes, and are tubular, with a split on the under surface; they project from the front edge of the mantle. When moving, the foot trails behind the slug; the underside of the foot is whitish or pale brown. There are two distinct colour forms of this sea slug, either brown, or whitish; in both cases the body is covered with white or pink, translucent, slightly-domed tubercles, each surrounded by a white rim. The gill is yellow and bipinnate and is located between the mantle and the foot, on the right-hand side at the back. Under the mantle dorsally, there is a small, rudimentary, whitish internal shell.

== Distribution and habitat ==
This species occurs in the Mediterranean Sea, the eastern Atlantic Ocean, including the Canary Islands. It is found on rocks in the shallow sublittoral zone, mostly at depths less than 20 m (70 ft) but sometimes as deep as 120 m (400 ft).

== Ecology ==
Being nocturnal, B. ocellata spends the day under stones, in crevices or in caves; it feeds on sponges such as Plakina trilopha, Plakinastrella copiosa and Corticium candelabrum, using its muscular radula to rasp off fragments. Its foot produces acidic secretions which are distasteful to predators.

These slugs are hermaphrodites. The genital pores are on the right-hand side in front of the gill, and two individual slugs will position themselves in a head-to tail position, and each pass sperm to the other. Fertilisation is internal, and the eggs are probably laid in a gelatinous spiral, as is the case with other members of the genus.
