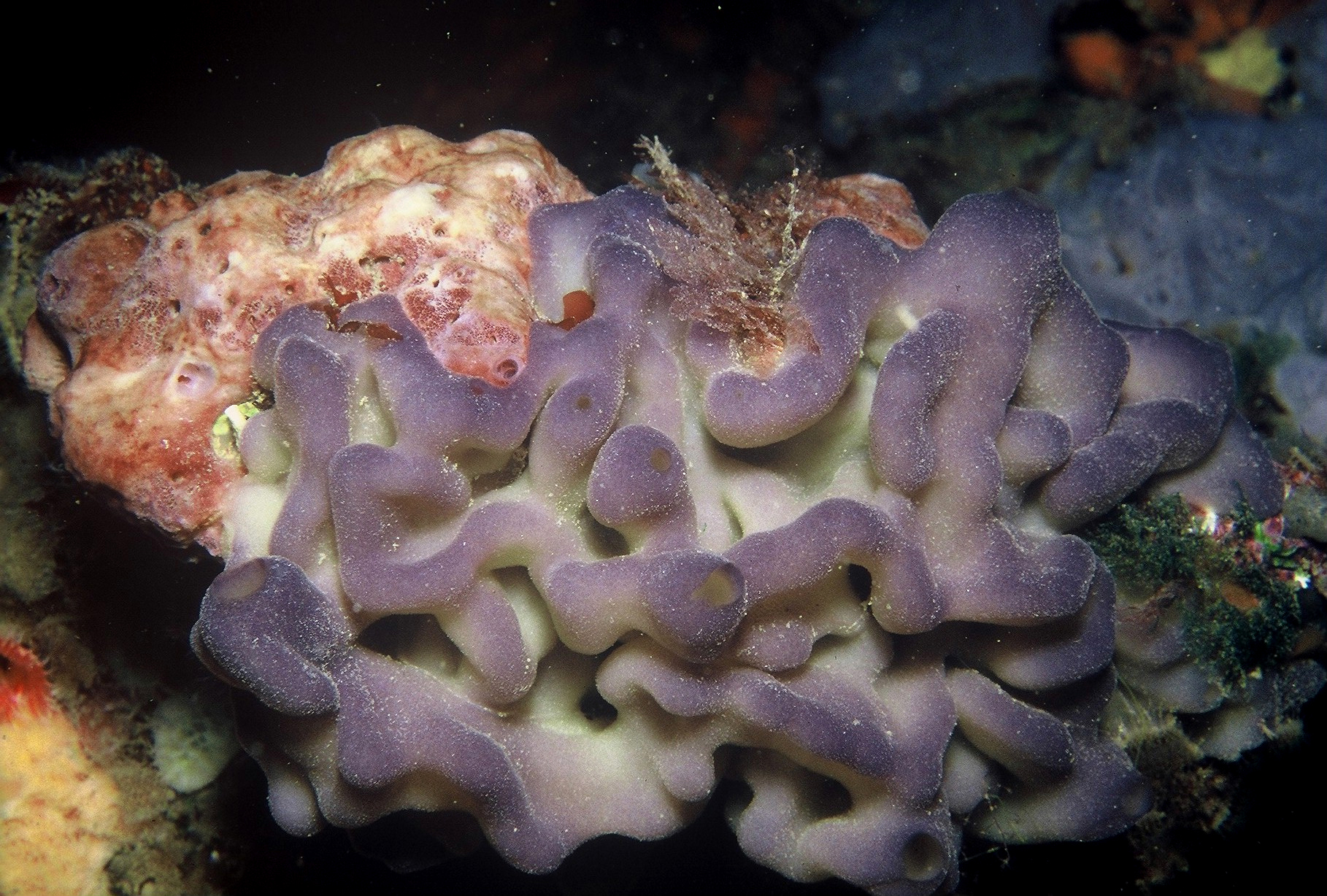

Scientific classification
- Kingdom: Animalia
- Phylum: Porifera
- Class: Homoscleromorpha
- Order: Homosclerophorida
- Family: Oscarellidae
- Genus: Oscarella
- Species: O. lobularis

Binomial name
- Oscarella lobularis (Schmidt, 1862)

Synonyms
- List: Halisarca lobularis Schmidt, 1862; Halisarca mimosa Giard, 1873; Octavella galangaui Tuzet & Paris, 1963; Oscaria lobularis (Schmidt, 1862)

= Oscarella lobularis =

Species of sponge

Oscarella lobularis is a species of sponge in the order Homosclerophorida. It is native to the northeastern Atlantic Ocean and the Mediterranean Sea, where it forms encrusting colonies on rocks and other hard surfaces.

== Description ==
Oscarella lobularis is an encrusting sponge that forms a thick layer of soft, gelatinous consistency with a velvety surface, on rocks, stones and large seaweeds. Colonies are up to 30 cm (12 in) wide and 3 cm (1.2 in) thick, with an irregularly lobed surface. The sides of the nodular lobes have a scattering of ostia through which water passes into the sponge, and at the top of each, a single round osculum up to 1 cm (0.4 in) in diameter, through which water exits. This sponge has neither spicules nor spongin fibres in its tissues. It is usually some shade of yellow or brown but can occasionally be red, violet, green or blue, often with a cream-coloured base layer.

== Ecology ==
Like other sponges, Oscarella lobularis is a filter feeder. Water is drawn into the interior of the sponge through the ostia, the bacteria and organic particles on which the sponge feeds are filtered out, and the surplus water is expelling through the osculi. This sponge is a hermaphrodite; ciliated larvae known as parenchymella larvae are liberated into the water and soon settle on the substrate and undergo metamorphosis into the adult form. It has the ability to regrow damaged body structures and recreate a functional body from cells that have been separated. This morphogenetic process involves epithelial cells fusing together to form a single layer of continuous epithelium.

This sponge can reproduce asexually. Colonies growing under overhangs can develop elongations that become shaped like tear-drops, dangle on threads of tissue and eventually detach, landing on the seabed below and growing into new colonies; the sponge has also been observed to develop bubble-like buds on its external surface which become detached and, being buoyant, are dispersed by currents in the water column and rapidly grow into new colonies.

== Research ==
Oscarella lobularis has been used as a model organism for the study of evolutionary biology and developmental biology, being particularly suitable because of its easy availability, its simple histology and cell composition, its robust epithelial structures and because it lacks a skeleton.

Researchers have studied the different colour morphs of this sponge which sometimes grow alongside each other. There appears to be a cryptic complex and two species that had been synonymised in 1877 have been redescribed as O. lobularis (violet in colour) and O. tuberculata; these species can be distinguished from each other cytologically, and by the former having a soft consistency and the latter a cartilaginous consistency. Several other new species have been described, mostly from caves.
