= Plakina trilopha =

Scientific classification
- Domain: Eukaryota
- Kingdom: Animalia
- Phylum: Porifera
- Class: Homoscleromorpha
- Order: Homosclerophorida
- Family: Plakinidae
- Genus: Plakina
- Species: P. trilopha

Binomial name
- Plakina trilopha Schulze, 1880

Species of sponge

Plakina trilopha is a species of sponge in the order Homosclerophorida. It is native to the Mediterranean Sea and the Canary Islands. It was first described in 1880 by the German zoologist Franz Eilhard Schulze.
