= Corticium candelabrum =

Scientific classification
- Kingdom: Animalia
- Phylum: Porifera
- Class: Homoscleromorpha
- Order: Homosclerophorida
- Family: Plakinidae
- Genus: Corticium
- Species: C. candelabrum

Binomial name
- Corticium candelabrum Schmidt, 1862

Species of sponge

Corticium candelabrum is a species of sponge in the order Homosclerophorida. It is native to the eastern Atlantic Ocean and the Mediterranean Sea where it inhabits the shallow sublittoral zone. The type locality is the Adriatic Sea.

== Description ==
Corticium candelabrum is sometimes thinly encrusting, or may form small solid cushions some 10 to 15 cm (4 to 6 in) across and 2 to 3 cm (0.8 to 1.2 in) high which are connected to the substrate by a narrow solid stalk. The surface is sometimes irregularly lobed and is smooth and shiny, and covered by a translucent envelope. The oscula (exhalant openings) are slightly raised and the pores (inhalant openings) are few in number but quite noticeable. The colour is some shade of pale to mid-brown, sometimes tinged with red, and its consistency varies from firm to cartilaginous.

== Distribution and habitat ==
The species occurs in shallow water in the eastern Atlantic Ocean, including the Canary Islands, the Azores and Madeira, and the Iberian Peninsula from Biarritz southwards to Gibraltar. It also occurs in the Western Mediterranean Sea and Adriatic Sea. It is found in coralline algae communities in shady positions, on vertical walls, under overhangs and in caves, at depths down to about 20 m (70 ft). It is one of the most widely distributed sponges in the Mediterranean.

== Ecology ==
Like other sponges, C. candelabrum draws water into its body through the small pores, filters out and ingests the nutritional particles, and expels the water through the oscula. It feeds on small particles under three micrometres in diameter, such as bacteria, unicellular algae and organic debris. The sea slug Berthella ocellata sometimes feeds on the sponge, rasping off fragments with its radula.

This sponge is a hermaphrodite, but the male and female gametes mature at different times, so it does not self-fertilise. The sperm are liberated into the sea and if they are drawn into another sponge of the same species, they are engulfed by cells containing the eggs and fertilisation occurs. The larvae are retained within the sponge until they reached their final stage of development after which they are expelled into the water column, soon after which they settle on the substrate and metamorphose into juvenile sponges.
