= Plakina nathaliae =

Scientific classification
- Kingdom: Animalia
- Phylum: Porifera
- Class: Homoscleromorpha
- Order: Homosclerophorida
- Family: Plakinidae
- Genus: Plakina
- Species: P. nathaliae

Binomial name
- Plakina nathaliae (Ereskovsky, Lavrov & Willenz, 2014)

Synonyms
- Oscarella nathaliae Ereskovsky, Lavrov & Willenz, 2014

Species of sponge

Plakina nathaliae is a species of sea sponge in the order Homosclerophorida, first found in vertical walls of reef caves at depths of about 23 to 28 metres (75 to 92 ft) in the Caribbean Sea. It has a leaf-like flat body, which is loosely attached to the substrate and a perforated, unlobate surface; it contains two bacterial morphotypes and is characterized by two mesohylar cell types with inclusions.

In March 2017, the species was reassigned to Plakina Schulze, 1880.
