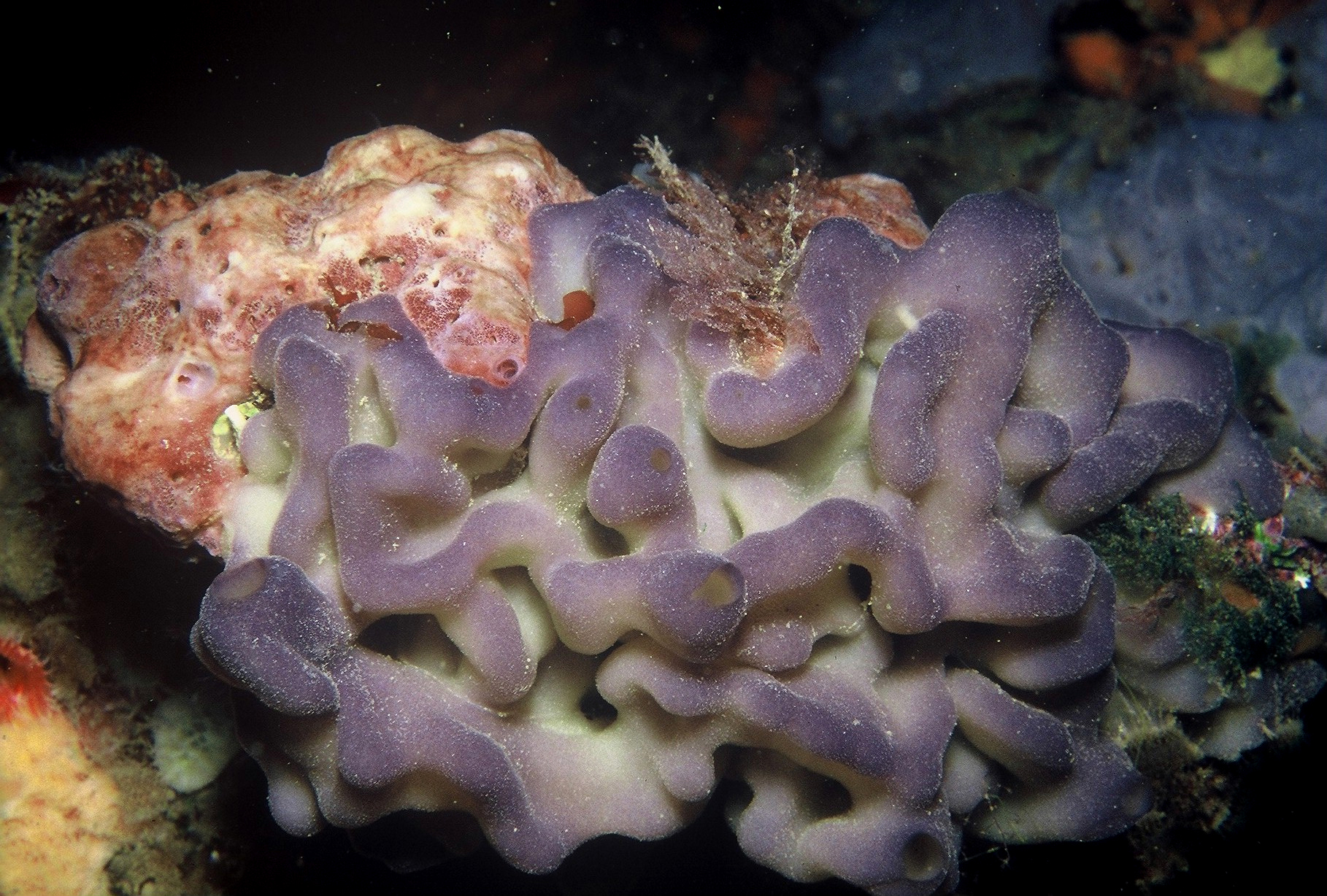
- Oscarella lobularis

Scientific classification
- Kingdom: Animalia
- Phylum: Porifera
- Class: Homoscleromorpha
- Order: Homosclerophorida
- Family: Oscarellidae; Lendenfeld, 1887

Genera
- see text

= Oscarellidae =

Family of sponges

Oscarellidae is a family of marine sponges.

== Genera ==
- Oscarella Vosmaer, 1884
  - Oscarella aurantia Stillitani, Ereskovsky, Pérez, Ruiz, Laport, Puccinelli, Hardoim, Willenz, & Muricy, 2022
  - Oscarella balibaloi Pérez, Ivanisevic, Dubois, Pedel, Thomas, Tokina & Ereskovsky, 2011
  - Oscarella bergenensis Gazave, Lavrov, Cabrol, Renard, Rocher, Vacelet, Adamska, Borchiellini & Ereskovsky, 2013
  - Oscarella carmela Muricy & Pearse, 2004
  - Oscarella carollineae Stillitani, Ereskovsky, Pérez, Ruiz, Laport, Puccinelli, Hardoim, Willenz, & Muricy, 2022
  - Oscarella cruenta (Carter, 1876)
  - Oscarella filipoi Pérez & Ruiz, 2018
  - Oscarella imperialis Muricy, Boury-Esnault, Bézac & Vacelet, 1996
  - Oscarella kamchatkensis Ereskovsky, Sanamyan & Vishnyakov, 2009
  - Oscarella lobularis (Schmidt, 1862)
  - Oscarella malakhovi Ereskovsky, 2006
  - Oscarella membranacea Hentschel, 1909
  - Oscarella microlobata Muricy, Boury-Esnault, Bézac & Vacelet, 1996
  - Oscarella minka Ruiz, Ereskovsky, & Pérez, 2022
  - Oscarella nicolae Gazave, Lavrov, Cabrol, Renard, Rocher, Vacelet, Adamska, Borchiellini & Ereskovsky, 2013
  - Oscarella nigraviolacea Bergquist & Kelly, 2004
  - Oscarella ochreacea Muricy & Pearse, 2004
  - Oscarella pearsei Ereskovsky, Richter, Lavrov, Schippers & Nichols, 2017
  - Oscarella ruthae Stillitani, Ereskovsky, Pérez, Ruiz, Laport, Puccinelli, Hardoim, Willenz, & Muricy, 2022
  - Oscarella stillans Bergquist & Kelly, 2004
  - Oscarella tenuis Hentschel, 1909
  - Oscarella tuberculata (Schmidt, 1868)
  - Oscarella viridis Muricy, Boury-Esnault, Bézac & Vacelet, 1996
  - Oscarella zoranja Pérez & Ruiz, 2018
- Pseudocorticium Boury-Esnault, Muricy, Gallissian & Vacelet, 1995
  - Pseudocorticium jarrei Boury-Esnault, Muricy, Gallissian & Vacelet, 1995
