= Pharmacognosy =

Study of drugs obtained from natural sources

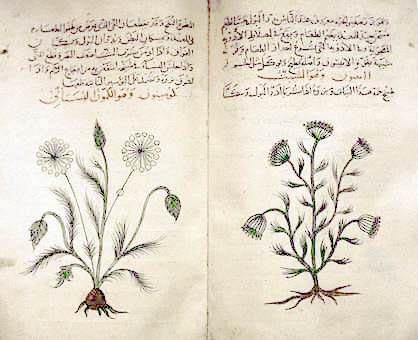
Dioscorides’ Materia Medica, c. 1334 copy in Arabic, describes medicinal features of various plants.

Pharmacognosy is the study of crude drugs obtained from medicinal plants, animals, fungi, and other natural sources. The American Society of Pharmacognosy defines pharmacognosy as "the study of the physical, chemical, biochemical, and biological properties of drugs, drug substances, or potential drugs or drug substances of natural origin as well as the search for new drugs from natural sources".

== Description ==
The word "pharmacognosy" is derived from two Greek words: φάρμακον, pharmakon (drug), and γνῶσις gnosis (knowledge) or the Latin verb cognosco (con, 'with', and gnōscō, 'know'; itself a cognate of the Greek verb γι(γ)νώσκω, gi(g)nósko, meaning 'I know, perceive'), meaning 'to conceptualize' or 'to recognize'.

The term "pharmacognosy" was used for the first time by the German physician Johann Adam Schmidt (1759–1809) in his published book Lehrbuch der Materia Medica in 1811, and by Anotheus Seydler in 1815, in his Analecta Pharmacognostica.

Originally—during the 19th century and the beginning of the 20th century—"pharmacognosy" was used to define the branch of medicine or commodity sciences (Warenkunde in German) which deals with drugs in their crude, or unprepared form. Crude drugs are the dried, unprepared material of plant, animal or mineral origin, used for medicine. The study of these materials under the name Pharmakognosie was first developed in German-speaking areas of Europe, while other language areas often used the older term materia medica taken from the works of Galen and Dioscorides. In German, the term Drogenkunde ("science of crude drugs") is also used synonymously.

As late as the beginning of the 20th century, the subject had developed mainly on the botanical side, being particularly concerned with the description and identification of drugs both in their whole state and in powder form. Such branches of pharmacognosy are still of fundamental importance, particularly for botanical products (widely available as dietary supplements in the U.S. and Canada), quality control purposes, pharmacopoeial protocols and related health regulatory frameworks. At the same time, development in other areas of research has enormously expanded the subject. The advent of the 21st century brought a renaissance of pharmacognosy, and its conventional botanical approach has been broadened up to molecular and metabolomic levels.

In addition to the previously mentioned definition, the American Society of Pharmacognosy defines pharmacognosy as "the study of natural product molecules (typically secondary metabolites) that are useful for their medicinal, ecological, gustatory, or other functional properties." Similarly, the mission of the Pharmacognosy Institute at the University of Illinois at Chicago involves plant-based and plant-related health products for the benefit of human health. Other definitions are more encompassing, drawing on a broad spectrum of biological subjects, including botany, ethnobotany, marine biology, microbiology, herbal medicine, chemistry, biotechnology, phytochemistry, pharmacology, pharmaceutics, clinical pharmacy, and pharmacy practice.

- medical ethnobotany: the study of traditional uses of plants for medicinal purposes;
- ethnopharmacology: the study of pharmacological qualities of traditional medicinal substances;
- phytotherapy: the study of medicinal use of plant extracts;
- phytochemistry: the study of chemicals derived from plants (including the identification of new drug candidates derived from plant sources);
- zoopharmacognosy: the process by which animals self-medicate, by selecting and using plants, soils, and insects to treat and prevent disease;
- marine pharmacognosy: the study of chemicals derived from marine organisms.

== Biological background ==
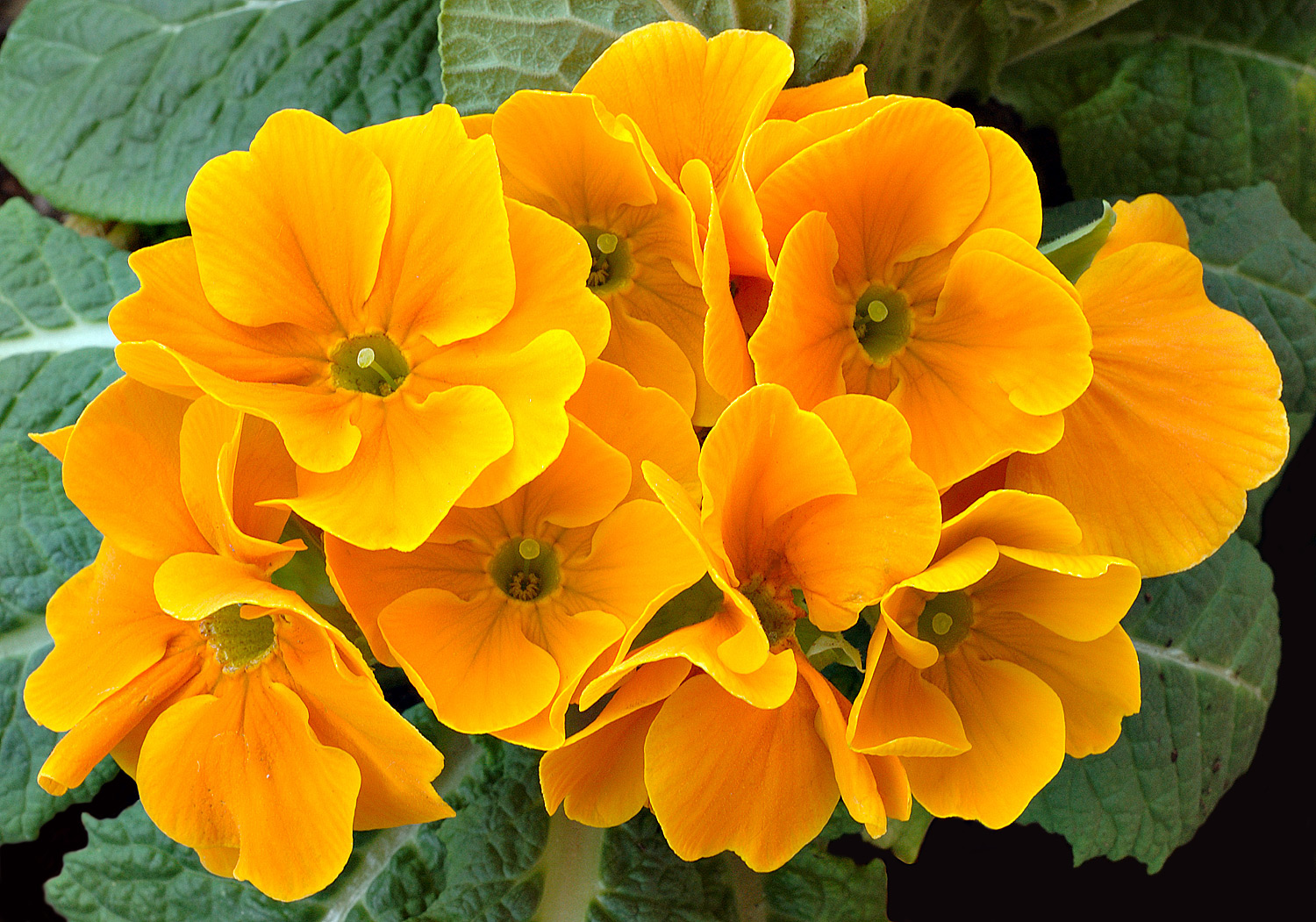
The carotenoids in primrose produce bright red, yellow and orange shades.

All plants produce chemical compounds as part of their normal metabolic activities. These phytochemicals are divided into (1) primary metabolites such as sugars and fats, which are found in all plants; and (2) secondary metabolites—compounds which are found in a smaller range of plants, serving more specific functions. For example, some secondary metabolites are toxins used by plants to deter predation and others are pheromones used to attract insects for pollination. It is these secondary metabolites and pigments that can have therapeutic actions in humans and which can be refined to produce drugs—examples are inulin from the roots of dahlias, quinine from the cinchona, THC and CBD from the flowers of cannabis, morphine and codeine from the poppy, and digoxin from the foxglove.

Plants synthesize a variety of phytochemicals, but most are derivatives:

- Alkaloids are a class of chemical compounds containing a nitrogen ring. Alkaloids are produced by a large variety of organisms, including bacteria, fungi, plants, and animals, and are part of the group of natural products (also called secondary metabolites). Many alkaloids can be purified from crude extracts by acid-base extraction. Many alkaloids are toxic to other organisms.
- Polyphenols (a.k.a. phenolics) are compounds that contain phenol rings. The anthocyanins that give grapes their purple color, the isoflavones, the phytoestrogens from soy and the tannins that give tea its astringency are phenolics.
- Glycosides are molecules in which a sugar is bound to a non-carbohydrate moiety, usually a small organic molecule. Glycosides play numerous important roles in living organisms. Many plants store chemicals in the form of inactive glycosides. These can be activated by enzyme hydrolysis, which causes the sugar part to be broken off, making the chemical available for use.
- Terpenes are a large and diverse class of organic compounds, produced by a variety of plants, particularly conifers, which are often strong smelling and thus may have a protective function. They are the major components of resins, and of turpentine produced from resins. When terpenes are modified chemically, such as by oxidation or rearrangement of the carbon skeleton, the resulting compounds are generally referred to as terpenoids. Terpenes and terpenoids are the primary constituents of the essential oils of many types of plants and flowers. Essential oils are used widely as natural flavor additives for food, as fragrances in perfumery, and in traditional and alternative medicines such as aromatherapy. Synthetic variations and derivatives of natural terpenes and terpenoids also greatly expand the variety of aromas used in perfumery and flavors used in food additives. The fragrance of rose and lavender is due to monoterpenes. The carotenoids produce shades of red, yellow and orange in pumpkin, maize, and tomatoes.

=== Natural products chemistry ===
Digoxin is a purified cardiac glycoside that is extracted from the foxglove plant, Digitalis lanata. Digoxin is widely used in the treatment of various heart conditions.

A typical protocol to isolate a pure chemical agent from natural origin is bioassay-guided fractionation, meaning step-by-step separation of extracted components based on differences in their physicochemical properties, and assessing the biological activity, followed by next round of separation and assaying. Typically, such work is initiated after a given crude drug formulation (typically prepared by solvent extraction of the natural material) is deemed "active" in a particular in vitro assay. If the end-goal of the work at hand is to identify which one(s) of the scores or hundreds of compounds are responsible for the observed in vitro activity, the path to that end is fairly straightforward:

1. fractionate the crude extract, e.g. by solvent partitioning or chromatography.
2. test the fractions thereby generated with in vitro assays.
3. repeat steps 1) and 2) until pure, active compounds are obtained.
4. determine structure(s) of active compound(s), typically by using spectroscopic methods.

In vitro activity does not necessarily translate to biological activity in humans or other living systems.

=== Herbal ===
In the past, in some countries in Asia and Africa, up to 80% of the population may rely on traditional medicine (including herbal medicine) for primary health care. Native American cultures have also relied on traditional medicine such as ceremonial smoking of tobacco, potlatch ceremonies, and herbalism, to name a few, prior to European colonization. Knowledge of traditional medicinal practices is disappearing in indigenous communities, particularly in the Amazon.

With worldwide research into pharmacology as well as medicine, traditional medicines or ancient herbal medicines are often translated into modern remedies, such as the anti-malarial group of drugs called artemisinin isolated from Artemisia annua herb, a herb that was known in Chinese medicine to treat fever. However, it was found that its plant extracts had antimalarial activity, leading to the Nobel Prize winning discovery of artemisinin.

== Microscopical evaluation ==
Microscopic evaluation is essential for the initial identification of herbs, identifying small fragments of crude or powdered herbs, identifying adulterants (such as insects, animal feces, mold, fungi, etc.), and recognizing the plant by its characteristic tissue features. Techniques such as microscopic linear measurements, determination of leaf constants, and quantitative microscopy are also utilized in this evaluation. The determination of leaf constants includes stomatal number, stomatal index, vein islet number, vein termination number, and palisade ratio.

The stomatal index is the percentage formed by the number of stomata divided by the total number of epidermal cells, with each stoma being counted as one cell.

$S.I.= \frac{S}{E+S}\times100$

where:

S.I. is the stomatal index

S is the number of stomata per unit area

E is the number of epidermal cells in the same unit area.

== See also ==
- Bioprospecting
- Botanical drug
- Ethnopharmacology
- List of plants used in herbalism
- Medicinal plants
- Natural product
- Phytotherapy
