= Crude drug =

Unrefined medications in their raw or natural forms

Crude drugs are commercially available drugs derived from plant, animal, mineral, and microbial origin that contain natural substances that have undergone only the processes of collection and drying. The term natural substances refers to those substances found in nature that have not had man-made changes made in their molecular structure. They are used as medicine for humans and animals, internally and externally for curing diseases, e.g., Senna and Cinchona.

A crude drug is any naturally occurring, unrefined substance derived from organic or inorganic sources such as plant, animal, mineral, bacteria, organs or whole organisms intended for use in the diagnosis, cure, mitigation, treatment, or prevention of disease in humans or other animals.

== Overview ==
1916 Eli Lilly crude drug case for pharmacy students to study: contains 216 different specimens

Crude drugs are unrefined natural medications in their raw forms. Prior to the 1950s, every pharmacy student learned about crude drugs in pharmacognosy class. Pharmacognosy is the study of the proper horticulture, harvesting and uses of the raw medications found in nature.

Raising, harvesting and selling crude drugs was how many large pharmaceutical companies started out. Companies such as Eli Lilly and Company sold crude drugs to pharmacists to save them time and money, but the early pharmacy graduate would know how to raise their own crude drugs if need be.

== Morphology and organoleptic characters of crude drugs ==
Identification of the crude drug by organoleptic characters is one of the important aspects of pharmacognostical study. Morphological study follows a special terminology which must be known to a pharmacognostist. The morphological terminology is derived from botany and zoology, depending upon the source of the crude drug. In general, color, odor, taste, size, shape, and special features, like touch, texture, fracture, presence of trichomes, and presence of ridges of crude drugs are studied under morphology. Aromatic odor of umbelliferous fruits and sweet taste of liquorice are the example of this type of evaluation. The study of form of a crude drug is morphology, while description of the form is morphography.

However, shape and size of crude drugs as described in official books should only be considered as guidelines and may vary depending upon several factors. For example, color of the crude drug may fade if it gets exposed to sunlight for very long duration or if, the drug is not stored properly. Depending upon the condition under which the drug is growing or cultivated, i.e., availability of proper irrigation, fertilizers or even high temperature, may influence the size may be available and the crude drugs if grown in adverse conditions may be of small size.

Color of the flowers as in case Catharanthus roseus and Catharanthus alba, presence of thorns in case of Asparagus recemosus and absence in Asparagus officinalis, arrangement of flowers in case of Withania semnifera or Witharia coagulens can help in differentiating the varieties of the same plant.

Arrangement of cracks and wrinkles in case of stem bark of varieties of Cinchona bark, or the color of aloe can separate in varieties.

The adulteration of seed of Strychnos nux-vomica with the seed of Strrychnos nux-blanda or Strychnos potatorum, caraway with Indian dill, Alexandrian senna with dog senna or palthe senna are identified by morphological means.

In case of cellular products (unorganized drugs), form of the drug depends totally on the method of preparation of the drug. Thus, gum acacia is found in the form of ovoid tears, while tragacanth is marketed as vermiform ribbon with longitudinal striations.

== Evaluation ==
To evaluate means to identify it and to determine its quality and purity, the identity of a drug can be established by actual collection of the drug from a plant or animal that has been positively identified. The evaluation of drug involves a number of methods that may be classified as follows:

1. Organoleptic and morphological evaluation: Evaluation by means of organs of senses; knowing the color, odor, taste, size, shape and special features like texture.
2. Microscopic: For identification of the pure powdered drug. This method allows more detailed examination of a drug and their identification by their known histological characters. Microscope by the virtue of its property to magnify, permits minute sections under study to enlarge so that leaf constants, stomatal index, palisade ratio can be determined.
3. Biologic: Pharmacological activities of drugs are evaluated by bioassays. When the estimation of potency of crude drug or its preparations are done by means of measuring its effect on living organisms like bacteria, fungal growth, or animal tissue, it is known as biological effect of the drug, compared to the standard drug. By these methods, a crude drug can be assessed and further clinical trial can be recommended.
4. Chemical: Chemical assays are best to determine potency and active constituents. It comprises different test and assays. The isolation, purification and identification of active constituents are the methods of evaluation. Quantitative chemical test such as acid value, saponification value etc. are also covered under these techniques.
5. Physical: Physical constants are applied to active principles. These are helpful in evaluation with reference to moisture content, specific gravity, density, optic rotation etc.

== History ==
Creighton University College of Pharmacy crude drugs circa 1910

The usage of crude drugs dates to prehistoric times. Traditional medicine often incorporates the gathering and preparation of material from natural sources, particularly herbs. In such practice, the active ingredients and method of action are largely unknown to the practitioner.

In recent history, the development of modern chemistry and application of the scientific method shaped the use of crude drugs. Eventually, the use of crude drugs reach a zenith in the early 1900s and eventually gave way to the use of purified active ingredients from the natural source. Currently the use and exploration of crude drugs has again gained prominence in the medical community. The realization that many completely unknown substances are yet to be discovered from crude drugs has created a new interest in pharmacognosy and has led to many medical breakthroughs.

In 1907, the Pure Food and Drug Act was implemented and standardization of crude drugs took place. Often the USP would specify what percentage of active ingredient was needed to claim a crude drug met USP standards.

An example of standardization would be as follows (from the United States Pharmacopeia):

Opium is the air-dried milky exudate obtained by incising the unripe capsules of Papaver somniferum Linne or its variety album De Candolle (Fam. Papaveraceae). Opium in its normal air-dried condition yields not less than 9.5 percent of anhydrous morphine.

== Use in Chinese medicine ==
Crude medicine (simplified Chinese: 药材; traditional Chinese: 藥材; pinyin: yàocái), (also known as crude drug in the Chinese materia medica) are bulk drugs from the Chinese materia medica basic processing and treatment.

== See also ==
- Traditional Chinese medicine
- Chinese herbology
- Chinese patent medicine
