= Jerry L. McLaughlin =

Jerry L. McLaughlin is a researcher who has conducted research for 28 years studying plants looking for molecules that fight cancer at Purdue University's School of Pharmacy. He published his findings on the Annonaceous acetogenins in peer reviewed journals. These acetogenins have been identified as having a number of effects, including acting as potential anticancer agents.

As a member of the American Society of Pharmacognosy, he served as a term as president 1982-83 and edited the Journal of Natural Products, their publication for a few years. He received the Tyler Prize from them in 2007.
