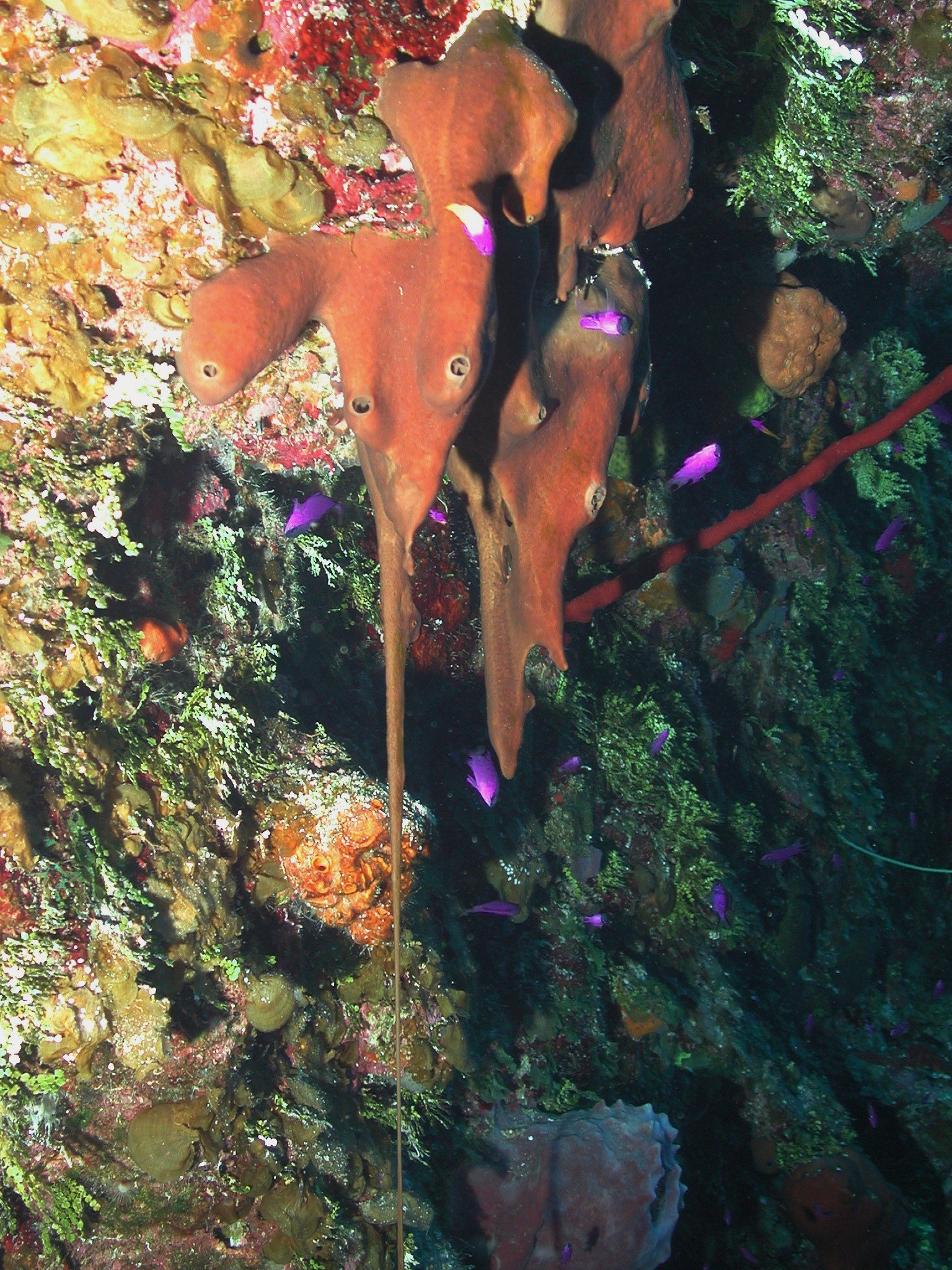
- Plakortis sp.

Scientific classification
- Kingdom: Animalia
- Phylum: Porifera
- Class: Homoscleromorpha
- Order: Homosclerophorida
- Family: Plakinidae; Schulze, 1880

Genera
- see text

= Plakinidae =

Family of sponges

Plakinidae is a family of marine sponges. It is composed of eight genera:

Plakinidae and Oscarellidae are the two families that compose the fourth and smallest class of the porifera phylum, Homoscleromorpha.

- Aspiculophora Ruiz, Muricy, Lage, Domingos, Chenesseau & Pérez, 2017
  - Aspiculophora madinina Ruiz, Muricy, Lage, Domingos, Chenesseau & Pérez, 2017
  - Aspiculophora papillata Ruiz, Ereskovsky & Pérez, 2022
- Aspiculortis Ruiz, Ereskovsky & Pérez, 2022
  - Aspiculortis garifuba Ruiz, Ereskovsky & Pérez, 2022
- Corticium Schmidt, 1862
  - Corticium acanthastrum Thomas, 1968
  - Corticium bargibanti Lévi & Lévi, 1983
  - Corticium candelabrum Schmidt, 1862
  - Corticium diamantense Ereskovsky, Lavrov & Willenz, 2014
  - Corticium furcatum Muricy, Sarmento, Lage, Almeida & Fromont, 2021
  - Corticium monolophum Muricy, Sarmento, Lage, Almeida & Fromont, 2021
  - Corticium niger Pulitzer-Finali, 1996
  - Corticium quadripartitum Topsent, 1923
  - Corticium simplex Lendenfeld, 1907
  - Corticium vaceleti Lage, Muricy, Ruiz & Pérez, 2018
  - Corticium verticillatum Muricy, Sarmento, Lage, Almeida & Fromont, 2021
- Placinolopha Topsent, 1897
  - Placinolopha acantholopha (Thomas, 1970)
  - Placinolopha bedoti Topsent, 1897
  - Placinolopha europae Vacelet & Vasseur, 1971
  - Placinolopha moncharmonti (Sarà, 1960)
  - Placinolopha sarai Lévi & Lévi, 1989
  - Placinolopha spinosa Kirkpatrick, 1900
- Plakina Schulze, 1880
  - Plakina anisoactina Lage, Gerovasileiou, Voultsiadou & Muricy, 2018
  - Plakina anomala Lage, Gerovasileiou, Voultsiadou & Muricy, 2018
  - Plakina antarctica Lendenfeld, 1907
  - Plakina arletensis Ruiz, Muricy, Lage, Domingos, Chenesseau & Pérez, 2017
  - Plakina atka Lehnert, Stone & Heimler, 2005
  - Plakina australis (Gray, 1867)
  - Plakina bioxea Green & Bakus, 1994
  - Plakina bowerbanki (Sarà, 1960)
  - Plakina brachylopha Topsent, 1927
  - Plakina cabofriensis Muricy, Domingos, Lage, Lanna, Hardoim, Laport & Zilberberg, 2019
  - Plakina coerulea Cedro, Hajdu & Correia, 2013
  - Plakina corticioides Vacelet, Vasseur & Lévi, 1976
  - Plakina corticolopha Lévi & Lévi, 1983
  - Plakina crypta Muricy, Boury-Esnault, Bézac & Vacelet, 1998
  - Plakina cyanorosea Muricy, Domingos, Lage, Lanna, Hardoim, Laport & Zilberberg, 2019
  - Plakina dilopha Schulze, 1880
  - Plakina doudou Grenier, Ruiz, Lage & Pérez, 2020
  - Plakina elisa (de Laubenfels, 1936)
  - Plakina endoumensis Muricy, Boury-Esnault, Bézac & Vacelet, 1998
  - Plakina finispinata Lage, Muricy, Ruiz & Pérez, 2018
  - Plakina fragilis Desqueyroux-Faúndez & van Soest, 1997
  - Plakina hellenica Lage, Gerovasileiou, Voultsiadou & Muricy, 2018
  - Plakina jamaicensis Lehnert & van Soest, 1998
  - Plakina jani Muricy, Boury-Esnault, Bézac & Vacelet, 1998
  - Plakina kanaky Ruiz & Pérez, 2015
  - Plakina lendenfeldi Van Soest & Hooper, 2020
  - Plakina microlobata Desqueyroux-Faúndez & van Soest, 1997
  - Plakina monolopha Schulze, 1880
  - Plakina muricyae Cruz-Barraza, Vega & Carballo, 2014
  - Plakina nathaliae (Ereskovsky, Lavrov & Willenz, 2014)
  - Plakina pacifica Desqueyroux-Faúndez & van Soest, 1997
  - Plakina paradilopha Cruz-Barraza, Vega & Carballo, 2014
  - Plakina reducta (Pulitzer-Finali, 1983)
  - Plakina strongylata Lage, Araujo, Gerovasileiou & Muricy, 2018
  - Plakina tanaga Lehnert, Stone & Heimler, 2005
  - Plakina tetralopha (Hechtel, 1965)
  - Plakina tetralophoides Muricy, Boury-Esnault, Bézac & Vacelet, 1998
  - Plakina topsenti (Pouliquen, 1972)
  - Plakina trilopha Schulze, 1880
  - Plakina versatilis (Schmidt, 1880)
  - Plakina weinbergi Muricy, Boury-Esnault, Bézac & Vacelet, 1998
- Plakinastrella Schulze, 1880
  - Plakinastrella ceylonica (Dendy, 1905)
  - Plakinastrella clathrata Kirkpatrick, 1900
  - Plakinastrella clippertonensis Van Soest, Kaiser & Van Syoc, 2011
  - Plakinastrella copiosa Schulze, 1880
  - Plakinastrella globularis Domingos, Moraes & Muricy, 2013
  - Plakinastrella mammillaris Lendenfeld, 1907
  - Plakinastrella microspiculifera Moraes & Muricy, 2003
  - Plakinastrella minor (Dendy, 1916)
  - Plakinastrella mixta Maldonado, 1992
  - Plakinastrella nicoleae Lage, Muricy, Ruiz & Pérez, 2018
  - Plakinastrella onkodes Uliczka, 1929
  - Plakinastrella osculifera Lage, Muricy, Ruiz & Pérez, 2018
  - Plakinastrella oxeata Topsent, 1904
  - Plakinastrella polysclera Lévi & Lévi, 1989
  - Plakinastrella pseudolopha Lage, Muricy, Ruiz & Pérez, 2018
  - Plakinastrella stinapa Van Soest, Meesters & Becking, 2014
  - Plakinastrella trunculifera Topsent, 1927
- Plakortis Schulze, 1880
  - Plakortis albicans Cruz-Barraza & Carballo, 2005
  - Plakortis angulospiculatus (Carter, 1882)
  - Plakortis badabaluensis Ubare & Mohan, 2016
  - Plakortis bergquistae Muricy, 2011
  - Plakortis clarionensis Cruz-Barraza, Vega & Carballo, 2014
  - Plakortis communis Muricy, 2011
  - Plakortis copiosa Pulitzer-Finali, 1993
  - Plakortis dariae Ereskovsky, Lavrov & Willenz, 2014
  - Plakortis deweerdtaephila Vicente, Zea & Hill, 2016
  - Plakortis edwardsi Ereskovsky, Lavrov & Willenz, 2014
  - Plakortis erythraena Lévi, 1958
  - Plakortis fromontae Muricy, 2011
  - Plakortis galapagensis Desqueyroux-Faúndez & van Soest, 1997
  - Plakortis halichondrioides (Wilson, 1902)
  - Plakortis hooperi Muricy, 2011
  - Plakortis insularis Moraes & Muricy, 2003
  - Plakortis japonica (Hoshino, 1977)
  - Plakortis kenyensis Pulitzer-Finali, 1993
  - Plakortis lita de Laubenfels, 1954
  - Plakortis mesophotica Idan, Shefer, Feldstein & Ilan, 2021
  - Plakortis microrhabdifera Moraes & Muricy, 2003
  - Plakortis myrae Ereskovsky, Lavrov & Willenz, 2014
  - Plakortis nigra Lévi, 1953
  - Plakortis petrupaulensis Domingos, Moraes & Muricy, 2013
  - Plakortis potiguarensis Domingos, Moraes & Muricy, 2013
  - Plakortis pulvillus Samaai, Pillay & Janson, 2019
  - Plakortis quasiamphiaster Díaz & van Soest, 1994
  - Plakortis ruetzleri Lage, Muricy, Ruiz & Pérez, 2018
  - Plakortis simplex Schulze, 1880
  - Plakortis spinalis Domingos, Moraes & Muricy, 2013
  - Plakortis symbiotica Vicente, Zea & Hill, 2016
  - Plakortis zyggompha (de Laubenfels, 1934)
- Tetralophophora Rützler, Piantoni, van Soest & Díaz 2014
  - Tetralophophora mesoamericana Rützler, Piantoni, van Soest & Díaz 2014
