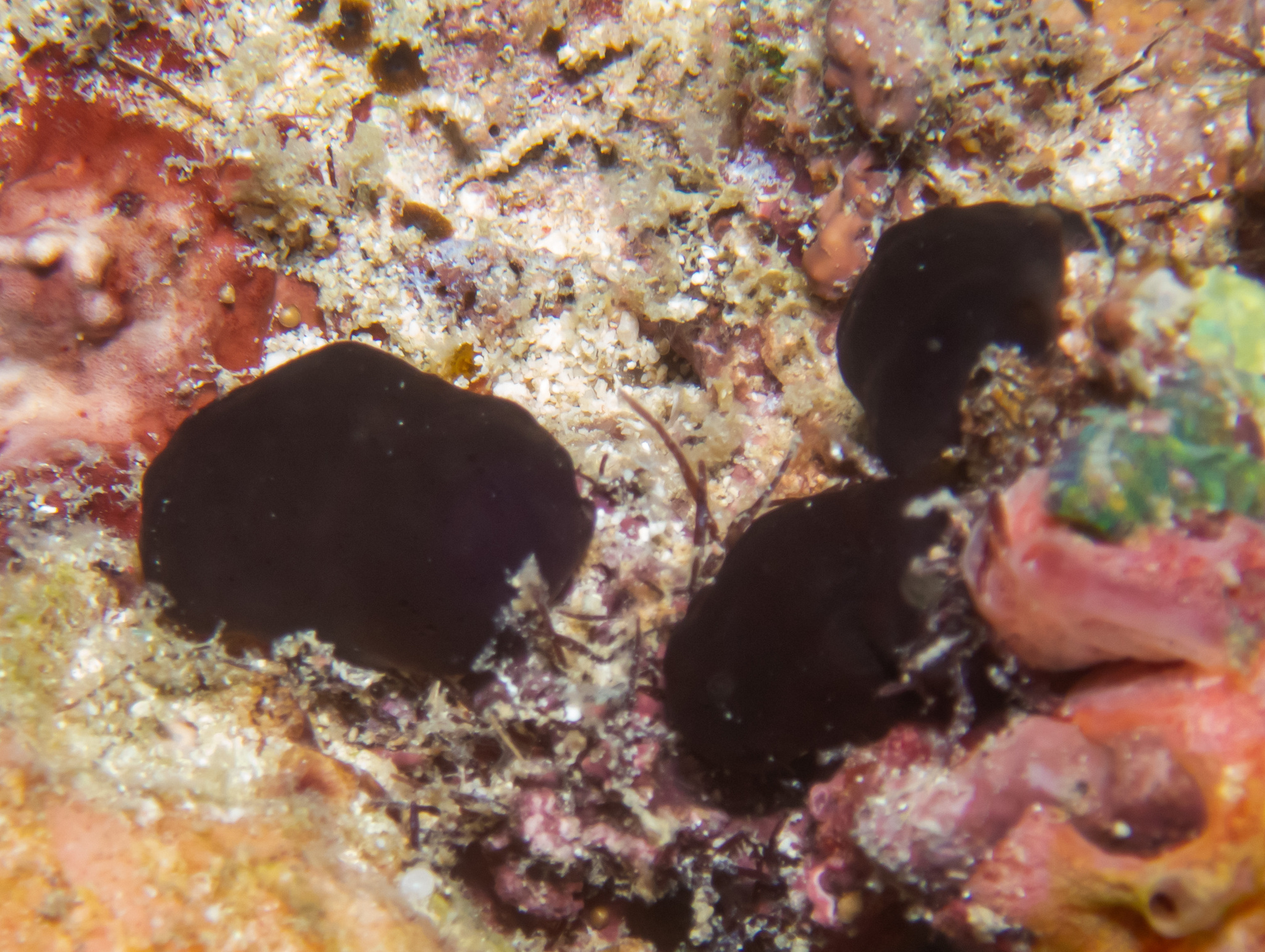
- Corticium niger

Scientific classification
- Kingdom: Animalia
- Phylum: Porifera
- Class: Homoscleromorpha
- Order: Homosclerophorida
- Family: Plakinidae
- Genus: Corticium; Schmidt, 1862

Type species
- Corticium candelabrum Schmidt, 1862

= Corticium (sponge) =

Genus of sponges

Corticium is a genus of sponges in the order Homosclerophorida first described by Eduard Oscar Schmidt in 1862.

== Species ==
Accepted species as given by WoRMS:

- Corticium acanthastrum Thomas, 1968
- Corticium bargibanti Lévi & Lévi, 1983
- Corticium candelabrum Schmidt, 1862
- Corticium diamantense Ereskovsky, Lavrov & Willenz, 2014
- Corticium furcatum Muricy, Sarmento, Lage, Almeida & Fromont, 2021
- Corticium monolophum Muricy, Sarmento, Lage, Almeida & Fromont, 2021
- Corticium niger Pulitzer-Finali, 1996
- Corticium quadripartitum Topsent, 1923
- Corticium simplex Lendenfeld, 1907
- Corticium vaceleti Lage, Muricy, Ruiz & Pérez, 2018
- Corticium verticillatum Muricy, Sarmento, Lage, Almeida & Fromont, 2021
