= American Society of Pharmacognosy =

American scientific society

- Abbreviation: ASP
- Predecessor: Plant Science Seminar
- Formation: 1959; 67 years ago
- Founded at: Chicago, IL, US
- Type: Professional organization
- Purpose: Encouraging research and development in the physical, engineering, and life sciences
- Location: Northbrook, IL, US
- Region served: Multinational
- Fields: Pharmacognosy
- Members: 1,100 (2016)
- Official language: English
- President: Kerry McPhail
- Vice president: Tawnya McKee
- Main organ: Journal of Natural Products
- Budget: $788,916 (2022)
- Staff: 1 (2022)
- Awards: ASP General Student Travel Grants, ASP Research Starter Grant, Matt Suffness (Young Investigators Symposium) Award, Norman R. Farnsworth Research Achievement Award
- Website: www.pharmacognosy.us

The American Society of Pharmacognosy (ASP) is a scientific society that promotes the growth and development of pharmacognosy through presentation of research achievements and publication of meritorious research.

ASP was founded in 1959 as an outgrowth of the Plant Science Seminar established in 1923. ASP has over 1,100 active and associate members. Approximately 40 percent of the active members reside outside the U.S. and Canada in more than 60 countries.

Pharmacognosy includes the study of the physical, chemical, biochemical and biological properties of drugs, drug substances, or potential drugs or drug substances of natural origin as well as the search for new drugs from natural sources. Research problems in pharmacognosy include studies in the areas of phytochemistry, microbial chemistry, biosynthesis, biotransformation, chemotaxonomy and other biological and chemical sciences.

ASP publishes the quarterly ASP Newsletter and co-publishes the Journal of Natural Products with the American Chemical Society.

An ASP Fellow, Satoshi Ōmura, was awarded the 2015 Nobel Prize in Physiology or Medicine along with two other researchers for their work in researching therapies for roundworm parasite and malaria infections. Ōmura is also a past recipient of the ASP Norman R. Farnsworth Research Achievement Award (2013) for his work on novel bacterial strains, such as Streptomyces avermitilis, and their bioactive constituents.

== See also ==
- Jerry L. McLaughlin, past ASP president (1982-83)
