= Journal of Natural Products =

- Discipline: Biochemistry
- Language: English
- Edited by: Philip J. Proteau

Publication details
- Former name(s): Lloydia
- History: 1938–present
- Publisher: American Chemical Society (United States)
- Frequency: Monthly
- Impact factor: 5.1 (2022)

Standard abbreviations
- ISO 4: J. Nat. Prod.

Indexing
- CODEN: JNPRDF
- ISSN: 0163-3864 (print); 1520-6025 (web)
- LCCN: 80643966
- OCLC no.: 04359563

Links
- Journal homepage; Online access; Online archive

The Journal of Natural Products is a monthly peer-reviewed scientific journal covering all aspects of research on the chemistry and/or biochemistry of naturally occurring compounds. It is co-published by the American Society of Pharmacognosy and the American Chemical Society. The editor-in-chief is Philip J. Proteau (Oregon State University).

== History ==
The journal was established in 1938 as Lloydia, published by the Lloyd Library and Museum, and obtained its present title in 1979. It has been the official journal of the American Society of Pharmacognosy since 1961. Originally a quarterly publication, it became a bimonthly journal in 1975, and has appeared monthly since 1992. The American Society of Pharmacognosy began to co-publish the journal with the American Chemical Society in 1996. In 2008, the journal was hijacked by a low-quality open access journal using the same title. As of January 2016, this counterfeit journal was still active.

== Abstracting and indexing ==
The journal is abstracted and indexed in:

- Biological Abstracts
- BIOSIS Previews
- Chemical Abstracts Service
- Current Contents/Agriculture, Biology & Environmental Sciences
- Current Contents/Life Sciences
- EBSCO databases
- Index Medicus/MEDLINE/PubMed
- Science Citation Index
- Scopus
- The Zoological Record

According to the Journal Citation Reports, the journal has a 2022 impact factor of 5.1.

== See also ==
- Jerry L. McLaughlin
