= Guilherme Muricy =

Brazilian zoologist

Guilherme Muricy (born 1964) is a Brazilian invertebrate zoologist, and Professor of Invertebrate Zoology at the National Museum of Brazil. He is a specialist in sponges and has written over 100 papers on the chemistry, the taxonomy of sponges, and the descriptions of many new sponge species.

His zoological author abbreviation is Muricy.

== Taxa named by Muricy ==
See Taxa named by Guilherme Muricy.
