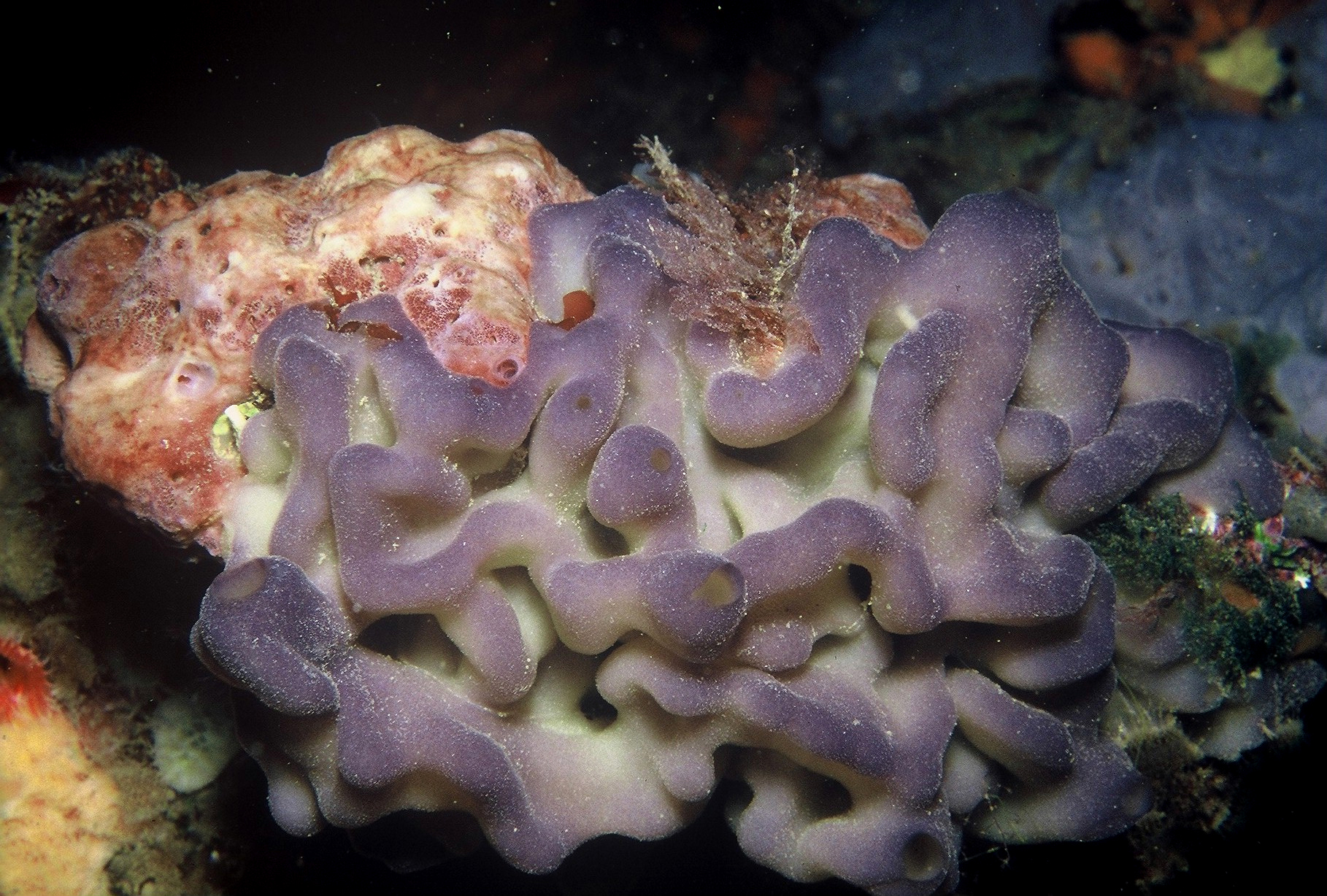
- Oscarella lobularis
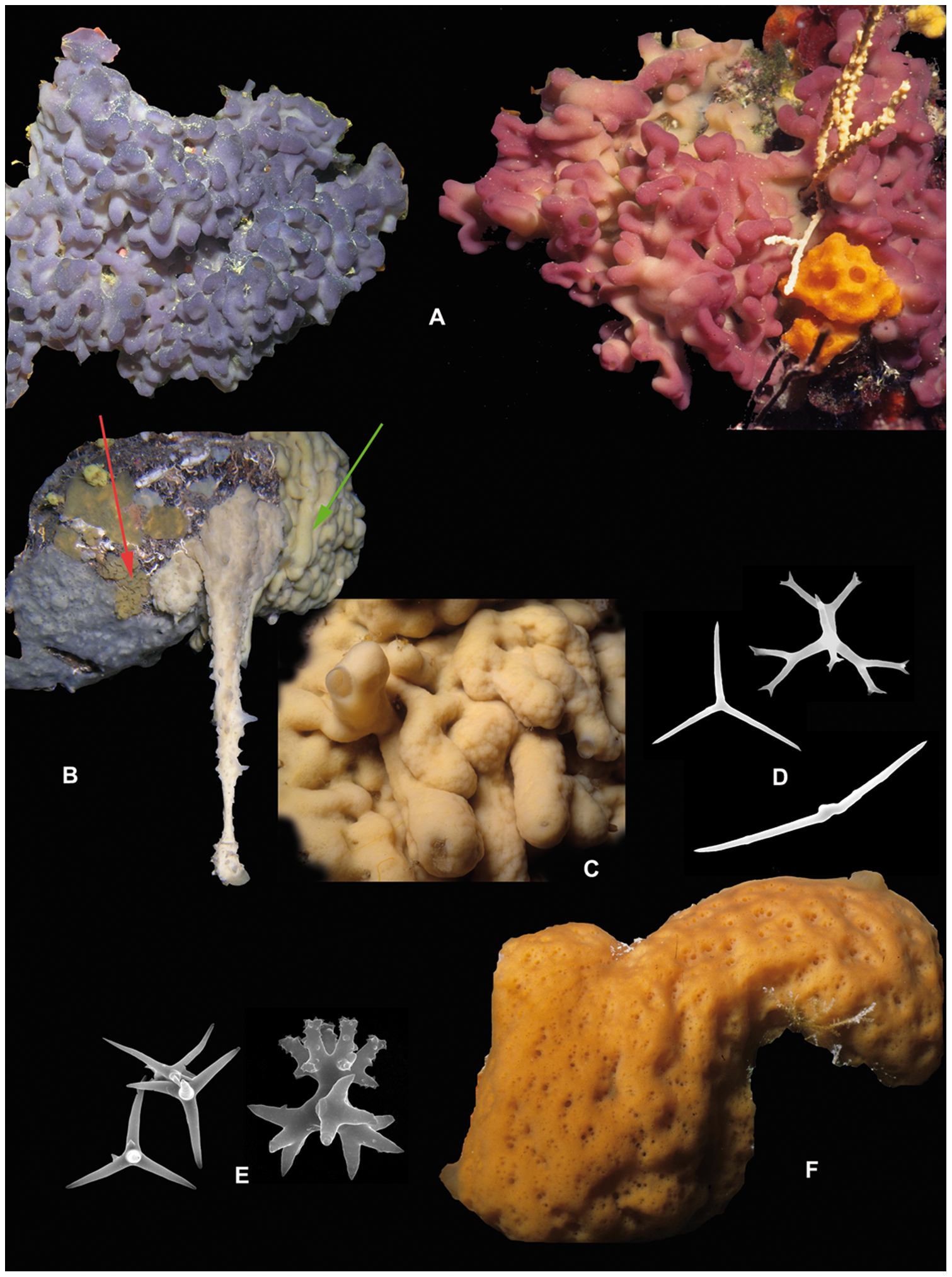
- Homoscleromoph diversity. From top left to bottom right they are: Oscarella lobularis, Plakortis simplex, Oscarella microlobata (red arrow) with Plakina jani (green arrow), Plakina jani, various spicules of Plakinidae, spicules of Corticium candelabrum and heterolophose calthrops and lastly Corticium candelabrum.

Scientific classification
- Kingdom: Animalia
- Phylum: Porifera
- Class: Homoscleromorpha; Bergquist, 1978
- Order: Homosclerophorida; Dendy, 1905

Families
- Plakinidae Schulze, 1880; Oscarellidae Lendenfeld, 1887

= Homosclerophorida =

Order of marine sponges

Homosclerophorida is an order of marine sponges that belongs to the monotypic class Homoscleromorpha. Members of this family are exclusively marine, inhabiting shallow waters. The order is small, comprising somewhat more than 100 described species. These species are placed into around seven genera that belong to one of two families: Plakinidae and Oscarellidae.

The fossil record of Homosclerophorid sponges is poor because of to their sometimes present reduced and poorly organized siliceous skeleton. Their fossil record goes back at least to the early Carboniferous period. They also have fossil records during the Early and Upper Jurassic period.

== Taxonomy ==
Homoscleromorpha is recognized as the fourth class of sponges being phylogenetically well separated from Demospongiae and other sponge groups. On the basis of molecular and morphological evidence, the two families Plakinidae and Oscarellidae have been reinstated. There are 136 species in this group that are divided into 10 genera. The spiculate genera in this group are Aspiculophora, Aspiculortis, Corticium, Placinolopha, Plakina, Plakinasterella, Plakortis and Tetralophophora. The aspiculate species are the genera Oscarella and Pseudocorticium.

Sponges of this class share some morphological features with members of eumetazoa, a subkingdom of Animalia being a sister group to Porifera. Because of this, it has been suggested that Homoscleromorpha are more closely related to eumetazoans than to the other sponge groups, rendering sponges as a paraphyletic group. However this view has not been supported by later work that uses larger datasets and new techniques for phylogenetic inference, which tend to support sponges as monophyletic, with Homoscleromorpha grouping together with Calcarea.

== Habitat ==
Homoscleromorpha are exclusively marine sponges that tend to encrust onto hard substratum communities and other surfaces at shallow depths from 8-60 meters, although they can be found at depths below 1000 meters. These sponges typically inhabit shady locations, semi-dark to dark conditions, under overhangs and inside caves.

== Description ==
These sponges have a great variability of forms so the following description is their general organization and shared features. They are massive abd encrusting in form and have a very simple structure with very little variation in spicule form (all spicules tend to be very small). Reproduction is viviparous and the larva is an oval form known as an amphiblastula. This form is usual in calcareous sponges but is less common in other sponges. The skeletal has a peculiar type of tetractines spicule called calthrops that are distinguishable from those of Demospongiae and their derivatives. This can be done because of their small size, ramification or reduction of one to all four actines and by the presence of an amorphous axial filament. They are also characterized by an aquiferous system that has either a sylleibid-like or leuconoid type organization with either a eurypylous, diplodal or aphodal choanocyte chambers.

== Ecology ==
In some areas, Homosclerophorid sponges can dominate an area and seem to be strong competitors for space overgrowing large sponges, sea fans and erect bryozoans.

Sponges in the Mediterranean Sea are often seen dominating marine benthic communities, especially on hard substrates. In the Mediterranean Sea, 82% of the species in this taxon can be found in caves, and 41% of them are found nowhere else making them endemic.
