= Duțescu =

Duțescu is a surname. Notable people with the surname include:

- Dan Duţescu (1918–1992), Romanian professor of English language and literature
- Roberto Dutesco (born Duțescu, 1961), Romanian-born Canadian artist, photographer, and filmmaker
