= 1946 Atlantic hurricane season =

- Season summary map

Seasonal boundaries
- First system formed: June 13, 1946
- Last system dissipated: November 3, 1946

Strongest storm
- Name: Four
  - Maximum winds: 100 mph (155 km/h) (1-minute sustained)
  - Lowest pressure: 975 mbar (hPa; 28.79 inHg)

Seasonal statistics
- Total depressions: 8
- Total storms: 7
- Hurricanes: 3
- Major hurricanes (Cat. 3+): 0
- Total fatalities: 5
- Total damage: > $5.2 million (1946 USD)

Related articles
- 1942–1948 Pacific hurricane seasons; 1946 Pacific typhoon season; 1940s North Indian Ocean cyclone seasons

The 1946 Atlantic hurricane season resulted in no fatalities in the United States. The season officially began on June 15, 1946, and lasted until November 15, 1946. These dates conventionally delimit the period of each year when most tropical cyclones form in the Atlantic basin. However, the first storm, developed in the Gulf of Mexico on June 13, while the final system dissipated just offshore Florida on November 3. There were seven tropical storms; three of them attained hurricane status, while none intensified into major hurricanes, which are Category 3 or higher on the modern-day Saffir–Simpson hurricane wind scale. This had not occurred since 1940 and would not again until 1968. Operationally, the fifth tropical storm, which existed near the Azores in early October, was not considered a tropical cyclone but was added to HURDAT in 2014.

Although every tropical storm impacted land, effects overall were light, with less than $10 million (1946 USD) in damage and no deaths in the United States throughout the season. The season's most intense cyclone was the fourth hurricane. While the storm was moving northeastward offshore the East Coast of the United States, the Norwegian tanker Maril II was destroyed at sea, causing 16 drownings; the incident could not be directly attributed to the hurricane. The second storm brought relatively minor damage to the Cape Fear region of North Carolina after striking the state early in its duration. While an extratropical cyclone, the remnants of the fifth cyclone devastated a few islands of the Azores and left 120 fishermen missing. The Florida hurricane severely damaged sugar cane in western Cuba and caused five deaths in the island nation. Additionally, the storm left $5.2 million in damage in Florida, mostly inflicting citrus crops. The final storm caused several millions of dollars in damage to crops near Lake Okeechobee.

== Season summary ==
The Atlantic hurricane season officially began on June 16, 1946. However, tropical cyclogenesis began on June 13, three days before the official start of the season. There was a total of seven tropical storms, slightly below the contemporaneous 20-year average of 8.5 per season. Three of those strengthened into hurricanes, while none reached major hurricane status – Category 3 or higher on the modern-day Saffir–Simpson hurricane wind scale – for the first time since 1940 and it was a phenomenon that would not occur again until 1968. One hurricane made landfall in the United States, while the two other storms with winds of at least 74 mph (119 km/h) remained at sea during their strongest intensities. Overall in the United States, the season resulted in less than $10 million in damage and no deaths. Collectively, the storms of the season left at least $5.2 million in damage. The final cyclone of the season dissipated on November 3, 12 days before the official end of the season on November 15, 1946.

Tropical cyclogenesis began with the development of a tropical storm over the Gulf of Mexico on June 13. The next system formed offshore the Southeastern United States on July 5. Activity then ceased for nearly seven weeks, until August 25, when the third storm originated in the Bay of Campeche. Although September is the climatological peak of hurricane season, there was only one tropical cyclone that strengthened to tropical storm status that month. The season's most intense storm developed on September 12 and later peaked as a Category 2 hurricane with maximum sustained winds of 100 mph (160 km/h) and a lowest known barometric pressure of 975 millibars (28.8 inHg). Additionally, a tropical depression briefly existed near Central America. October was the most active month of the season, with three tropical cyclones. The third storm in October, which was the last system of the season, lasted until November 3.

The season's activity was reflected with an accumulated cyclone energy (ACE) rating of 20, the lowest total since 1925 and until 1983. ACE is, broadly speaking, a measure of the power of the hurricane multiplied by the length of time it existed, so storms that last a long time, as well as particularly strong hurricanes, have high ACEs. It is only calculated for full advisories on tropical systems at or exceeding 39 mph (63 km/h), which is tropical storm strength.

== Systems ==
=== Tropical Storm One ===
- Tropical storm (SSHWS)
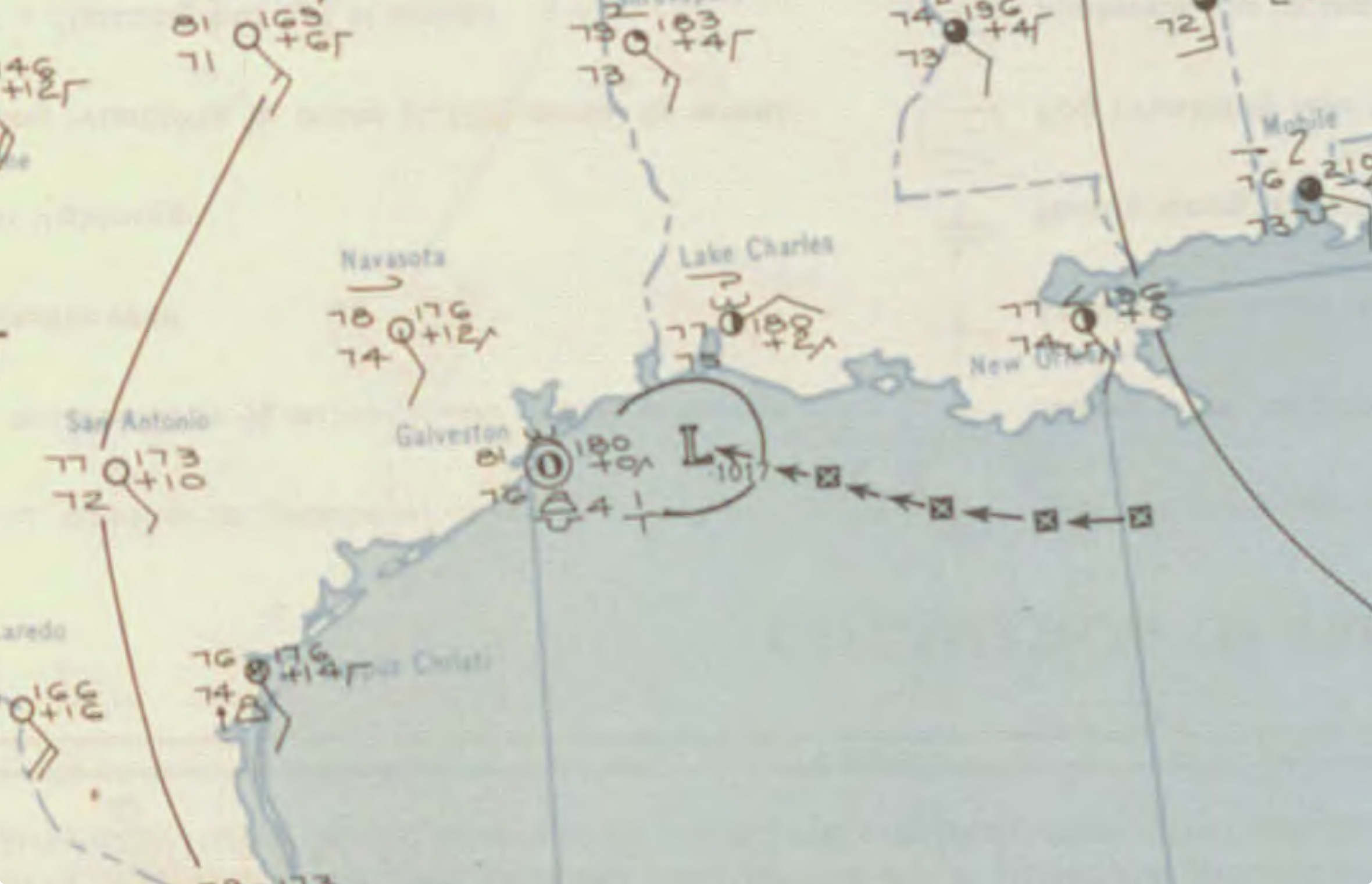
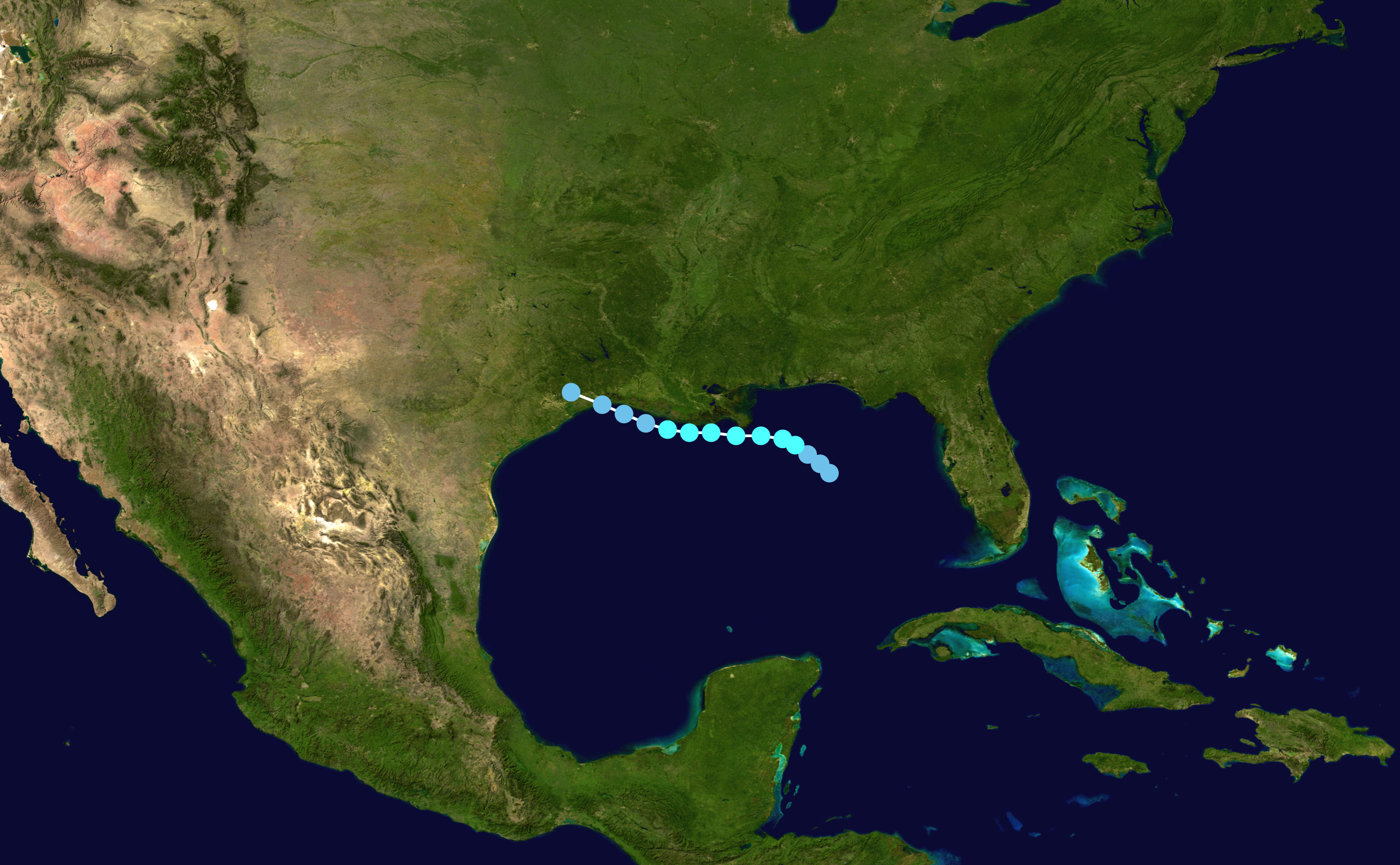
- Duration: June 13 – June 16
- Peak intensity: 40 mph (65 km/h) (1-min); ≤1014 mbar (hPa)

A disturbance accompanied by a small area of convection developed into a tropical depression about 165 miles (266 km) south-southwest of Cape San Blas, Florida, at 12:00 UTC on June 13. Moving slowly northwestward, the depression intensified into a tropical storm early on the next day. The storm did not deepen beyond maximum sustained winds of 40 mph (64 km/h), while historical weather maps indicated a barometric pressure of 1,014 millibars (29.9 inHg) on June 15, the lowest in relation to the storm. Later that day, the cyclone weakened to a tropical depression offshore Louisiana. The storm made landfall just east of the Louisiana–Texas border on June 16 and rapidly dissipated. It may have remained a tropical depression throughout its lifespan but data was inconclusive. Winds of 36 mph (58 km/h) were observed at Grand Isle, Louisiana, while winds of "gentle to moderate force" occurred in Texas. In December 1946, H. C. Sumner, a meteorologist at the United States Weather Bureau office in Washington, D.C., published a paper, stating this tropical system occurred between June 14-16. A later publication in HURDAT from the National Hurricane Center stated this system started on June 13 rather than June 14.

=== Hurricane Two ===
- Category 1 hurricane (SSHWS)
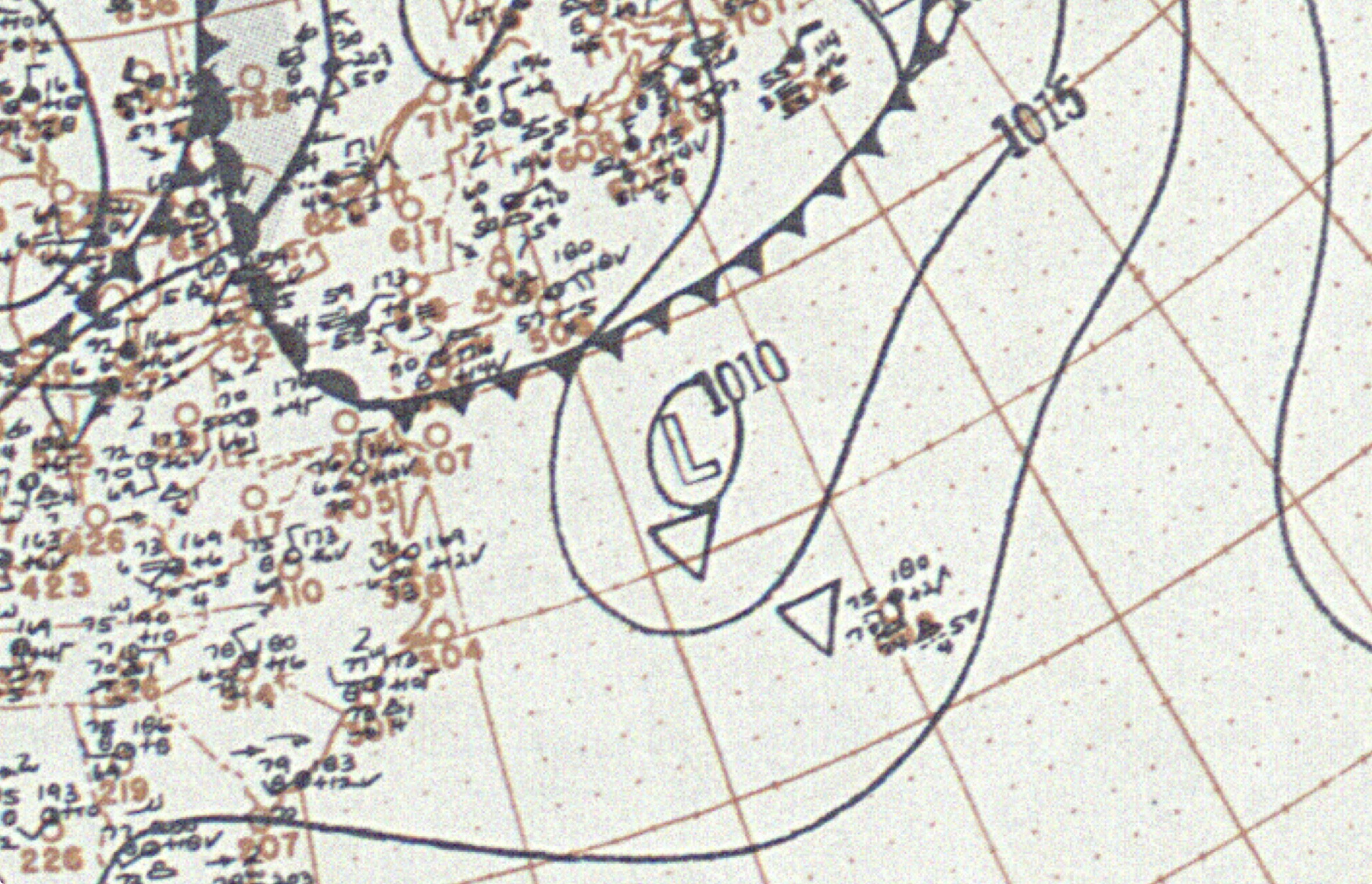
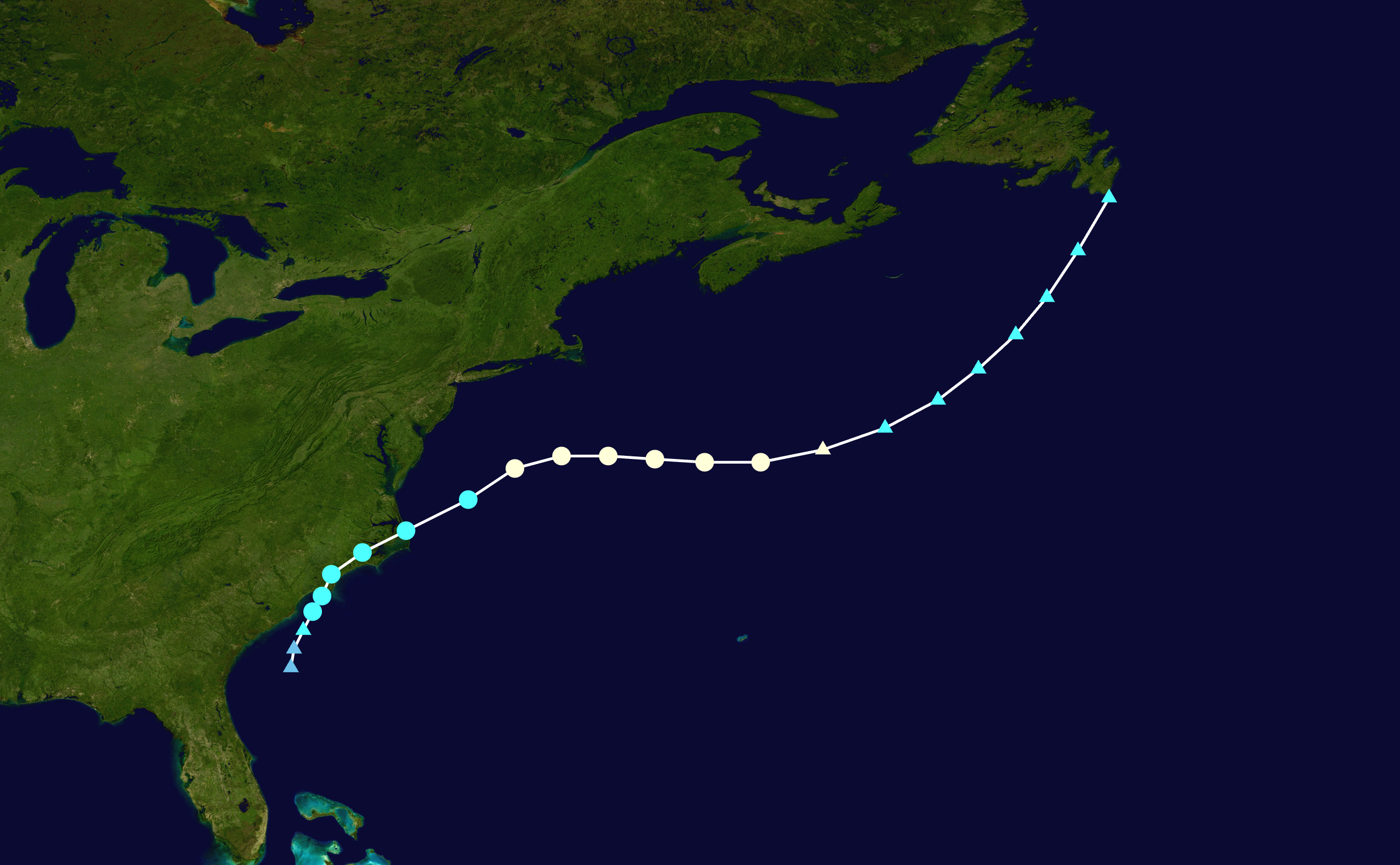
- Duration: July 6 – July 9
- Peak intensity: 80 mph (130 km/h) (1-min); ≤1005 mbar (hPa)

The interaction between a frontal boundary and a tropical wave resulted in the development of an extratropical cyclone on July 5 offshore the Southeastern United States. Throughout the day, the storm acquired tropical characteristics. Around 00:00 UTC on July 6, the system transitioned into a tropical storm while located about 35 mi (56 km) south-southeast of Myrtle Beach, South Carolina. The cyclone moved northeastward and made landfall near Oak Island, North Carolina, around 08:00 UTC with winds of 50 mph (80 km/h). In the state, Carolina Beach and Wrightsville Beach observed sustained winds of 45 mph (72 km/h) and gusts of 50–60 mph (80–97 km/h). In the Wilmington area, winds damaged plate-glass windows and caused brief disruptions to electricity and communication services. Further inland, heavy rainfall, including 7.84 in (199 mm) in less than 24 hours in Manteo, resulted in considerable loss to crops, with 15%-20% damaged in some areas. That was the heaviest 24-hour precipitation total recorded in Manteo since observations began in 1905.

The storm moved northeastward and reemerged into the Atlantic Ocean near the southern end of Bodie Island early on July 7. Shortly thereafter, the cyclone began strengthening and became a Category 1 hurricane by 12:00 UTC. After slightly further intensification, the hurricane reached peak intensity at 18:00 UTC on July 7 with maximum sustained winds of 80 mph (130 km/h). It then curved eastward and began losing tropical characteristics. At 00:00 UTC on July 9, the hurricane transitioned into an extratropical cyclone while located about 390 mi (630 km) south-southeast of Cape Sable Island, Nova Scotia. The extratropical remnants gradually curved northeastward and then north-northeastward while slowly weakening. Late on July 10, the extratropical storm dissipated near Cape Race, Newfoundland.

=== Tropical Storm Three ===
- Tropical storm (SSHWS)
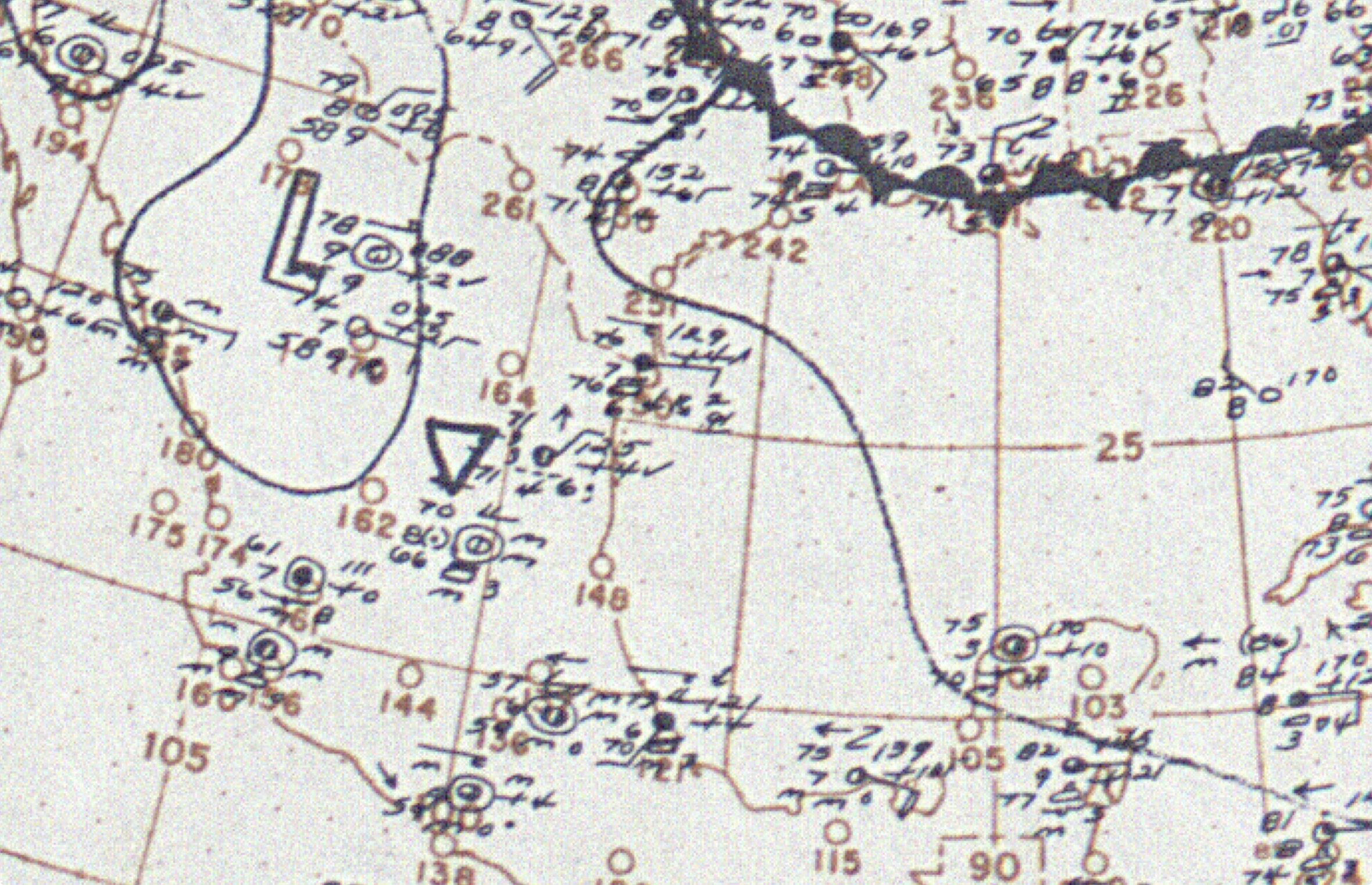
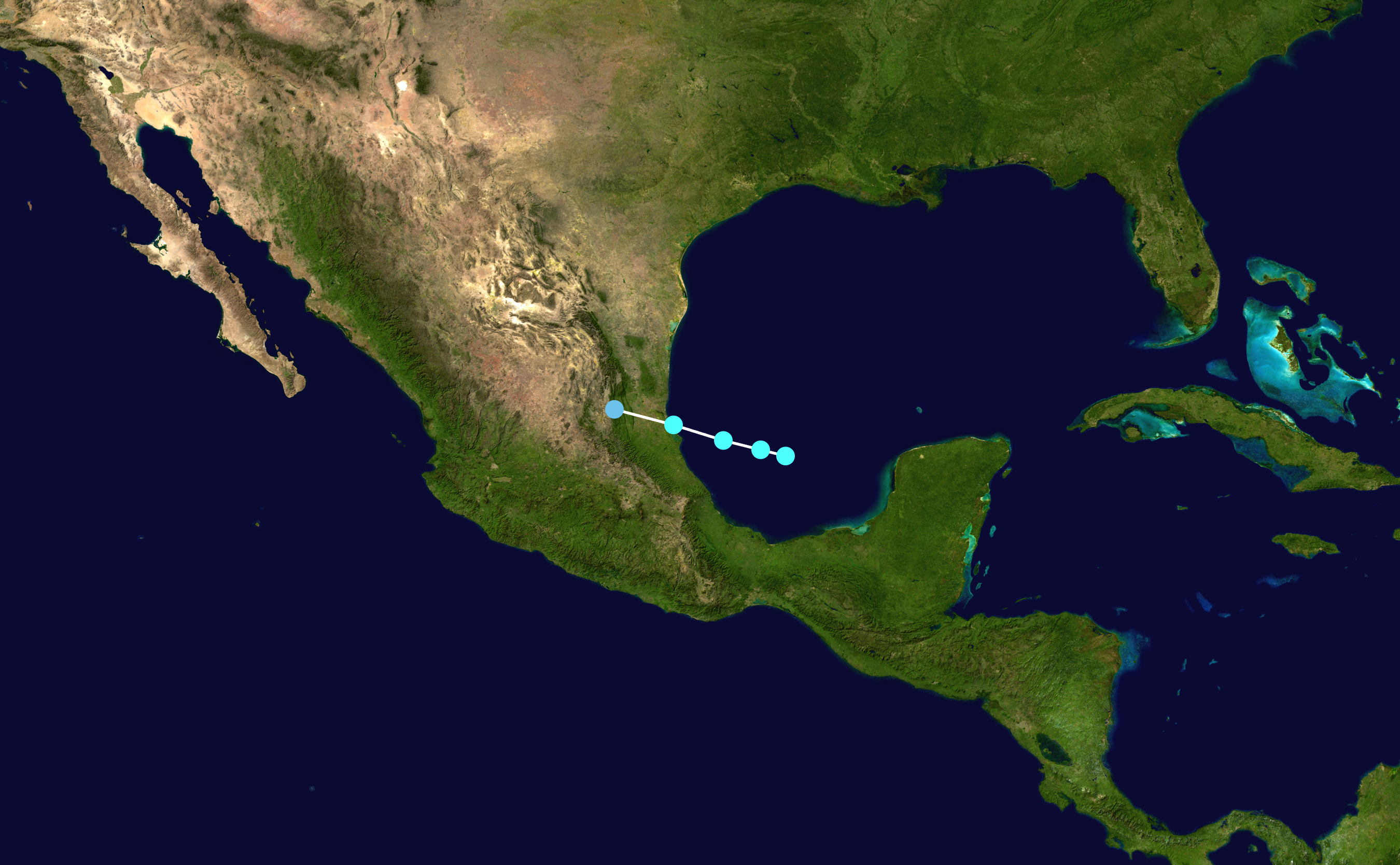
- Duration: August 25 – August 26
- Peak intensity: 40 mph (65 km/h) (1-min);

In late August, a disturbance was monitored moving over the western Caribbean Sea near Great Swan Island. Despite favorable conditions, further development did not occur until after it reached the Bay of Campeche. Early on August 25, it is estimated that a tropical storm developed after a reconnaissance aircraft flight reported that the system acquired a well-defined circulation. Peaking with maximum sustained winds of 40 mph (64 km/h), the storm moved quickly west-northwestward and made near Tampico, Tamaulipas, at 19:00 UTC. By early the next day, the cyclone weakened to a tropical depression and dissipated. A wind gust of 60 mph (97 km/h) was observed in Tampico.

=== Tropical depression ===
A tropical wave over the western Caribbean Sea developed into a tropical depression about 40 mi (64 km) north of the Swan Islands on September 9. However, by the following day, historical weather maps no longer indicated its existence. It is uncertain whether the system dissipated or made landfall in Central America.

=== Hurricane Four ===
- Category 2 hurricane (SSHWS)
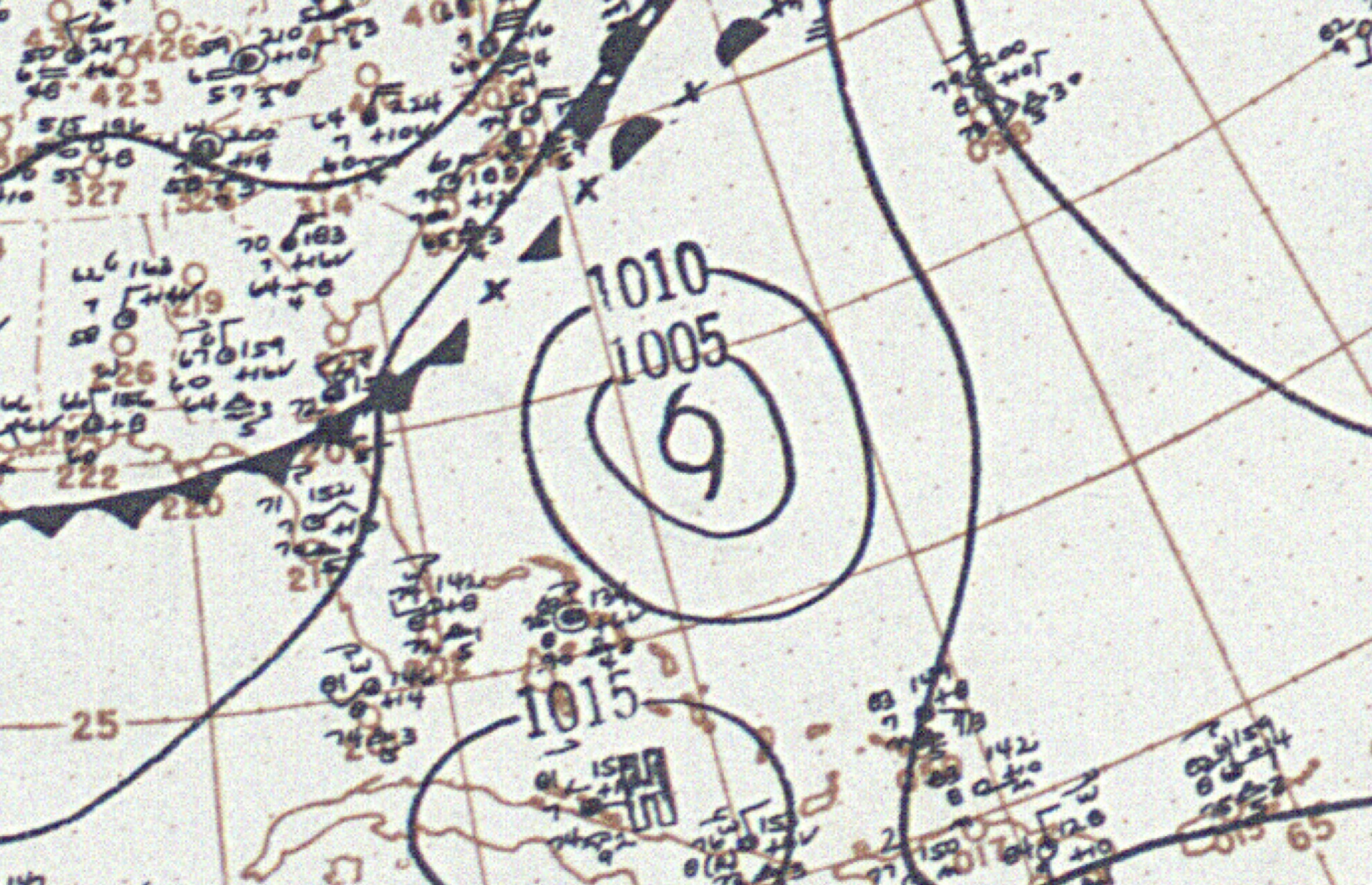
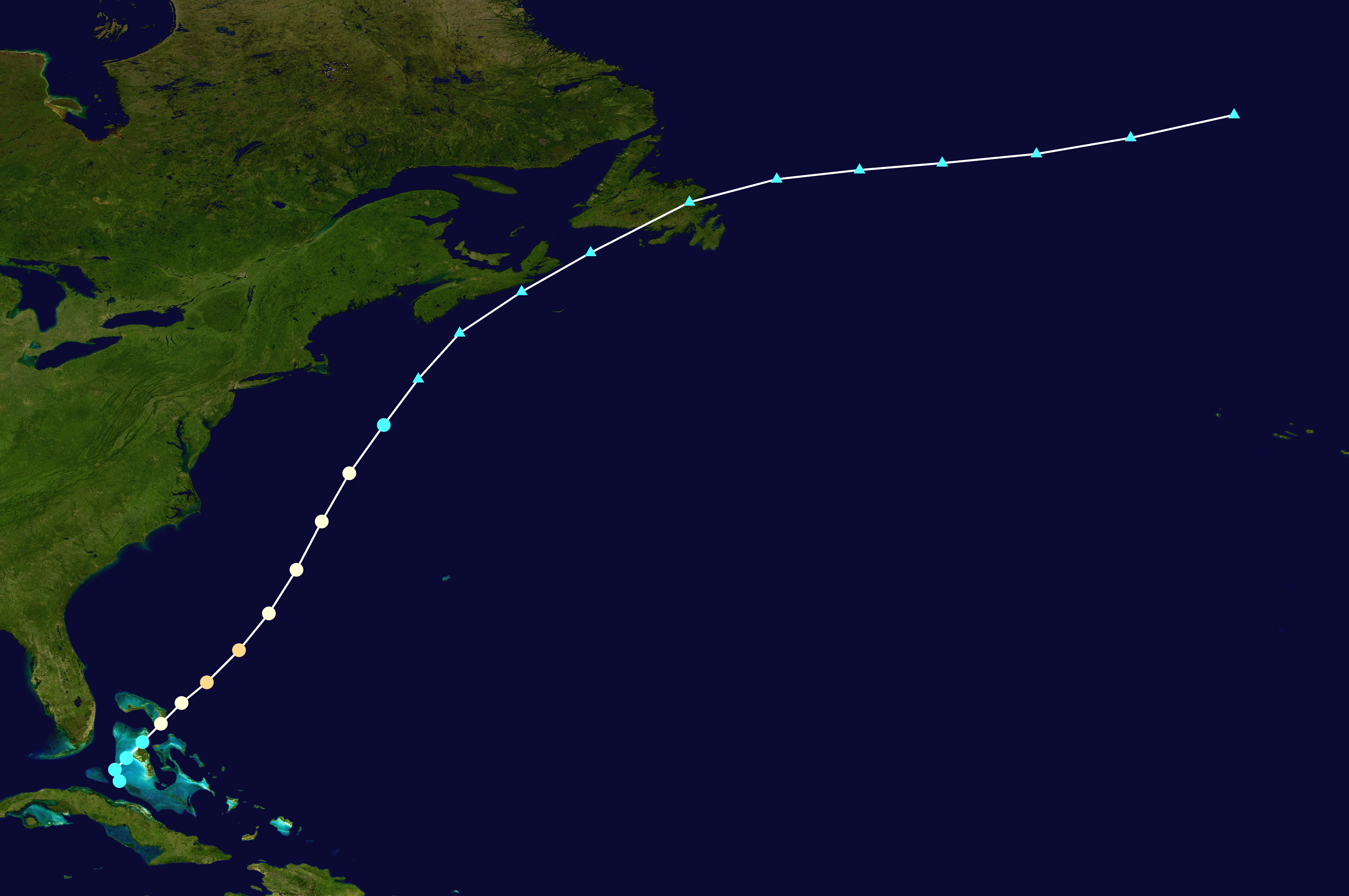
- Duration: September 12 – September 15
- Peak intensity: 100 mph (155 km/h) (1-min); 975 mbar (hPa)

Early on September 12, the northern portion of a tropical wave spawned a tropical storm about 75 mi (121 km) east Andros Island. The storm strengthened while moving northeastward into the northern Bahamas, striking Andros Island later that day with winds of 65 mph (105 km/h). Late on September 12, the cyclone strengthened into a hurricane before making landfall on South Abaco with winds of 75 mph (121 km/h). The hurricane intensified further after entering the open Atlantic, becoming on September 13. Shortly thereafter, it peaked with maximum sustained winds of 100 mph (160 km/h) and a minimum barometric pressure of 975 mbar (28.8 inHg), both of which were observed during a reconnaissance aircraft flight. The storm accelerated and weakened due to cooler sea surface temperatures, falling to tropical storm status early on September 15. Shortly thereafter, the cyclone became extratropical about 170 mi (270 km) south of Cape Sable Island. The extratropical remnants moved across Newfoundland and the northern Atlantic, until dissipating well north of the Azores on September 17.

In the Bahamas, Hope Town observed sustained winds of 65 mph (105 km/h) and stronger gusts, as well as a barometric pressure of 995 mbar (29.4 inHg). The Norwegian tanker Maril II sank after splitting in two, drowning sixteen people. However, because the Maril II was over 300 mi (480 km) away from the storm at the time, the incident could not be directly attributed to the hurricane. Some areas of Nova Scotia experienced strong winds, with sustained winds up to 60 mph (97 km/h) observed throughout the province and a gust of 71 mph (114 km/h) recorded at Sable Island. Heavy rain was also reported, with 2.9 in (74 mm) measured in Halifax. High seas during the Royal Nova Scotia Yacht Squadron race "The Hood Cup" forced the yachts to return to port.

=== Tropical Storm Five ===
- Tropical storm (SSHWS)
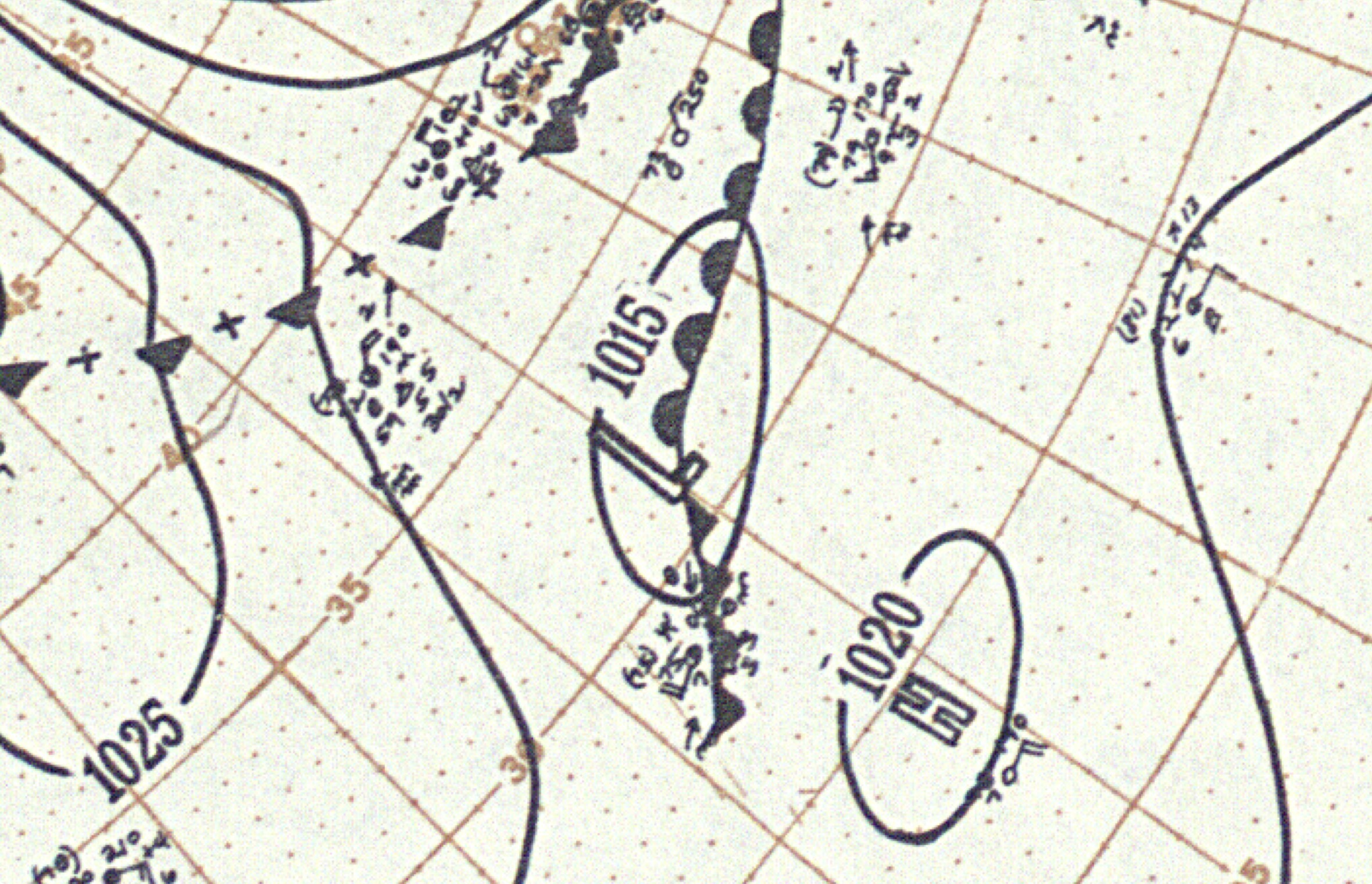
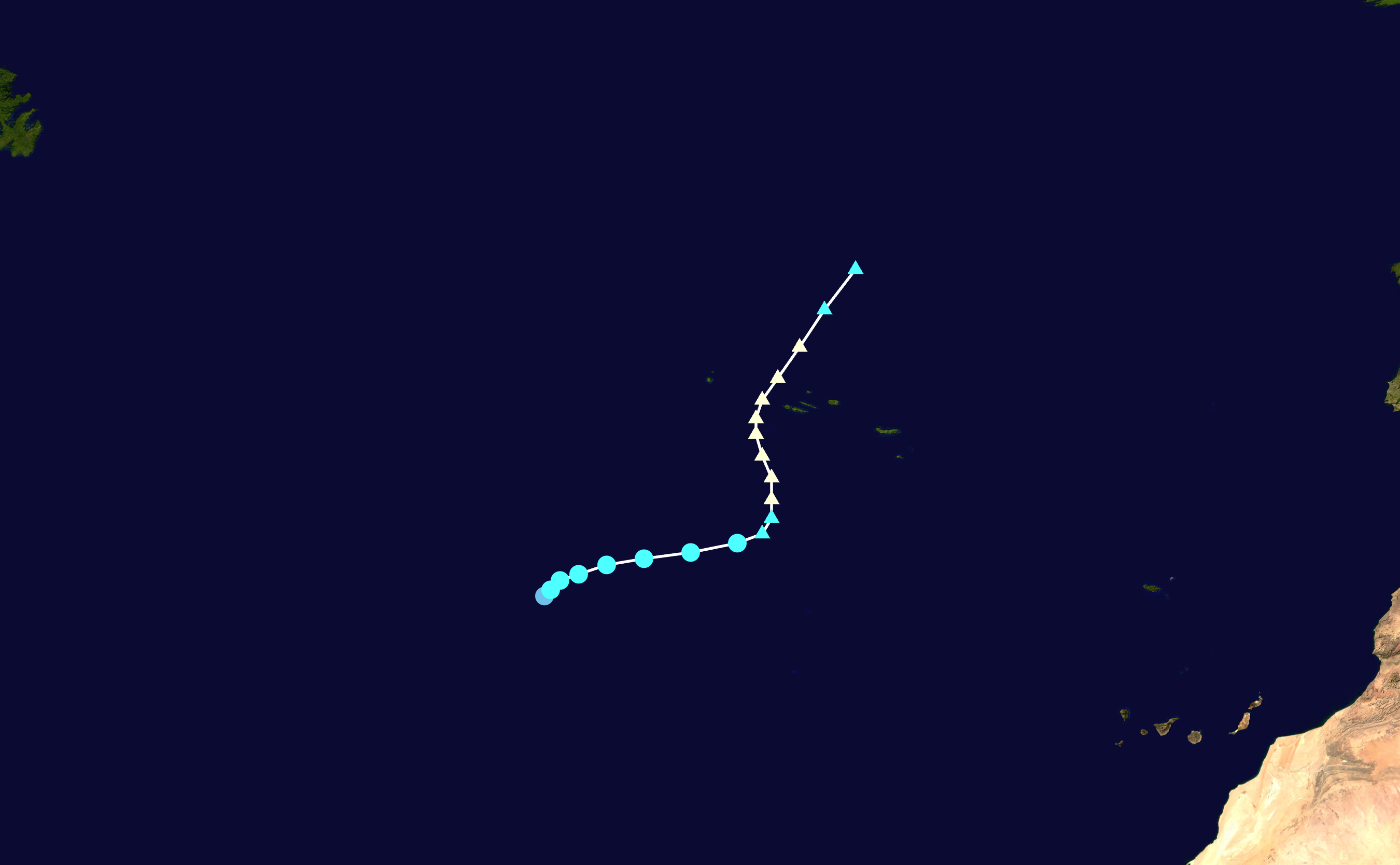
- Duration: October 1 – October 3
- Peak intensity: 60 mph (95 km/h) (1-min); ≤1004 mbar (hPa)

A low pressure area initially associated with two frontal systems developed into a tropical depression about 560 mi (900 km) southwest of Flores Island in the Azores at 12:00 UTC on October 1. After six hours, the depression intensified into a tropical storm. It intensified further while moving east-northeastward. On October 2, the system peaked with maximum sustained winds of 60 mph (97 km/h) and a minimum barometric pressure of 1,004 mbar (29.6 inHg), both of which were observed by ships. The storm then began losing tropical characteristics and merged with a frontal boundary around 12:00 UTC on October 3 while situated about 275 mi (443 km) south-southwest of Pico Island in the Azores. This storm was not included in HURDAT until 2014.

Although the system became extratropical, it continued to deepen further, with sustained winds reaching 90 mph (140 km/h) late on October 4. Additionally, it expanded significantly in size, reaching a diameter of about 1,035 mi (1,666 km) on October 5. Around that time, the storm passed through the Azores near Faial Island, before weakening and dissipating north of the island chain on October 6. Rough seas at Santa Maria Island left 120 fishermen missing, while 12 fishing vessels, 2 tugboats, and several launches were destroyed. Four fishing boats were also missing. Strong wind gusts up to 98 mph (158 km/h) caused "catastrophic" damage on Santa Maria and São Miguel islands. Homes, crops, and pineapple greenhouses were demolished, while communications were knocked out. Additionally, Lajes Field on Terceira Island was "practically destroyed".

=== Hurricane Six ===
- Category 2 hurricane (SSHWS)
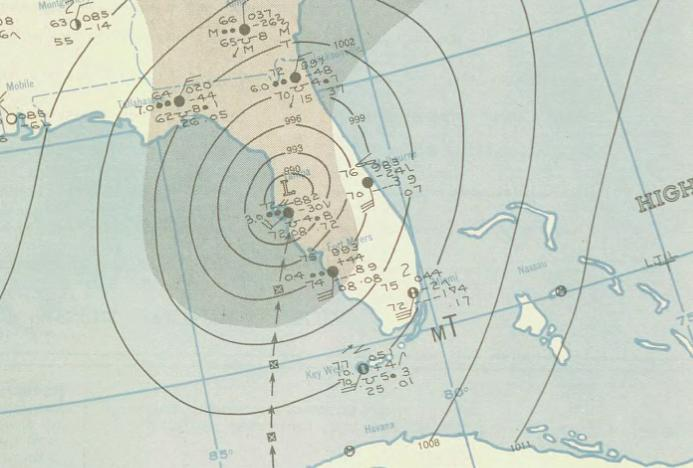
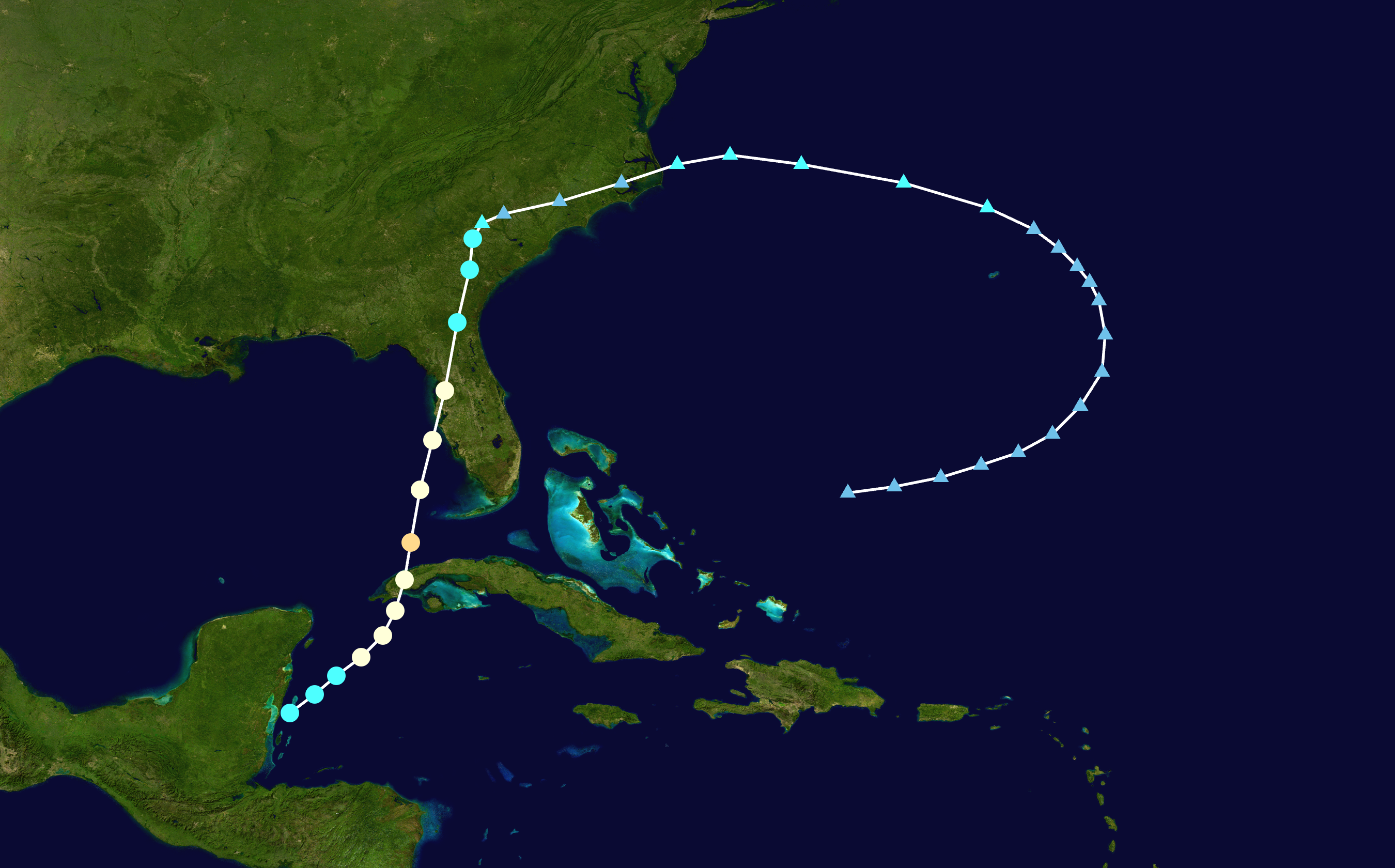
- Duration: October 5 – October 9
- Peak intensity: 100 mph (155 km/h) (1-min); ≤977 mbar (hPa)

A disturbance from the Intertropical Convergence Zone developed into a tropical storm late on October 5, while located over the western Caribbean Sea near the Belize–Mexico border. It moved northeastward and strengthened, reaching Category 1 hurricane status the next day. At 04:00 UTC on October 7, the storm made landfall in western Cuba near Boca de Galafre, Pinar del Río Province, with winds of 80 mph (130 km/h). A barometric pressure of 977 mbar (28.9 inHg) was observed, the lowest in relation to the system. Additionally, a station recorded a wind gust of 112 mph (180 km/h). Several sugar cane fields were flattened, with millions of tons of the crop destroyed. In many towns, telephone and telegraphic communications were cut off. Five deaths occurred in Cuba. After emerging into the Gulf of Mexico on October 7, the storm curved north-northeastward and strengthened to a Category 2, peaking with maximum sustained winds of 100 mph (160 km/h).

After becoming a Category 2 hurricane on October 7, the cyclone weakened to a Category 1 just six hours later. Around 04:00 UTC on the following day, it made another landfall near Bradenton Beach, Florida, with winds of 85 mph (137 km/h). In Florida, the gusty winds and rainfall produced by the storm inflicted damage mostly on crops. About 2% of the state's total citrus crop was lost, with damage totaling $5 million. Only about $200,000 in property damage occurred, which was mostly due to coastal flooding in cities such as Everglades, Fort Myers, and Punta Gorda. Moving inland, the hurricane weakened to a tropical storm later on October 8. Early on October 9, the system became extratropical over South Carolina. However, the extratropical remnants persisted for several days, moving in a semicircular path over the eastern Atlantic until dissipating well north of Hispaniola on October 14.

=== Tropical Storm Seven ===
- Tropical storm (SSHWS)
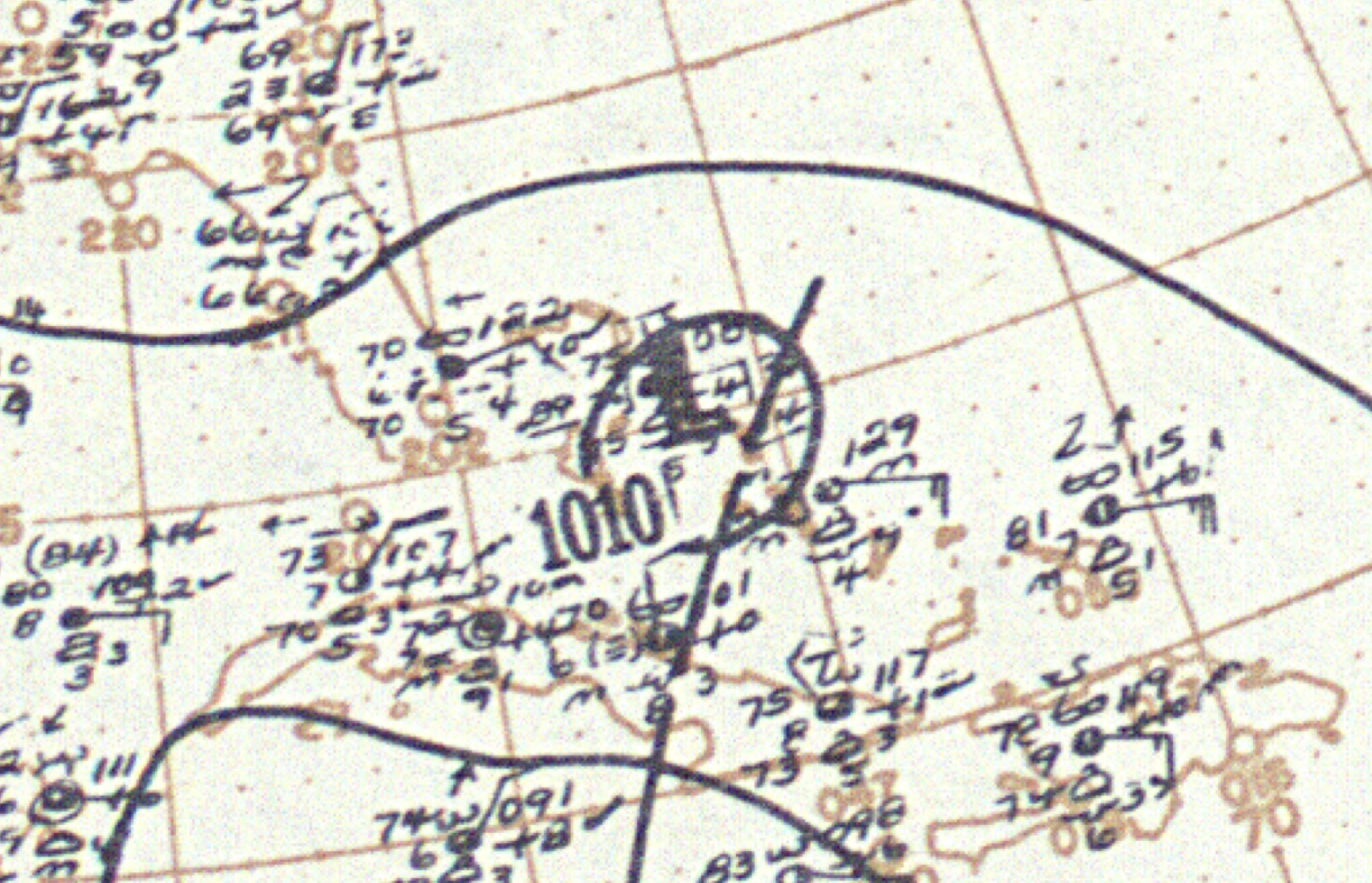
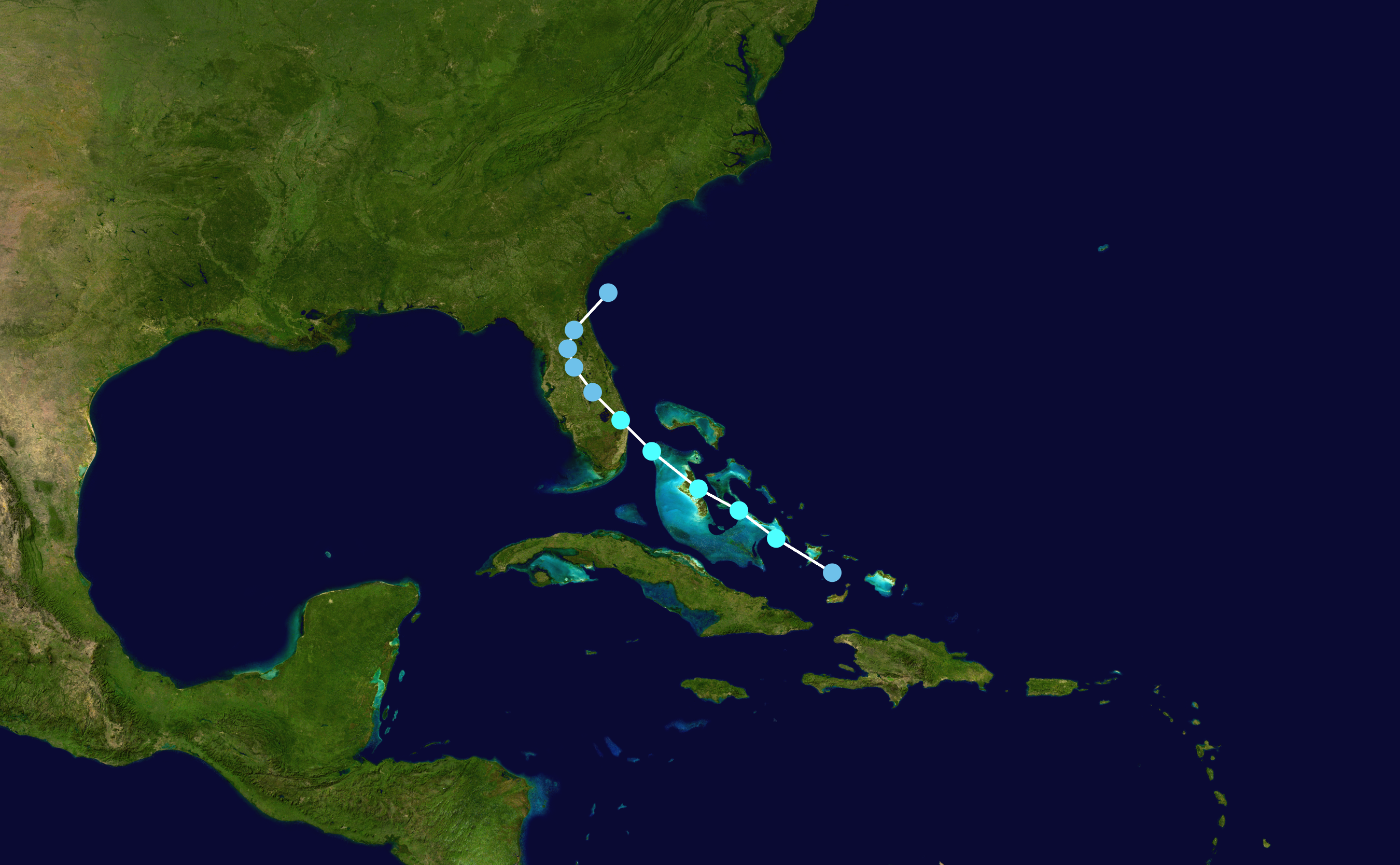
- Duration: October 31 – November 3
- Peak intensity: 45 mph (75 km/h) (1-min); 1002 mbar (hPa)

A tropical wave developed into a tropical depression late on October 31 over the Bahamas about halfway between Acklins and Little Inagua. The depression strengthened into a tropical storm early on November 1 and moved northwestward, striking several islands, including Acklins, Long Island, Exuma, and Andros. Late on November 1, the storm peaked with maximum sustained winds of 45 mph (72 km/h) and a minimum barometric pressure of 1,002 mbar (29.6 inHg). The system then made landfall near Lake Worth, Florida, at the same intensity around 22:00 UTC. Early on November 2, the storm weakened to a tropical depression and recurved northeastward over Central Florida. Shortly after reemerging into the Atlantic Ocean near Ponte Vedra Beach early on November 3, the depression dissipated about 45 mi (72 km) east-northeast of Fernandina Beach.

Due to the weak nature of the storm, no wind damage occurred. However, flooding occurred around Lake Okeechobee due to rainfall reaching 6 in (150 mm). Along main highways, several cars stalled, while a number of canals overflowed. Between 50%-70% of early fall crops in the area were damaged, with as much as 60% of snap bean crops lost. Damage was in the several millions range.

== Season effects ==
Saffir–Simpson scale
TD	TS	C1	C2	C3	C4	C5

1946 North Atlantic tropical cyclone season statistics
Storm name	Dates active	Storm category at peak intensity	Max 1-min wind mph (km/h)	Min. press. (mbar)	Areas affected	Damage (US$)	Deaths	Ref(s).
One	June 13 – 17	Tropical storm	40 (65)	N/A	Texas, Louisiana	None	0	
Two	July 5 – 9	Category 1 hurricane	80 (130)	N/A	North Carolina	Minor	0	
Three	August 25 – 26	Tropical storm	40 (65)	N/A	Mexico	None	0	
Depression	September 9	Tropical depression	N/A	N/A	Central America	None	0	
Four	September 12 – 15	Category 2 hurricane	100 (155)	975	The Bahamas, Nova Scotia, Newfoundland	None	0	
Five	October 1 – 3	Tropical storm	60 (95)	N/A	Azores	None	0	
Six	October 5 – 9	Category 2 hurricane	100 (155)	977	Cuba, Florida, Southeast United States	$5.2 million	5	
Seven	October 31 – November 3	Tropical storm	45 (75)	1002	Florida	Moderate	0	
Season aggregates
8 systems	June 13 – November 3		100 (155)	975		$5.2 million	5	

== See also ==
- Weather of 1946
- 1946 Pacific hurricane season
- 1946 Pacific typhoon season
- 1900–1950 South-West Indian Ocean cyclone seasons
- 1940s Australian region cyclone seasons
- 1940s South Pacific cyclone seasons
