= Racekiela =

Scientific classification
- Kingdom: Animalia
- Phylum: Porifera
- Class: Demospongiae
- Order: Spongillida
- Family: Spongillidae
- Genus: Racekiela; Bass & Volkmer-Ribeiro, 1998

Synonyms
- Acanthodiscus sensu Volkmer-Ribeiro, 1996

Genus of sponges

Racekiela is a genus of freshwater sponges in the family Spongillidae.

Racekiella cavernicola was discovered in 2010 and is the first freshwater cave-dwelling sponge in Brazil, in the state of Rio Grande do Norte.

== Species ==
- Racekiela andina Hernandez & Barreat, 2017
- Racekiela biceps (Lindenschmidt, 1950)
- Racekiela cavernicola Volkmer-Ribeiro, Bichuette & de Sousa Machado, 2010
- Racekiela montemflumina Carballo, Cruz-Barraza, Yanez & Gomez, 2018
- Racekiela pictouensis (Potts, 1885)
- Racekiela ryderi (Potts, 1882)
- Racekiela sheilae (Volkmer-Ribeiro, de Rosa-Barbosa & Marques-Tavares, 1988)
