= USS Manhasset =

Patrol vessel of the United States Navy

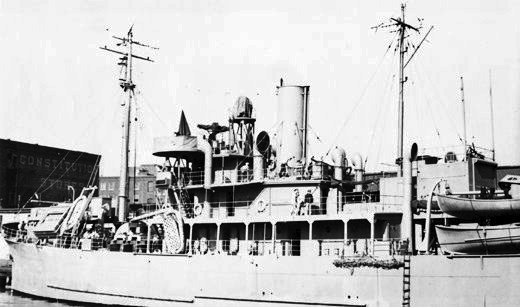

History

United States
- Name: USS Manhasset
- Namesake: an inlet of Long Island Sound on the coast of Long Island, New York
- Builder: Bethlehem Shipbuilding Corporation, Sparrows Point, Maryland
- Laid down: date unknown
- Completed: in 1923 as the cargo ship SS Wilton
- Acquired: by the Navy in 1941
- Commissioned: 8 August 1942 as USS Manhasset (AG-47)
- Decommissioned: 22 October 1943
- In service: 22 October 1943 as USCGC Manhasset (WIX-276)
- Out of service: 15 October 1945
- Renamed: Manhasset (YAG-8), 2 January 1942
- Reclassified: AG-47, 30 May 1942
- Refit: Sullivan Drydock and Repair Corp., Brooklyn, New York
- Stricken: 30 October 1943
- Fate: Sold by the U.S. Coast Guard, 16 October 1946

General characteristics
- Type: commercial cargo ship
- Displacement: 3,000 tons
- Length: 245 ft (75 m)
- Beam: 40 ft (12 m)
- Draft: 16 ft 8 in (5.08 m)
- Propulsion: one Hooven, Owens, Rentschler Company triple-expansion steam engine; two Bethlehem Shipbuilding Corp. single-ended Scotch boilers; 190 psi; single propeller, 300 SHP
- Speed: 11.5 knots
- Complement: 150 officers and enlisted
- Armament: two single 4 in (100 mm) gun mounts; four single 20 mm AA gun mounts; four depth charge projectors

USS Manhasset (AG-47/YAG-8) – later known as USCGC Manhasset (WIX-276) – was a commercial cargo ship leased by the U.S. Navy during World War II. She was armed with guns and depth charges and was used as a weather patrol ship, a convoy escort, and as a patrol craft. She experienced action in the dangerous North Atlantic Ocean, but returned home safely after war's end.

== Constructed in Maryland ==
Manhasset (AG 47) was built by Bethlehem Shipbuilding Corporation, Sparrows Point, Maryland, in 1923 as merchantman Wilton; acquired by the U.S. Maritime Commission from her owner, Eastern Steamship Lines, Inc., in 1941; transferred under time charter to the Navy 2 January 1942; renamed Manhasset and reclassified from YAG-8 to AG-47 on 30 May 1942; converted for use as a weather patrol ship by Sullivan Drydock and Repair Corp., Brooklyn, New York; and loaned to the U.S. Coast Guard being commissioned on 8 August 1942.

== World War II operations ==
Equipped with specialized meteorological instruments, Manhasset joined the weather patrol in the North Atlantic Ocean to gather vital weather information used in compiling forecasts for Allied European operations against the Axis. She braved the dangers of stormy seas and the menace of German U-boats while operating her assigned and isolated patrol areas out of Argentia, Newfoundland, and Boston, Massachusetts. She averaged about one patrol a month, usually about three weeks long.

Manhasset also patrolled and searched for German submarines. While cruising midway between Flemish Cap and Cape Farewell, Greenland, she depth charged a suspected U-boat, with no positive results, 27 April 1943. The following week convoy ONS 5 (Outbound from Liverpool to Nova Scotia, Slow) steamed through her patrol station, and on 5 May she provided support during one of the largest convoy battles of World War II, the convoy included 43 merchant vessels, 7 escorts, 2 trawlers, and a fuel ship and was joined by other Allied ships as the battle progressed. Attacking them were members of three Wolfpacks, Specht, Meisel, and Amsel, including 58 U-boats.

The battle raged between late 4 May and early 6 May. Although the convoy lost 13 ships, the escorts sank five U-boats and repulsed the remainder. Occurring in "Black May," the month marking the dramatic decline in the U-boat effectiveness in WWII, when Allied efforts repulsed or sank most opposition, the Battle with ONS 5 was the final wolfpack attack against the northern merchant trade routes in the Battle of the North Atlantic.

As Manhasset patrolled near the British merchant ship Dolius, torpedoed and abandoned earlier in the day but still afloat, she made sound contact with a submarine late in the afternoon. She made six vigorous depth charge attacks and sighted first a periscope wake followed by an oil slick. However, she sighted no wreckage and broke off attack to guard the torpedoed ship after more than 2 hours of searching.

=== Transferred to the Coast Guard ===
Manhasset contained her weather station patrols during the rest of the war. The Navy transferred her to the U.S. Coast Guard 22 October 1943, and her name was struck from the Navy List 30 October 1943.

== Post-war dispositioning ==
On 15 October 1945 she was decommissioned by the Coast Guard, and, on 16 October 1946, she was sold. Entered merchant service as Manahasset (Cia de Navigacion Maritima Cassipio SA, Panama), 1946. Wrecked without any loss of life on Sable Island, Nova Scotia, 4 July 1947, she was the last major shipwreck on the island.
