= Sable Aviation =

Canadian charter airline

Sable Aviation 44 60 Inc
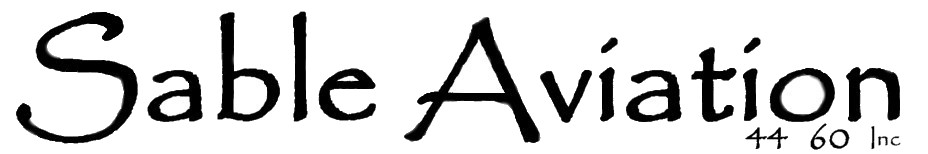

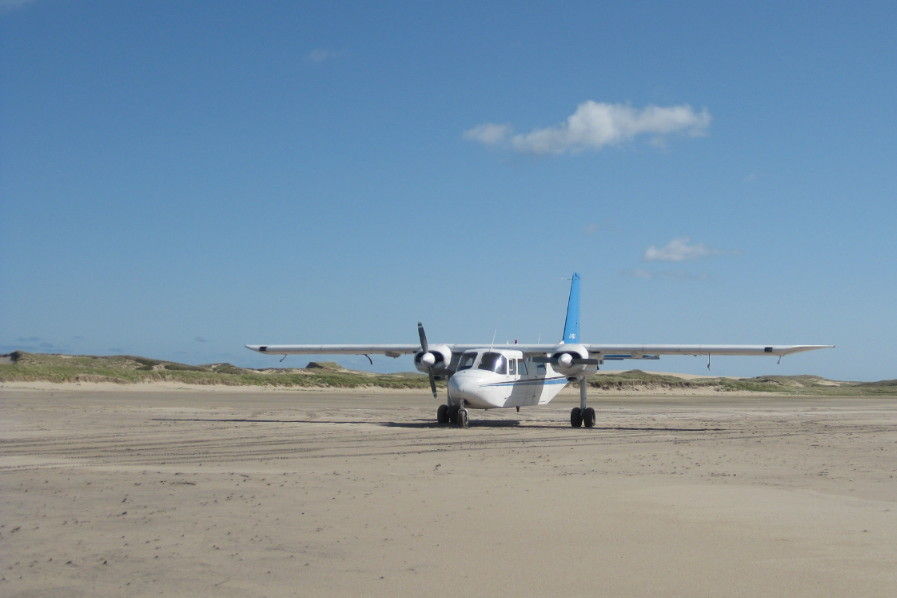
- The Britten-Norman Islander at Sable Island Aerodrome
- Founded: 2016
- AOC #: 18430
- Hubs: Halifax Stanfield International Airport
- Focus cities: Sable Island
- Fleet size: 1
- Destinations: Sable Island Aerodrome, Halifax Stanfield International Airport
- Headquarters: Halifax Stanfield International Airport, Nova Scotia
- Website: http://www.sableaviation.ca

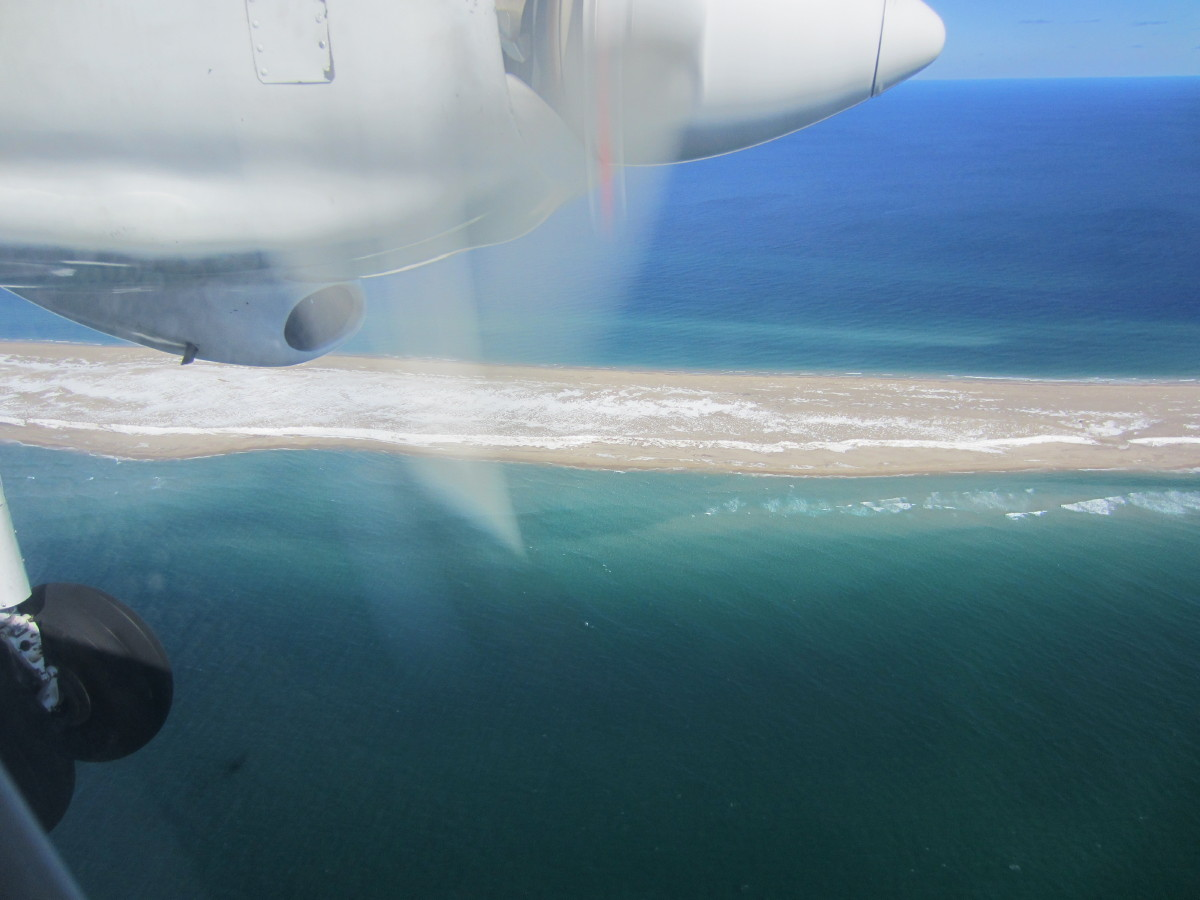
Aerial shot of snowy Sable Island taken by Sable Aviation pilot

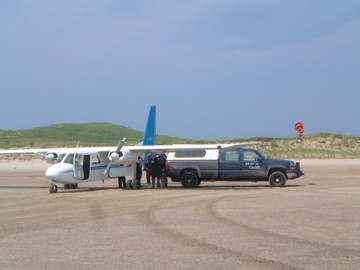
Islander being unloaded on the beach at Sable Island

Sable Aviation (legal name Sable Aviation 44 60 Incorporated) is an on-demand aircraft charter company operating from the Gateway Facilities hangar/FBO at the Halifax Stanfield International Airport whose primary role is to provide fixed wing service to Sable Island.

Sable Aviation began operations in June 2016, although the same aircraft and pilot had been flying to Sable Island since 2006 with another locally based company. Sable Aviation operates a Britten-Norman BN-2A-21 Islander, with an oversize tire modification that allows it to land safely on the sandy south beach of Sable. The flights run year-round on an as-needed basis, providing support to the Sable Island Station by bringing out supplies, station personnel, researchers, contractors, etc. Sable Aviation also flies out tourist groups who are interested in visiting the Sable Island National Park Reserve.

== See also ==
- Sable Island Aerodrome
