= Lasioglossum sablense =

Scientific classification
- Domain: Eukaryota
- Kingdom: Animalia
- Phylum: Arthropoda
- Class: Insecta
- Order: Hymenoptera
- Family: Halictidae
- Tribe: Halictini
- Genus: Lasioglossum
- Species: L. sablense

Binomial name
- Lasioglossum sablense Gibbs 2010

Species of bee

Lasioglossum sablense, commonly known as the Sable Island sweat bee, is a species of sweat bee in the genus Lasioglossum endemic to Sable Island, off the coast of Nova Scotia, Canada. The species was first described in 2010, and is one of only five bees known to occur on the island (located approximately 150 km off Nova Scotia's mainland). The Sable Island sweat bee is one of two species of sweat bee known from the island, the other being the Nova Scotia sweat bee (Lasioglossum novaescotiae), which is also known to occur on the eastern Canadian mainland. Potential foraging and nesting habitat for Sable Island sweat bee is limited to the vegetated portions of Sable Island, which cover about 39% of the island's surface area (or 13-15 square kilometres). The Sable Island sweat bee is a ground-nesting species and a generalist forager of the island's floral resources (including Hieracium, Vaccinium, Rosa, and Achillea).
