= Racekiela ryderi =

Scientific classification
- Kingdom: Animalia
- Phylum: Porifera
- Class: Demospongiae
- Order: Spongillida
- Family: Spongillidae
- Genus: Racekiela
- Species: R. ryderi

Binomial name
- Racekiela ryderi Potts 1882

Synonyms
- List: Acanthodiscus ryderii (Potts, 1882); Anheteromeyenia ryderii (Potts, 1882); Heteromeyenia conigera Old, 1931; Heteromeyenia macouni A. H. Mackay; Heteromeyenia ryderii Potts, 1882

Species of sponge

Racekiela ryderi is a species of freshwater sponge in the family Spongillidae. It was first described by Edward Potts in 1882. It was collected on Sable Island in 1899 by John Macoun, a biologist with the Geological Survey of Canada, and given the name Heteromeyenia macouni by A.H. Mackay in 1900. It was originally assumed to be endemic to Sable island but is now considered to be the same species as Racekiela ryderi, which is more broadly distributed.
