= Sable Island Aerodrome =

Airport in Nova Scotia, Canada

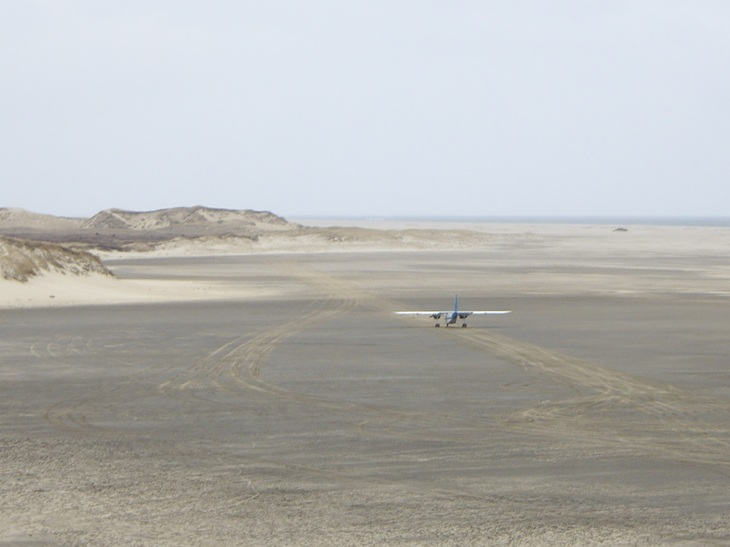
- Sable Aviation's Britten Norman Islander parked on the beach runway
- IATA: YSA; ICAO: none; TC LID: CSB2

Summary
- Airport type: Private
- Operator: Parks Canada
- Location: Sable Island, Nova Scotia
- Time zone: AST (UTC−04:00)
  - Summer (DST): ADT (UTC−03:00)
- Elevation AMSL: 4 ft (1.2 m)
- Coordinates: 43°55′46″N 059°57′35″W

Map
- Location in Canada

Runways
| Direction | Length | | Surface |
| Direction | ft | m | Surface |
|---|---|---|---|
| 11/29 | 1,500 | 457 | Sand |
- Source: Canada Flight Supplement

Sable Island Aerodrome, (IATA: YSA, TC LID: CSB2), is located on Sable Island, Nova Scotia, Canada. The term aerodrome is somewhat of a misnomer since there is no actual airport infrastructure nor is there a runway on Sable Island. The designated landing area is the hard sand of the island's south beach. It has been registered as an aerodrome (and therefore has an entry as such in the Canada Flight Supplement) in order to facilitate approval of a GPS approach. Sable Aviation operates a Britten-Norman Islander with an oversize tire modification on regular flights to the beach from Halifax Stanfield International Airport; it is the contracted fixed wing service provider for Sable Island.

Prior permission is required to land at this aerodrome. Prior to allowing an aircraft to land, the Operations Coordinator of Parks Canada's Sable Island Station must thoroughly inspect the area in use that day. A Jeep is driven the length of the landing area, testing its firmness and marking out the "runway". It is then walked to confirm there are no soft spots, and inspected for debris. If the beach is too wet or too dry, it may be too soft to safely land the aircraft.

Although the south beach is not tidal, storm surges occasionally flood the entire landing area to a depth of more than a foot, rendering it unusable for fixed-wing operations.

== Sable Island Station helipad ==
With prior permission from Parks Canada, rotary aircraft (helicopters) can operate from the Sable Island Station helipad (TC LID: CST5).
