= Sable Island =

Island in Nova Scotia, Canada

Sable Island île de Sable
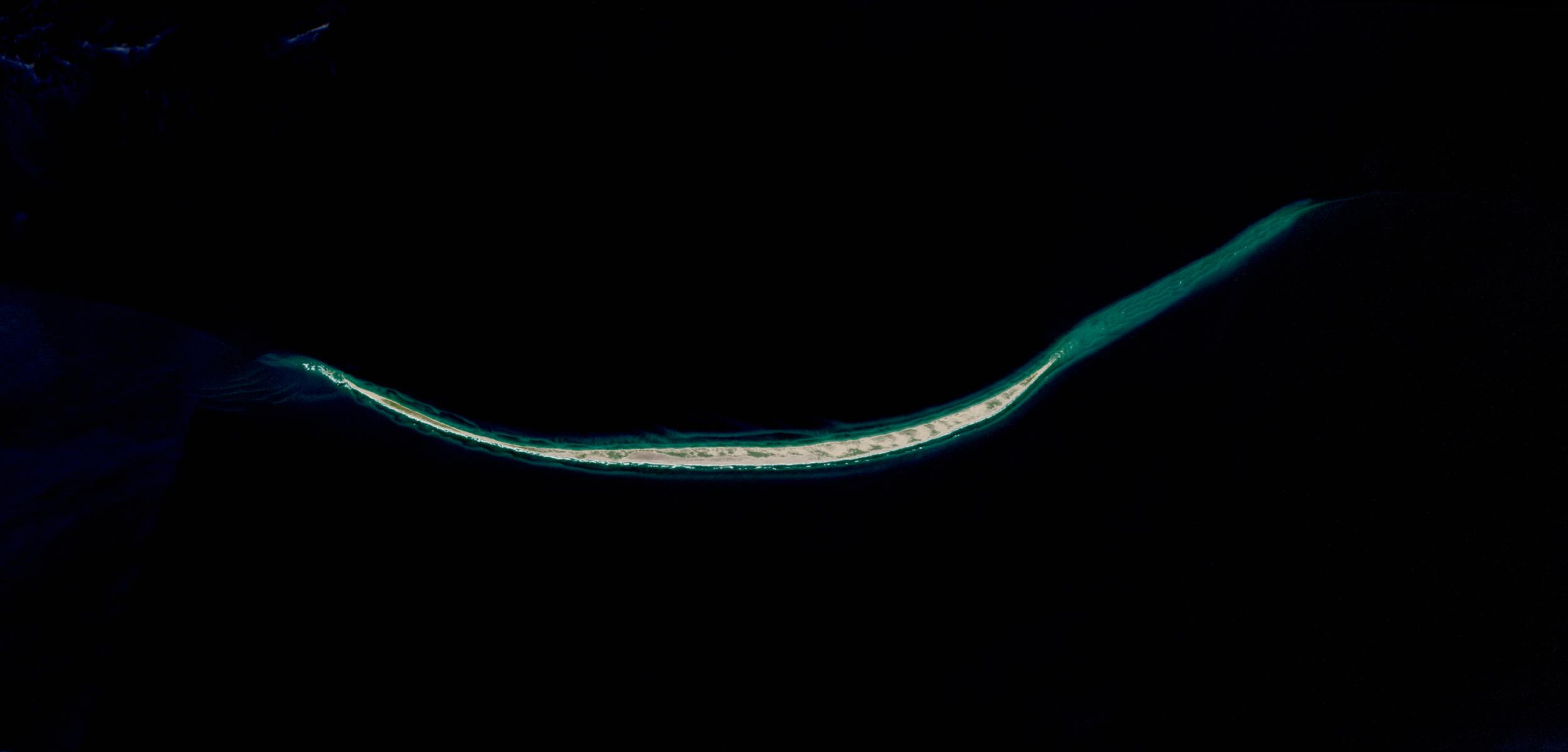
- Satellite view of Sable Island in July 2026

- Location within Canada Location within North Atlantic
- Coordinates: 43°55′51″N 59°55′04″W
- Country: Canada
- Province: Nova Scotia
- Municipality: Halifax Regional Municipality
- District: 13

Area
  - Land: 31 km^{2} (12 sq mi)
- Highest elevation: 30 m (98 ft)

Population
  - Total: 0 (Note: 6-25 personnel from Meteorological Service of Canada are stationed on Sable Island on rotation at Sable Island Station only)
  - Density: 0/km^{2} (0/sq mi)
- Time zone: UTC−04:00 (AST)
  - Summer (DST): UTC−03:00 (ADT)
- GNBC Code: CBRQR

Sable Island (French: île de Sable, literally "island of sand") is an island in the North Atlantic Ocean, about 300 kilometres (160 nmi) southeast of Halifax, Canada, and about 175 kilometres (95 nmi) southeast of the closest point of mainland Nova Scotia. The island is staffed year-round by employees of Canada's National Parks agency, Parks Canada. The number of people on Sable Island fluctuates throughout the year, rising during the summer months when the island is frequented by researchers and an increased staff complement. Notable for its role in early Canadian history and the Sable Island horse, the island is protected and managed by Parks Canada, which must grant permission prior to any visit. Sable Island is part of District 7 of the Halifax Regional Municipality in Nova Scotia. The island is also a protected National Park Reserve and an Important Bird Area.

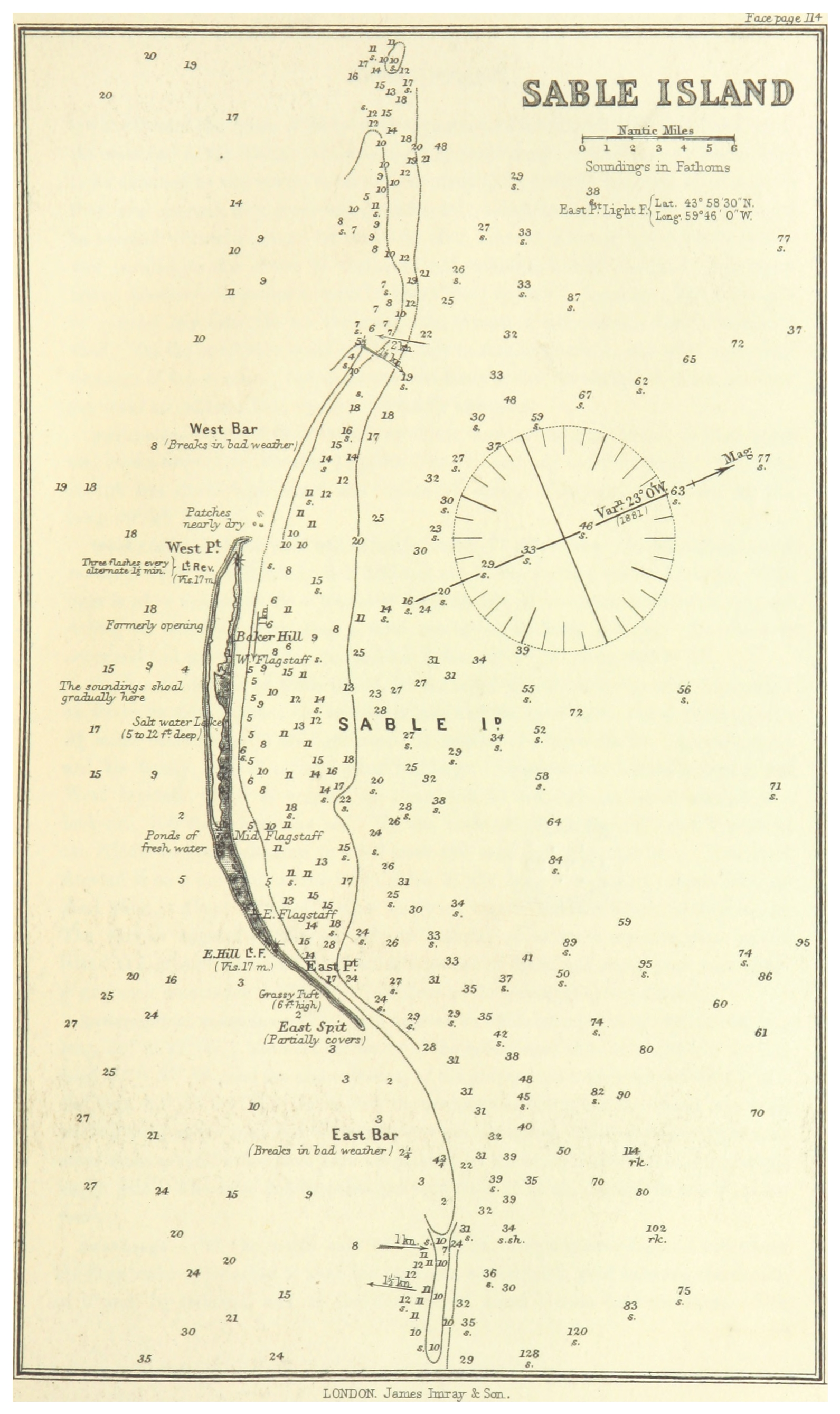
Nautical Chart, Atlantic Sea Pilot, 1884

== History ==
=== Early history ===
The expedition of Portuguese explorer João Álvares Fagundes explored this region in 1520–1521 and his expedition was among the first Europeans to encounter the island. It is likely that he named the island "Fagunda" after himself. An island called Fagunda appears on later Portuguese maps placed to the southeast of Cape Breton, fairly near its present location; the identification of Sable Island with Fagunda is not certain. On the other hand, 16th-century Portuguese sources describe a fishing colony founded by the navigator in Cape Breton Island, farther north. It is also possible that Fagundes sighted the island while heading southwest, reaching the Bay of Fundy, as the 1558 map of Diogo Homem and later Samuel de Champlain suggested, but this is unclear. The island was inhabited sporadically by sealers, shipwreck survivors, and salvagers known as "wreckers".

Troilus de La Roche de Mesgouez attempted to colonize the treeless and stoneless Sable Island with a group of convicts and soldiers in 1598. Most of the settlers died in a mutiny, but a few managed to survive in mud dwellings for five years before being returned to France in 1603.

=== Shipwrecks ===
Sable Island is famous for its large number of shipwrecks. An estimated 350 vessels are believed to have fallen victim to the island's sand bars. Thick fogs, treacherous currents, and the island's location in the middle of both a major transatlantic shipping route and rich fishing grounds account for the large number of wrecks.

The first recorded wreck was the English ship Delight in 1583, part of Humphrey Gilbert's expedition to Newfoundland.

There were at least three incidents of shipwrecks in the 1700s. In 1736, a well-known Presbyterian preacher, the Irish-born Reverend Robert Dunlap (1715–1776), wrecked on the island on his way to America. Decades later, there were two major shipwrecks: In November 1760, Major Robert Elliot (1715 – after 1765) of the 43rd regiment was shipwrecked on Sable Island; he was rescued in January 1761. En route to Prince Edward Island under the command of Major Timothy Hierlihy, Lieutenant Anthony Kennedy and 25 men wrecked on the island in November 1778. The crew was stranded on the island for the winter. Two died, and the remainder were rescued and transported to Halifax the following April.

In June 1801, the Quaker leader Seth Coleman was dispatched to Sable Island by Lt. Gov. John Wentworth, with the orders that "a man and woman of wicked character have been landed on the island for the infamous inhuman practice of plundering, robbing and causing shipwrecks - this man and his wife and all belongings you are to remove from the island at all events..."

In 1873, lighthouses were constructed at each end of the island; shipwrecks decreased afterward.

The last major shipwreck was the steamship USS Manhasset in 1947. Her crew were all saved, the last significant rescue of the Sable lifesaving station. After the 1991 Perfect Storm, the commercial fishing vessel Andrea Gail's emergency position-indicating radiobeacon (EPIRB) was discovered on the shore of Sable Island on November 6, 1991, nine days after the last transmission from the crew. Other items found were fuel drums, a fuel tank, an empty life raft, and some other flotsam. No crew members have been found, and all are presumed to have perished. No further wrecks occurred until 1999, when the three crew members of the yacht Merrimac survived after their sloop ran aground due to a navigational error. Few of the wrecks surrounding the island are visible, as they are usually crushed and buried by the sand. On July 12, 2024, the bodies of Briton Sarah Packwood and her Canadian husband Brett Clibbery were found in a lifeboat that washed up on Sable Island; they had left Nova Scotia June 11, 2024, on their sail yacht Theros trying to sail to the Azores and had been reported missing June 18, 2024.

=== The Nova Scotia Rescue Station ===
A series of life-saving stations were established on Sable Island by the governor of Nova Scotia, John Wentworth, in 1801. The rescue station began the continuous human presence on the island which continues today. Wentworth appointed James Morris, a Nova Scotian veteran of the British Royal Navy as the first superintendent of the island. Morris settled on the island in October 1801 with his family. By the time Morris died on the island in 1809, he had built up the humanitarian settlement to include a central station, two rescue boat stations, several lookout posts and survivor shelters. The station's rescue equipment was upgraded in 1854 with the latest generation of self-bailing lifeboats and life cars through the fundraising efforts of social reformer Dorothea Dix who had visited the island in the previous year.

=== After Confederation and creation of a weather station ===
The island became property of the federal government during Canadian Confederation in 1867, with the Island being specifically referenced in an appendix to the British North America Act. The federal government later added two lighthouses in 1872: Sable Island East End Light (cylindrical skeletal tower built 1980s, replacing earlier iterations from 1873, 1888, 1917 and 1951) on the eastern tip and Sable Island West End Light (pyramidal skeletal tower built 1979 replacing earlier towers from 1873, 1903 and 1935) on the western end. Until the advent of modern ship navigation, Sable Island was home to the families of the life-saving crews and the lighthouse keepers. In the early 20th century, the Marconi Company established a wireless station on the island and the Canadian government similarly established a weather station. Several generations of island staff were born and raised families of their own on the island, although a decline in shipwrecks gradually reduced the size of the lifesaving community. Only two people have been born on Sable Island since 1920.

Improvements in navigation led to a dramatic drop in shipwrecks by the mid 20th century. As such, the rescue station on Sable was reduced and eventually closed in 1958. The Canadian Coast Guard (CCG) first automated in the 1960s and eventually decommissioned the West light station in 2004 leaving only the East lighthouse active. During this period, the island's role in science grew, first in weather research. The Canadian government expanded the collection of weather data originally started by the rescue station into a full meteorological station operated by Environment and Climate Change Canada and Fisheries and Oceans Canada. The station conducted routine atmospheric and meteorological studies from a permanently occupied station on Sable Island until August 20, 2019. In addition to weather studies, research on the island expanded to a range of ecological and wildlife studies due to its position in the Atlantic.

Sable Island is specifically mentioned in the Constitution Act, 1867, formerly the British North America Act 1867, Part 4, Section 91 as being the special responsibility of the federal government ("the exclusive Legislative Authority of the Parliament of Canada extends to ... 9. Beacons, Buoys, Lighthouses, and Sable Island"). For this reason it is considered a separate amateur radio "entity" (equivalent to a country for award credit), and with visiting operations using the special call sign prefix CY0. Because it is a separate radio entity, Sable Island is a popular DX-pedition destination.

Out of concern for preserving the island's frail ecology, all visitors to the island, including recreational boaters, require specific permission from Parks Canada. Sable Island's heliport contains emergency aviation fuel for search and rescue helicopters, which use the island to stage further offshore into the Atlantic. When the Sable Offshore Energy Project was active, the island was designated as an emergency evacuation point for crews aboard nearby drilling rigs. In 2017, ExxonMobil began the plugging and abandonment of the production wells in the Thebaud field (the Sable Offshore Energy Project wells closest to Sable Island); all facilities were removed by November 2020.

=== National Park Reserve ===
Sable Island National Park Reserve
- IUCN category II (national park)
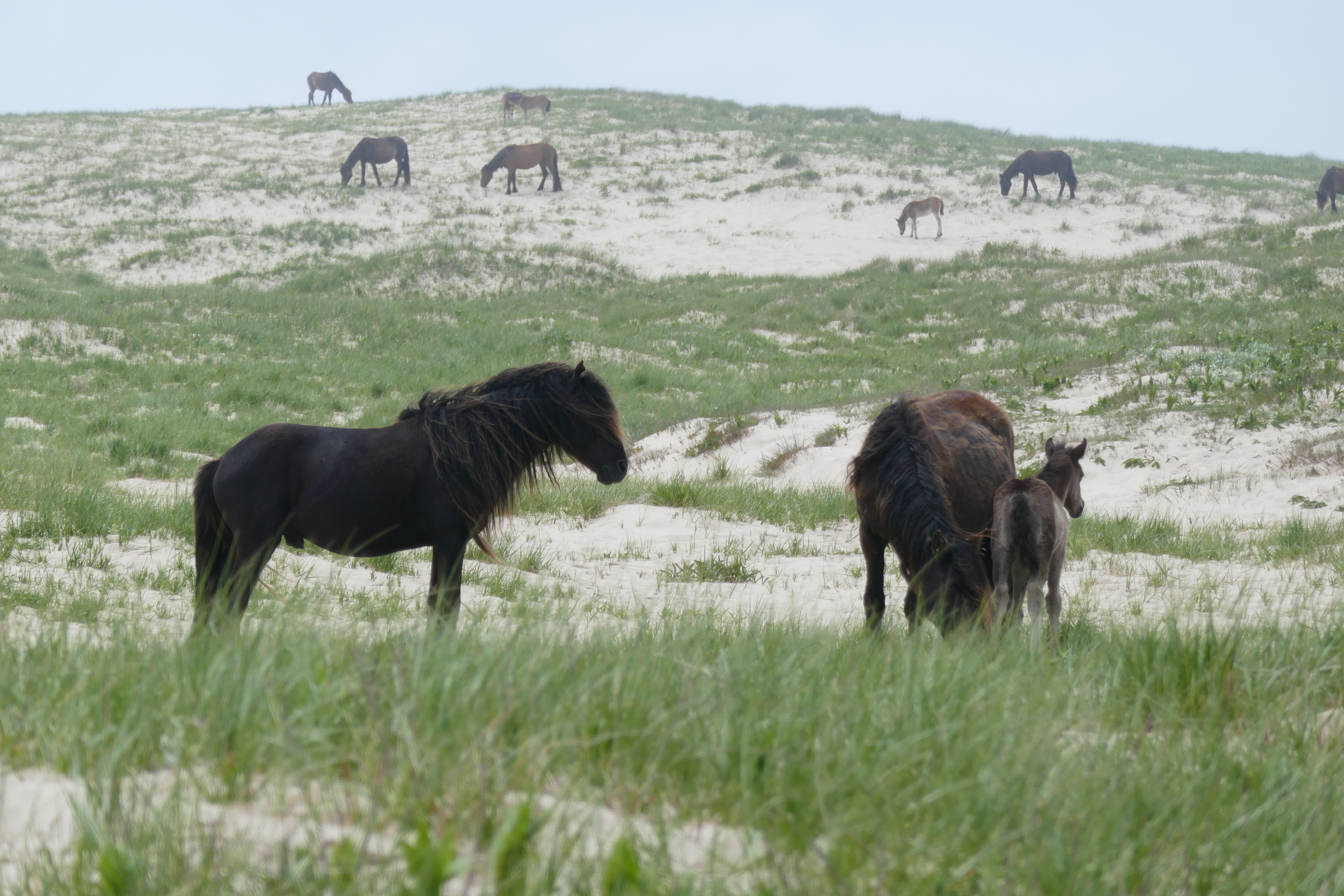
- Sable Island horses grazing
- Interactive map of Sable Island National Park Reserve
- Location: Halifax, Nova Scotia
- Nearest city: Halifax, Nova Scotia
- Coordinates: 43°57′00″N 59°54′57″W
- Area: 30 km^{2} (12 sq mi)
- Established: June 20, 2013
- Visitors: 806 (in 2022–23)
- Governing body: Parks Canada

On October 17, 2011, the Nova Scotia government entered into an agreement with the federal government to eventually protect the island as a national park. The news followed an announcement made by the federal government in May 2010, increasing the level of protection the island receives by transferring control from the Canadian Coast Guard to Parks Canada, which manages the island under the Canada National Parks Act. The establishment of the park reserve means that the island, and the surrounding area within one nautical mile (two kilometres), cannot be drilled for oil or natural gas.

Sable Island became a National Park Reserve on June 20, 2013, with approval of Mi'kmaq stakeholders. Full national park status has yet to be achieved, pending settlement of Indigenous land claims. The park is home to hundreds of species of flora and fauna including a breed of the Sable Island horse. The park is also a breeding ground for marine life.

In July 2016, a hike across Sable Island was added to Google Street View. Google worked with the park service to add the interactive views of Sable, as well as five national parks across the country. The imagery was collected in September 2015 by a Parks employee who carried a backpack version of the Street View car camera around an area on the centre of the island, part of Google's Trekker program which explores off-road scenic locations. The route follows a hiking route that the park service uses to escort adventure tourists.

== Geography ==
Sable Island is a narrow, crescent-shaped sandbar with a surface area estimated around 34 km^{2} (13 sq mi). Despite being approximately 43.15 km (26.81 mi) long, it is only 1.21 km (0.75 mi) across at its widest point. The maximum elevation is about 30 m (98 ft). The long crescent-shaped island rises gently from the shallows of the continental shelf approximately 285 km (177 mi) east of Halifax, Nova Scotia. Its location, in tandem with the area's frequent fog and sudden strong storms (such as hurricanes and nor'easters), have resulted in over 350 recorded shipwrecks. It is often referred to as the Graveyard of the Atlantic, as it sits astride the great circle route from North America's east coast to Europe. The nearest landfall is 160 km (99 mi) to the northwest near Canso, Nova Scotia.

Sable Island is believed to have formed from a terminal moraine deposited on the continental shelf near the end of the last Ice Age. It is slowly moving as waves erode the western shore and new sand is added on the eastern shore, and continually changing shape through the effects of strong winds and violent ocean storms.

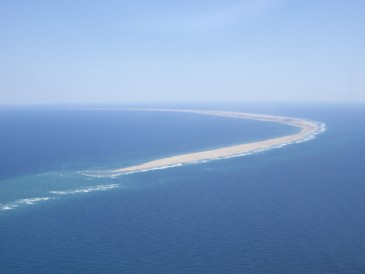
Sable Island from the northwest

The island has several freshwater ponds on the south side between the station and west light; in recent years their protecting dune-line has been eroded to such an extent that they are changing from one year to the next. In prior years, a brackish lake named Lake Wallace existed in the centre of the south beach. At its largest, it extended for many miles; during World War II, amphibious aircraft landed on it. Over the years, the lake shrank with an infilling of sand, until in late 2011, it filled in entirely and disappeared. Since the south beach is subject to flooding during fall storms, photos often show water in the area around the former location of Lake Wallace; this flooded area is relatively shallow (only a few feet at most) and is not a remnant of the lake. The original lake was of a significant enough depth that even during times when the area was flooded, the lake could be seen in aerial photographs as a darker (deeper) patch in the middle of the flooded area.

The island is a part of the Halifax Regional Municipality, the federal electoral district of Halifax, and the provincial electoral district of Halifax Citadel, although the urban area of Halifax proper is some 300 km (190 mi) away on the Nova Scotian mainland.

== Climate ==
Sable Island has a Maritime temperate climate (Köppen Cfb) using the −3 °C (27 °F) isotherm, or a warm-summer humid continental climate (Köppen Dfb) using the 0 °C (32 °F) with its climate being strongly influenced by the sea. As such, winter temperatures average near freezing while during the summer months, daily maximum temperatures average around 20 °C (68.0 °F). The average annual variation in temperature on Sable Island is only 19 °C (34 °F) owing to the influence from the sea compared to 24.3 °C (43.7 °F) at Halifax and 38.9 °C (70.0 °F) in Winnipeg. Generally, February is the coldest month while August is the warmest month.

Sable Island averages 1,511 mm (59.49 in) of precipitation a year, which is fairly evenly distributed throughout the year, though October through January are the wettest months due to frequent and intense fall and winter storms. Being located in the path of major frontal storms and tropical cyclones year-round, most of the precipitation comes from these storms. Thunderstorms are occasional, and happen on an average of 11 days per year. There are frequent heavy fogs in the area due to the contrasting effects of the cold Labrador Current and the warm Gulf Stream: on average there are 127 days out of the year that have at least 1 hour of fog. This makes Sable Island the foggiest place in the Maritimes. The foggiest season is during the summer months where July averages 22 fog days.

During the winter, Sable Island has the warmest temperatures in Canada apart from the Pacific Coast and can have the warmest temperatures in the country on some occasions due to the influence of the Gulf Stream. Due to its maritime influence, snowfall is infrequent before late December, mainly falling occasionally in the three months from January to March. Although when it does fall it usually lies on the ground for no more than a few days at a time.

Summers are among the coolest in southern Canada though. It is also the most hurricane-prone part of Canada, also due to the Gulf Stream, and is the only place where Saffir–Simpson scale Category 3 hurricane-force winds are likely in all of Canada. The highest temperature recorded was 27.8 °C (82.0 °F) on August 27, 1951, while the lowest temperature recorded was −19.4 °C (−2.9 °F) on January 31, 1920.

Climate data for Sable Island (Sable Island Aerodrome) WMO ID: 71595; coordinates 43°55′46″N 59°57′35″W; elevation: 1.2 m (3 ft 11 in); 1991–2020 normals, extremes 1897−present (Note: Composite data from Sable Island: WMO ID: 73025; coordinates 43°55′53″N 60°00′30″W; elevation: 1.2 m (3 ft 11 in). Sable Island: WMO ID: 71600; coordinates 43°55′56″N 60°00′34″W; elevation: 5 m (16 ft). Sable Island: Climate ID: 8204701; coordinates 43°56′N 60°00′W; elevation: 4 m (13 ft).)
Month	Jan	Feb	Mar	Apr	May	Jun	Jul	Aug	Sep	Oct	Nov	Dec	Year
Record high humidex	15.2	13.2	13.7	15.0	20.0	28.1	32.8	35.3	34.2	30.7	22.3	17.4	35.3
Record high °C (°F)	14.5 (58.1)	12.8 (55.0)	13.7 (56.7)	13.9 (57.0)	17.8 (64.0)	21.7 (71.1)	26.7 (80.1)	27.8 (82.0)	27.0 (80.6)	22.8 (73.0)	18.9 (66.0)	15.6 (60.1)	27.8 (82.0)
Mean daily maximum °C (°F)	3.3 (37.9)	2.5 (36.5)	3.7 (38.7)	6.8 (44.2)	10.2 (50.4)	14.3 (57.7)	18.7 (65.7)	21.1 (70.0)	19.1 (66.4)	14.6 (58.3)	10.4 (50.7)	6.3 (43.3)	10.9 (51.6)
Daily mean °C (°F)	0.1 (32.2)	−0.5 (31.1)	1.0 (33.8)	4.2 (39.6)	7.6 (45.7)	11.6 (52.9)	16.2 (61.2)	18.5 (65.3)	16.5 (61.7)	12.2 (54.0)	7.7 (45.9)	3.5 (38.3)	8.2 (46.8)
Mean daily minimum °C (°F)	−3.0 (26.6)	−3.4 (25.9)	−1.7 (28.9)	1.6 (34.9)	4.8 (40.6)	8.9 (48.0)	13.6 (56.5)	15.9 (60.6)	13.8 (56.8)	9.6 (49.3)	5.0 (41.0)	0.6 (33.1)	5.5 (41.9)
Record low °C (°F)	−19.4 (−2.9)	−18.3 (−0.9)	−13.6 (7.5)	−8.9 (16.0)	−8.3 (17.1)	0.6 (33.1)	3.0 (37.4)	4.4 (39.9)	0.6 (33.1)	−1.2 (29.8)	−7.8 (18.0)	−16.7 (1.9)	−19.4 (−2.9)
Record low wind chill	−29.6	−33.0	−24.6	−20.4	−8.7	0.0	0.0	0.0	0.0	−3.1	−15.6	−25.7	−33.0
Average precipitation mm (inches)	133.2 (5.24)	—	137.7 (5.42)	—	97.5 (3.84)	95.8 (3.77)	—	—	—	—	—	—	—
Average precipitation days (≥ 0.2 mm)	21.9	—	18.0	—	15.5	12.4	—	—	—	—	—	—	—
Average relative humidity (%) (at 1500 LST)	77.8	77.7	76.0	78.7	82.2	84.5	87.1	83.4	78.0	76.1	76.4	76.9	79.6
Source: Environment and Climate Change Canada

According to Atlas Obscura, Sable Island lies in hardiness zone 8a (−12 to −9 °C (10 to 15 °F)) for plant hardiness.

=== Climate change ===
Being a large low-lying sandbar, Sable Island is vulnerable to sea level rise. This is further exacerbated by an ongoing increase in storm frequency and intensity caused by climate change, further eroding the island. These factors point toward Sable Island disappearing by the end of the 21st century.

== Vegetation and wildlife ==
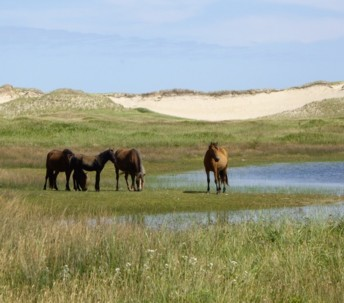
Sable Island horse

Sable Island derived its name from the French word for "sand". It lacks natural trees, being covered instead with marram grass and other low-growing vegetation. In 1901, the federal government planted over 80,000 trees in an attempt to stabilize the soil; all died. Subsequent plantings in the 1960s resulted in the survival of a single Scots pine, that only grew to a few feet tall. It was decorated yearly as a Christmas tree in December as part of a tradition among the station staff. In recent years, the tree was found to have died, marking the loss of the last remaining pine tree on the island.

Vegetation communities on Sable Island are largely grassland and heathland communities. Grassland areas on the island are dominated by American marram grass, which plays an important role in stabilizing the island's dunes. Sable Island's heathland communities are composed of shrub species such as black crowberry, northern bayberry, and creeping juniper. Other plants found on Sable Island include Virginia rose, seaside goldenrod, sea pea, and American cranberry.

The island is home to over 550 free-roaming horses according to a 2016 report, protected by law from human interference. During a 2017–2018 study, the estimated population was 500 horses, up from the roughly 300 recorded in the 1970s. Because of the harsh spring of 2017, the mortality rate was about 10% but the normal rate is about 1% annually, primarily due to starvation and hypothermia.

This feral horse population is likely descended from horses confiscated from Acadians during the Great Expulsion and left on the island by Thomas Hancock, Boston merchant and uncle of John Hancock. In the early 1800s, many of the horses were used by men patrolling the island, searching for ships in distress, and the animals also moved lifeboats and equipment to sites of shipwrecks.

In 1879, 500 horses and cattle were estimated to live on the island, and the island vegetation was described as covered with grass and wild peas. In the past, excess horses were rounded up, shipped off the island, and sold, many used in coal mines on Cape Breton Island, Nova Scotia. In 1960, the Canadian Government, under the Canada Shipping Act, gave the horse population full protection from human interference. This was partly motivated by a plan in the 1950s, eventually aborted due to public pressure, to remove the horses from the island, after some biologists reported that they were damaging the ecology of the land. Nonetheless, some continued to view the horses as an invasive species which is not suitable in a protected region where ecological integrity should be preserved according to the National Parks Act.

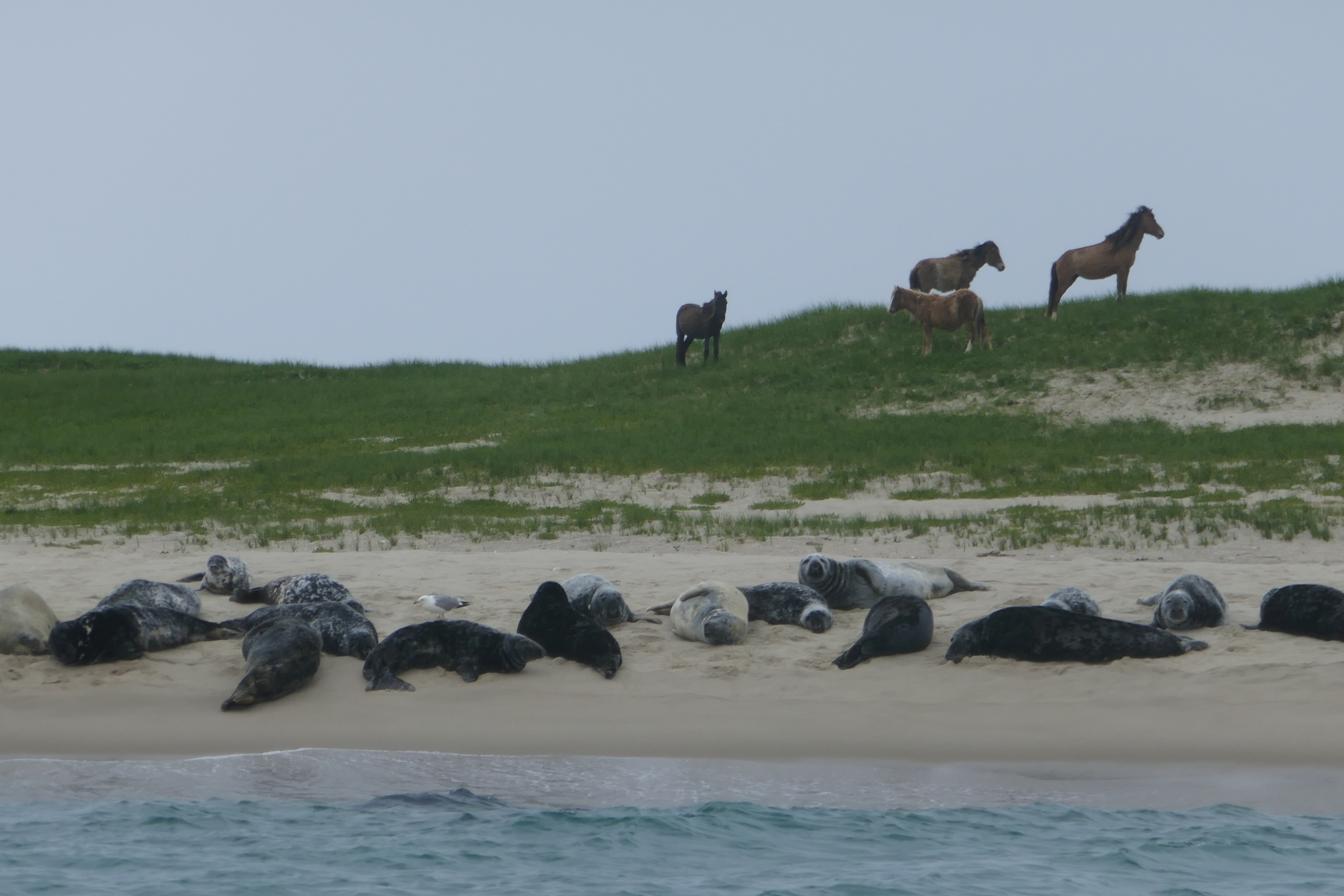
Atlantic grey seals on one of the island's beaches with Sable Island horses visible in the background.

Sable Island is home to the world's largest colony of grey seals, which congregate on the island every winter in the hundreds of thousands. Both grey seals and Harbour seals breed on the island's shores. Seal counts from the 1960s for the grey seal population estimated 200–300 pups born at that time on the island, but surveys from as recent as 2016 estimated the number of pups born in that season at 87,500. The seals are occasionally preyed upon by the various shark species that inhabit the waters nearby. Unusual corkscrew bite wounds found on dead seals were believed to be caused by the Greenland shark. Further research has revealed that these injuries are due to intraspecific predation, often by adult male grey seals.

Several large bird colonies are resident, including the Arctic tern and Ipswich sparrow, a subspecies of the Savannah sparrow which breeds only on the island. Many other species are resident, migratory, or transient, blown out to sea in storms and returned to land out of their natural range.

It was formerly believed the freshwater sponge Heteromeynia macouni, was found only in ponds on the island. It is now considered to be the same species as Racekiela ryderi, found elsewhere.

Over the centuries, many different types of livestock were imported to the island by the various groups of settlers who travelled there. Cattle, goats, sheep, pigs and horses were historically kept on the island (by at least the late 1700s) as a food resource. With no natural predators on the island, livestock animals were often allowed to roam freely. While not mentioned in the earliest records, later records kept by people living on Sable Island also mention chickens. Today, the only livestock animals remaining on the island are horses, which exist in an entirely wild state.

Historically, there was a population of walrus on the island, which may have served as a breeding ground for the animal's northwestern Atlantic population. Eyewitness accounts from the 1600s described the animal as being abundant at that time. Throughout the 1700s and 1800s, walrus in the northwestern Atlantic were heavily hunted for their ivory, as well as for their fat and hides. This population was eventually driven to extirpation throughout the region. The last record of walrus on Sable Island dates to the late 1800s. Evidence of the island's former walrus population can still be found today when centuries old skeletal remains like tusks and skulls are revealed by the island's shifting sands.

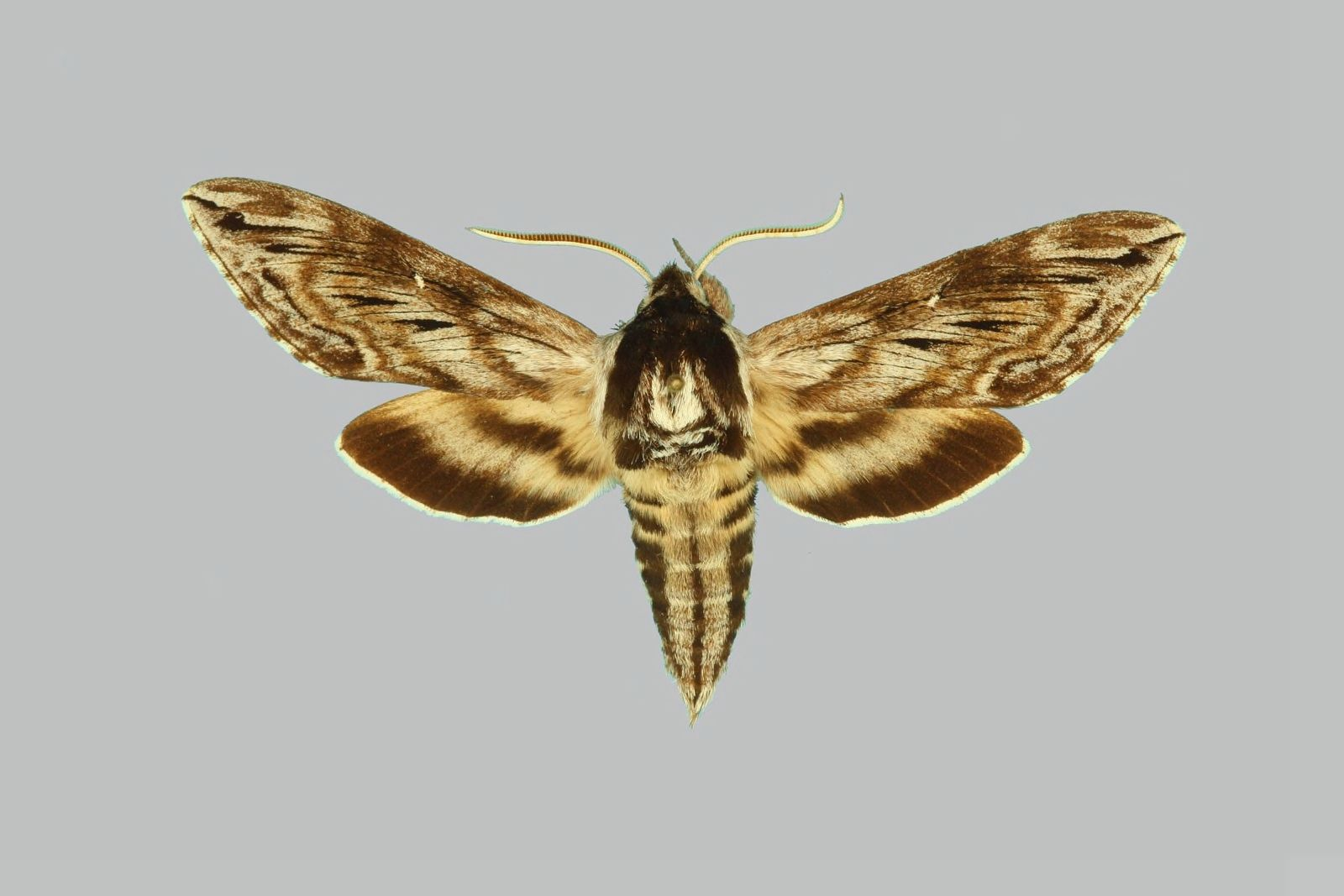
Sphinx poecila, the largest known moth on Sable Island.

Sable Island is home to a community of terrestrial invertebrates, with at least six species that are endemic to the island. Several lepidopterans found on Sable Island may represent distinct subspecies from populations found on the mainland. The halictid, Lasioglossum sablense, or the Sable Island sweat bee, is a species endemic to Sable Island.

== Sable Island Station ==
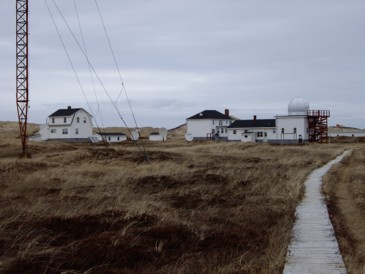
Sable Island station

Sable Island Aerodrome
- IATA: YSA; ICAO: none; TC LID: CSB2

Summary
- Airport type: Private
- Owner/Operator: Parks Canada
- Location: Sable Island, Nova Scotia
- Time zone: AST (UTC−04:00)
  - Summer (DST): ADT (UTC−03:00)
- Elevation AMSL: 4 ft (1.2 m)
- Coordinates: 43°55′46″N 059°57′35″W

Map
- Location in Canada

Runways
Direction	Length		Surface
Direction	ft	m	Surface
11/29	1,500	457	Sand
- Source: Canada Flight Supplement

The Sable Island Main Station, managed and staffed by Parks Canada, is the only permanently staffed facility on the island. Climatological record-keeping on Sable Island began in 1871 with the establishment of the Meteorological Service of Canada, and ran continuously from 1891 until August 20, 2019.

Sable Island has been the subject of extensive scientific research over the years. The Meteorological Service of Canada operated a wide range of manual and automated instruments, including the Automated Weather Observing System, an aerology program measuring conditions in the upper atmosphere using a radiosonde carried aloft by a hydrogen-filled weather balloon to altitudes beyond 40 km (25 mi), and a program collecting data on background levels of carbon dioxide, which began there in 1974. Research was done to monitor the long-range transport of pollution aerosols. Fog chemistry has also been studied, examining the transport and composition of atmospheric toxins it carries. Tropospheric ozone was measured and analyzed by researchers in Canada and the United States along with 20 other North American sites. The upper-air aerology program ended on August 20, 2019.

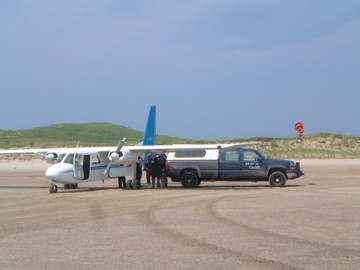
Britten-Norman Islander being unloaded on the beach at Sable Island

The installation of the BGS Magnetic Observatory on Sable Island was funded as a joint venture between the British Geological Survey, Sperry-Sun Drilling Services, and Sable Offshore Energy. The data it collects aid scientific research into rates of change of the Earth's magnetic field and increase the accuracy of the BGS Global Geomagnetic Model. Data from the geomagnetic observatory is used by the offshore energy industry for precise positioning activities such as directional drilling.

Supplies are delivered to the Sable Island Station approximately twice a month by Sable Aviation using a Britten-Norman Islander. Although the island has a heliport (CST5) with an 80 ft (24 m) diameter concrete pad, there is no permanent runway for fixed wing aircraft, which land instead on the south beach in an area designated as the Sable Island Aerodrome (CSB2). Prior permission is required to land, as the area is often unusable due to changing sand conditions.

== In popular culture ==
The landscape, history of shipwrecks, and wildlife, especially horses, have made Sable Island an iconic place in Atlantic Canada and attracted considerable international following.

=== In non-fiction ===
Shipwreck survivors published early survival narratives about their experiences at Sable Island, beginning with the sinking of the Delight in 1583. The first formal history of the island, Sable Island: its History and Phenomena, was written in 1894 by George Patterson. Many other histories of the island and its shipwrecks have been published since, such as Lyall Campbell's two books – Sable Island, Fatal and Fertile Crescent in 1974 and Sable Island Shipwrecks: Disaster and Survival at the North Atlantic Graveyard in 1994 – and more recently, A Dune Adrift: The Strange Origins and Curious History of Sable Island, written in 2004 by Marq de Villiers. In his 1997 book, The Perfect Storm, Sebastian Junger briefly describes the geography and history of the island. Joshua Slocum describes Sable Island in Sailing Alone Around the World during his 1895 solo circumnavigation.

=== In fiction ===
The island has also inspired works of fiction beginning in 1802 when Nova Scotia author Thomas Chandler Haliburton published "The Sable Island Ghost", a story about a ghostly woman inspired by the loss of the brig Francis in 1798. His story helped raise support for the establishment of a rescue station on the island. Canadian writer James Macdonald Oxley wrote a youth novel The Wreckers of Sable Island in 1897. Frank Parker Day's 1928 novel Rockbound features a vivid depiction of the sinking of the schooner Sylvia Mosher during the 1926 Nova Scotia hurricane at Sable Island. One of the island's most notable temporary residents was Nova Scotian author Thomas Head Raddall, whose early experiences working at the wireless post there served as the inspiration for his 1950 novel The Nymph and the Lamp. In his novel The Templar Throne, published in June 2010, author Paul Christopher mentions the island as the final location of the Ark of the Covenant, the True Ark of the Christian Old Testament.

=== In photography ===
The dunes and horses of Sable Island have drawn many photographers. Among the first was Arthur Williams McCurdy who photographed the island, its horses and shipwrecks in 1898 for National Geographic during a visit with Alexander Graham Bell. A further National Geographic visit in the summer of 1964 yielded an article entitled Sable Island; Graveyard of the Atlantic. In more recent times, Roberto Dutesco, a fashion photographer, began taking photos of Sable horses in 1994 and features this work in a permanent photo exhibition entitled "Wild Horses of Sable Island" at his gallery in New York. Nova Scotian photographer Paul Illsley's photographs of Sable Island horses inspired both a Canadian stamp and coin in 2005.

=== In music ===
In 1970 Stompin' Tom Connors published his song "Sable Island" in 1970's Stompin' Tom Meets Big Joe Mufferaw. Canadian folk singer Catherine McKinnon recorded a song arranged by Don Gillis also entitled "Sable Island" for the Canadian Broadcasting Corporation in 1975. The first line of the Buck 65 song "Blood of a Young Wolf" is "Ten thousand horses, Sable Island, endless summer".

=== In documentaries ===
The island has been the subject of many Canadian documentaries by the Canadian Broadcasting Corporation and the National Film Board of Canada, beginning with the 1956 NFB film Sable Island by Allan Wargon, the 2003 NFB documentary Moving Sands by Phillipe Baylaucq, and more recently, an episode of Land and Sea. In 2002 a documentary was released called Catching a Killer: The Mystery of Sable Island which investigated the possibility that Greenland sharks were to blame for the corkscrew lacerations on dead seals found washed up on the island. A recent work about Sable Island is the 2015 Canadian-produced film, "S(t)able Island: The Beauty of the Free", created by Rae-Anne LaPlante. The film explores in-depth the wild horse population that has called Sable Island its home for over 250 years. A number of international documentaries have also explored the island, including the 2007 film Île de sable made by Jean-François Ducrocq and Malek Sahraoui for France 3, French public television. In 2007, Matt Trecartin of Halifax directed Chasing Wild Horses, a documentary about photographer Roberto Dutesco and his photography of the Sable Island horses. The most recent effort is a Canadian documentary film by Jacquelyn Mills, titled Geographies of Solitude, released in 2022. The 103-minute film features Zoe Lucas, an environmentalist and naturalist who lives on the island and studies the wild Sable Island horse.

=== In other films ===
In the 1937 film Captains Courageous, the fishing boat passes Sable Island on the way to the Grand Banks of Newfoundland. Spencer Tracy's character Manuel later says his father died off Cape Sable. Sable Island is briefly featured in the 2000 feature film The Perfect Storm, which depicts the sinking of the fishing vessel Andrea Gail near Sable, although the island is erroneously portrayed with trees and a giant stone lighthouse. Sable Island is the setting for the 2002 film Touching Wild Horses starring Jane Seymour; little attempt was made to mimic the natural landscape of Sable, with trees and rocks abounding in the background of most every scene. Instead, Sandbanks Provincial Park in Ontario stood in for the island in the film.

=== In exhibits ===
A permanent exhibit about Sable Island is featured at the Maritime Museum of the Atlantic in Halifax, which includes two rescue boats from Sable and numerous name boards and figureheads from Sable Island wrecks. Another permanent exhibit about Sable Island, exploring its ecology and the on-island researchers' work, is found at the Nova Scotia Museum of Natural History. The horses were featured in a 1994 exhibit at the Equine Museum of Japan in Yokohama.

=== On radio ===
On September 11, 2014, Don Connolly of CBC Radio's Information Morning broadcast part of the daily current affairs program from Sable Island. It was the first ever live public radio broadcast from the island.

In amateur radio, Sable Island is considered a separate country with the call sign prefix CY0. Since enthusiasts collect contacts from different countries and there are few inhabitants on Sable Island, a contact from there would be considered a "rare DX". As a result, a number of private expeditions (known as DX-peditions) to operate temporary radio stations on Sable Island have been mounted. The most recent DX-pedition is CY0S, which is ongoing as of March 2026. The previous DXpedition by CY0S was in March 2023. There have also been DXpeditions in October 2012 (CY0), March 2011 (CY0), July 2008 (CY0X), November 2002 (CY0MM), October 1995 (CY0TP), and October 1975 (VX9A).

== See also ==
- List of national parks of Canada

== Bibliography ==
- Sable Island, by Bruce Armstrong, ISBN 0-385-13113-5, Doubleday, July 1981
- Wild Horses of Sable Island, by Zoe Lucas, ISBN 0-919872-73-5, Firefly Books Ltd., August 1992
- Wild and Beautiful Sable Island, Pat Keough et al., ISBN 0-9692557-3-X, Green Publishing, September 1993
- Sable Island Journals 1801–1804, by James Rainstorpe Morris, ISBN 0-9689245-0-6, January 2001
- Ethos of Voice in the Journal of James Rainstorpe Morris from the Sable Island Humane Station, 1801–1802, by Rosalee Stilwell, ISBN 0-7734-7663-6, Edwin Mellen Press, January 2001
- Free as the Wind: Saving the Horses of Sable Island, text by Jamie Bastedo, illustrations by Susan Tooke, Red Deer Press, 2007
