= Roberto Dutesco =

Canadian artist

- Born: June 6, 1961 (age 65); Bucharest, Romania
- Education: Bucharest National University of Arts, Bucharest; Dawson Institute of Photography, Montreal
- Known for: Artist

Roberto Dutesco (Romanian: Robert Duțescu; born June 6, 1961) is a Romanian-born Canadian artist, photographer and filmmaker. He travels and works worldwide and resides in his three homes, in Montreal, New York City and São Paulo, Brazil.

Dutesco began his career as a fashion photographer in Montreal, Canada. In 1994, he shifted the focus of his work to long-term personal projects that explore his environmental interests and natural subject. His photographs of the landscapes, wildlife, and horses of Sable Island have been on permanent exhibition since 2006 in Soho, New York City, at two locations (initially at 13 Crosby Street and presently at 64 Grand Street). The gallery was being showcased in New York City's Union Square (200 Park Avenue South) and has now moved to a wonderful 10,000 square foot space in Red Hook, Brooklyn at 160 Imlay Street.

== Photography ==
The Wild Horses of Sable Island

In 1994, Dutesco traveled to Sable Island, a small island off the coast of Nova Scotia. The island is a narrow, crescent-shaped sandbar with a surface area of about 34 square kilometers (13 square miles) and is home to an estimated 400 feral horses.

Before he was allowed to make his journey to the island, the trip required Canadian Coast Guard clearance. His first trip yielded a collection of photographs of the horse sanctuary, which inspired his lifelong project to photograph and film the wild horses. Since then, he has returned to Sable Island six times to document its landscape and wildlife. His intention with this body of work is to heighten awareness for conservation projects.

In the early 1990s, he opened his studio in New York City. He spent the majority of his time traveling for his various projects. In the past 20 years, his work has taken him to over sixty countries where he has met and photographed such prominent personalities as Pierre Trudeau, the 14th Dalai Lama and Mikhail Gorbachev.

After the first trip to Sable Island, Dutesco returned to his work on fashion and art photography. In 1994, he abandoned his commercial work and fully devoted his work to his self-assigned projects: photography, filming, and writing.

The American Sandscape Series

Between 1994 and 2004, Dutesco traveled across the southwestern United States, (California, Utah, New Mexico, and Colorado), documenting its “sandscapes.”

The 14th Dalai Lama

In 2003, Dutesco was asked to create an outdoor exhibition to be installed on the streets of downtown Montreal; the theme for the installation was global peace. He travelled to Dharamshala, McLeod Ganj, in order to secure a private sitting for a photograph of the 14th Dalai Lama to include in the exhibit. Also included in the exhibition were his images of the many young lamas in India. This comprehensive installation, entitled Here Is Now, was installed over a four-city-block radius on the McGill University campus in the summer of 2004. It included over three hundred of Dutesco's photographs.

Brancusí’s Endless Column

Brancusí’s sculpture the Endless Column was inaugurated in Târgu Jiu, Romania, in 1938 and was restored between the years of 1998 and 2000. In July 2005, Dutesco returned to Romania, where he spent 24 continuous hours photographing the sculpture, resulting in a series of graphic black-and-white visual interpretations of the piece.

== Publication ==
In 2012, Dutesco Art published a limited-edition book, The Wild Horses of Sable Island, of his intimate exploration of Sable Island over the previous 16 years. It was printed and handcrafted in Bologna, Italy. The volume includes a foreword by Jack Lenor Larsen and an introduction by writer Anthony Haden-Guest.

== Films ==
Dutesco's films include Sable Island, which he shot on 16-mm film with an Arriflex 16S camera. In 2000, he completed a black-and-white short film that was presented by the Angelika Film Center, New York City. Arcadia and CBC produced a film entitled Chasing Wild Horses in 2007, which premiered on Bravo TV in Canada in 2008 and was later shown on PBS. It was selected for the Tribeca Film Festival and was the winner of Best International Director of a Documentary at the New York International Independent Film and Video Festival. His film Time Squared is a visual journey of his travels to over 50 countries and is a compilation of what he filmed over a three-month period compressed into 20 minutes.

== Major exhibitions ==
- Sable Gallery, New York, The Wild Horses of Sable Island. (2006–present)
- The Embassy of Canada’s Gallery, Washington, DC, The Wild Horses of Sable Island. (2010–2011)
- Lord & Taylor, New York, Ethereal Reflections, featuring 26 flowers and 26 poems. (2009)
- LongHouse Reserve, East Hampton, New York, The Wild Horses of Sable Island. (2008)
- The National Arts Club, New York, premiere of the documentary Chasing Wild Horses. (2008)
- 13 Crosby, New York, Homage to Brancusí, featuring 250 photographs of the Endless Column by Brancusí. (2006)
- World Expo, Japan, The United States Pavilion, eight-by-twelve-foot, multi-paneled murals of the Sable Horses. (2005)
- Four city blocks in downtown Montreal, Canada, Here Is Now. (2004)
- Lord & Taylor, New York, American Sandscape. (2004
- Ralph Pucci, New York, The Wild Horses of Sable Island. (2004)
- United Nations, New York, A World Without Borders. (2003)
- The National Arts Club, New York, Sable Horses, Sand Dunes and Rocks & Things. (2002)
- Ralph Pucci, New York, American Sandscape. (2002)
- Sony Gallery, New York and Chicago, Sable Horses. (2002)

Dutesco's work has been exhibited internationally. Notably, his photographs of the Sable Island horses have been showcased in the United States, Japan, France, Switzerland, Singapore, Korea, Canada, and Brazil. In 2006, he opened the Wild Horses of Sable Island Gallery in SoHo, New York City, which has become one of the city's longest-running single-themed exhibitions. In February 2025, Dutesco's work was featured in the exhibition Through the Lens: Featuring Roberto Dutesco & The Wild Horses of Sable Island® at West Chelsea Contemporary in Austin, Texas. This marked the first time his celebrated photographs were exhibited in Texas.

== Charity work ==
Dutesco donates his art to support charitable organizations that are dedicated to the preservation of the environment, including Happy Hearts Fund, WindWalkers, Global Scribes, Cambodia’s Hope, David Sheldrick Wildlife Trust, the Dalai Lama Trust, Susan Finkelstein Charitable Trust, the Canadian Consulate, and the Sable Island Green Horse Society.

His commitment and donations to children’s charities include the following: Artrageous, Edwin Gould Services for Children and Families, CTREE, National Down Syndrome Society, Make-A-Wish Foundation, LongHouse, Urban Zen, LARC School, Montessori School of Manhattan, and the Regina Therapeutic Riding Association.

Conservation Efforts: Beyond photography, Dutesco is committed to conservation. In 2017, he launched IAMWILD, a global platform aimed at transforming business and conservation practices . A portion of proceeds from his art sales supports conservation initiatives. You can visit the site for more information at iamwild.org.
