= A. tricolor =

A. tricolor may refer to:

- Agelaius tricolor, the tricolored blackbird, a bird species found from Northern California in the United States to upper Baja California in Mexico
- Amaranthus tricolor, an ornamental plant species
- Atlapetes tricolor, the tricoloured brush-finch, a bird species found in Colombia, Ecuador, and Peru

== Synonyms ==
- Aganisia tricolor, a synonym for Aganisia cyanea, an orchid species

== See also ==
- Tricolor (disambiguation)
