= Acacallis =

Acacallis or Acalle may refer to:

- Acacallis (mythology) or Acalle, in Greek mythology, princess of Crete
- Acacallis (moth), a synonym of the moth genus Eudocima in the family Erebidae
- Acacallis (plant), a synonym of the orchid genus Aganisia in the family Orchidaceae
- Acalle (sponge), a genus of freshwater sponges

== See also ==
- Acalles, a genus of beetles
