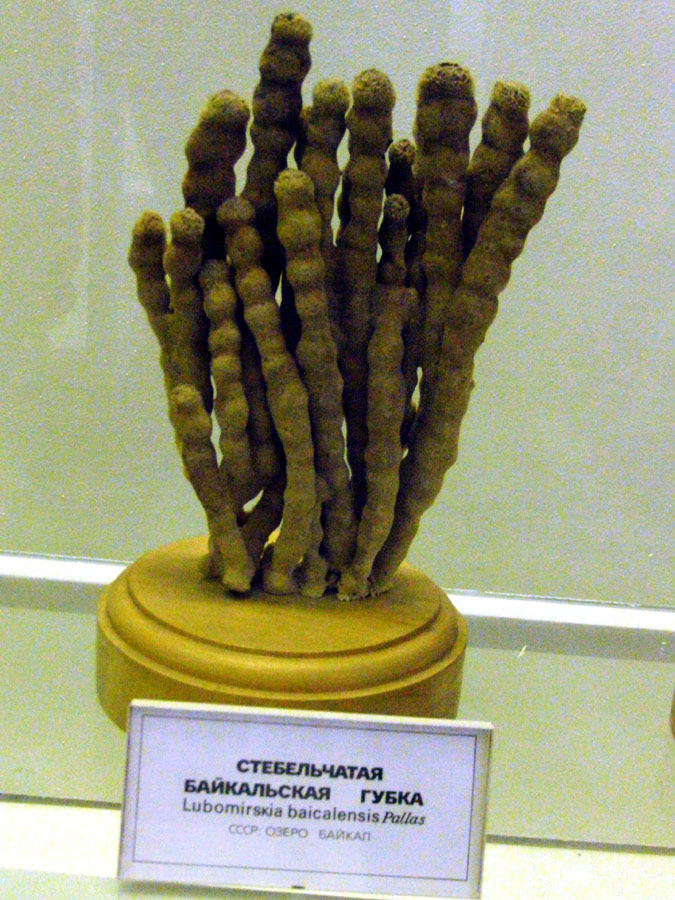
- Lubomirskia baicalensis; Museum specimen

Scientific classification
- Kingdom: Animalia
- Phylum: Porifera
- Class: Demospongiae
- Order: Spongillida
- Family: Lubomirskiidae; W. Weltner, 1895

Synonyms
- Lubomirskinae Weltner, 1895 Lubomirskidae Rezvoi, 1936

= Lubomirskiidae =

Family of sponges

Lubomirskiidae is a family of freshwater sponges from Lake Baikal in Russia, endemic to the lake, though there are unconfirmed reports from Lake Jegetai-Kul in the Western Sayan, along with the Bering Sea and the sea surrounding Kamchatka.

== Description ==
Lubomirskia baikalensis (the most abundant species), Baikalospongia bacillifera and B. intermedia are unusually large for freshwater sponges and can reach 1 m (3.3 ft) or more. These three are also the most common sponges in Lake Baikal. Lubomirskiid sponges are perennial, and may grow in multiple ways; they may encrust their substrate (cortical growth), or grow up into either a form low to the substrate (cushion-shaped) or a tall branching one. Growth is slow, around 1–2 centimetres (0.39–0.79 in) per year. Their skeleton is typically "multispicular alveolate-reticulate". Their megasclere spicules consist of spiny oxeas and strongyles, and they do not develop microscleres. Spongin is present throughout their body, such as the tips of their spicules, though this protein may be absent in some parts of the body. Going through a grade of Lubomirskia-Baikalospongia-Swartschewskia, the ectosomal skeleton ranges from "tufts" of spicule "from the primary fibres" to "hard and well-developed", while the choanosomal skeleton ranges from regularly anisotropic to "sparsely developed". Using this same grade, the consistency of the sponge's body ranges from elastic to fragile, though individuals of all species range from rigid to soft or flabby.

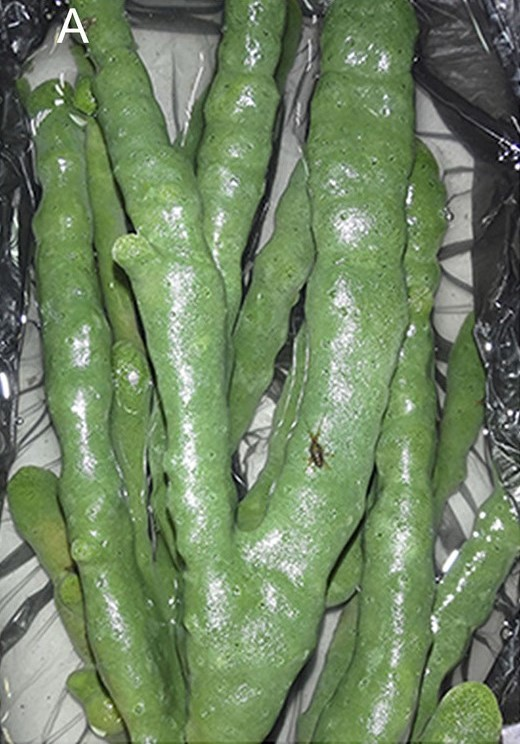
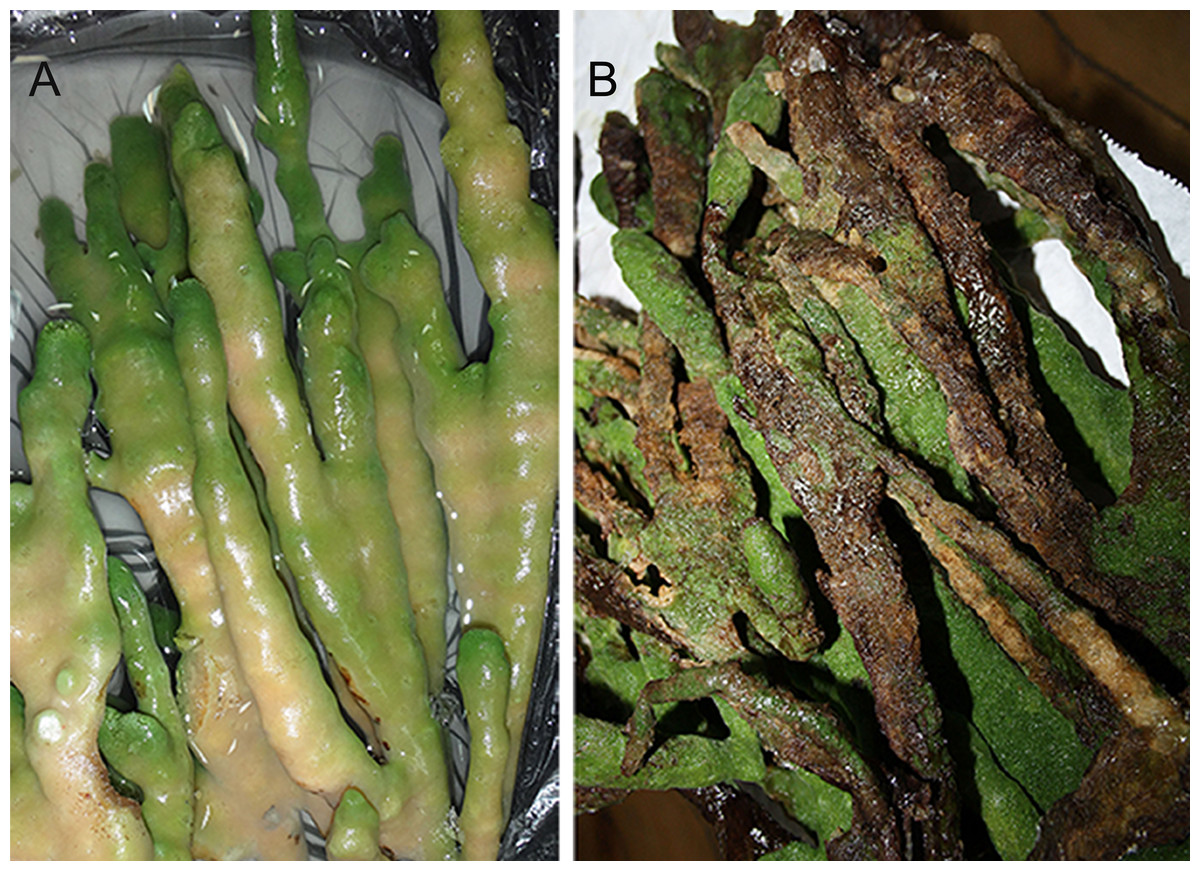
L. baikalensis of varying states; Top: Healthy, Left: Diseased, Right: Necrosed

Lubomirskiidae is endemic to Lake Baikal, being commonly found throughout the lake from depths of 2–533 metres (6 ft 7 in – 1,748 ft 8 in), though the various species have optimal habitat ranges where they can become abundant and dominate the ecosystem. Some species, such as L. abietina, B. martisoni, and B. fungiformis, have wide depth ranges; they are recorded close to the surface (10, 8, and 4.5 metres (33, 26, and 15 ft) deep respectively) and down in the "abyssal zone" of the lake (930, 840, and 1,100 metres (3,050, 2,760, and 3,610 ft) deep respectively). This family lacks the gemmules characteristic of Spongillids, which restricts them to sexual reproduction; along with their reliance on larval dispersal, this reproductive cycle is thought to have restricted them, along with fellow Spongillid families Malawispongiidae and Metschnikowiidae, within the ancient hydrographic basins and waterways that they are native to.

As typical of sponges in general, Lubomirskiids are filter feeders, which may make them useful as bioindicators of heavy metal pollution. Most sponges in the lake are typically green when alive because of photosynthetic microorganisms which symbiotically live within their tissues (zoochlorella, both dinoflagellates and Chlorophyta), but can also be brownish or yellowish. In 2011, cases of discolored sponges were first reported, where some stands would acquire a "dirty pink" color; these "bleached" sponges (similar to coral bleaching) experience a shift in their microbiome; an increase in cyanobacteria numbers is often observed. This bleaching disease risks the health of the sponge population in the lake as the Chlorophyta experience mass death, with the diseased sponges eventually undergoing necrosis. The death of sponges would affect the community of sponges and eventually the entire ecosystem of the lake itself.

== Genera and species ==
The family contains four genera and sixteen species. The different genera are distinguished by the characters of their megascleres, though molecular analysis may be more reliable as megasclere character states overlap between species and genera. Microsatellite markers may be the most reliable method of determining the phylogeny of these sponges.

- Genus Baikalospongia Annandale, 1914
  - Baikalospongia abyssalis Itskovich, Kaluzhnaya, Veynberg & Erpenbeck, 2017
  - Baikalospongia bacillifera Dybowsky, 1880
  - Baikalospongia dzhegatajensis Rezvoi, 1927
  - Baikalospongia fungiformis Makushok, 1927
  - Baikalospongia intermedia Dybowsky, 1880
    - Baikalospongia intermedia intermedia
    - Baikalospongia intermedia profundalis Rezvoy, 1936
  - Baikalospongia martinsoni Efremova, 2004
  - Baikalospongia recta Efremova, 2004
- Genus Lubomirskia Dybowsky, 1880
  - Lubomirskia abietina Swartschewsky, 1901
  - Lubomirskia baikalensis (Pallas, 1773)
  - Lubomirskia fusifera Soukatschoff, 1895
  - Lubomirskia incrustans Efremova, 2004
- Genus Rezinkovia Efremova, 2004
  - Rezinkovia arbuscula Efremova, 2004
  - Rezinkovia echinata Efremova, 2004
- Genus Swartschewskia Makuschok, 1927
  - Swartschewskia irregularis Swartschewsky, 1902
  - Swartschewskia khanaevi Bukshuk & Maikova, 2020
  - Swartschewskia papyracea (Dybowsky, 1880)

A number of phylogenetic analyses have been made to elaborate on the interrelationships of Lubomirskiidae; with some recent analyses having recovered the polyphyly of Baikalospongia.
