= Rezinkovia =

Scientific classification
- Domain: Eukaryota
- Kingdom: Animalia
- Phylum: Porifera
- Class: Demospongiae
- Order: Spongillida
- Family: Lubomirskiidae
- Genus: Rezinkovia; Efremova, 2004

Genus of sponges

Rezinkovia is a genus of sponges belonging to the family Lubomirskiidae.

Species:

- Rezinkovia arbuscula Efremova, 2004
- Rezinkovia echinata Efremova, 2004
