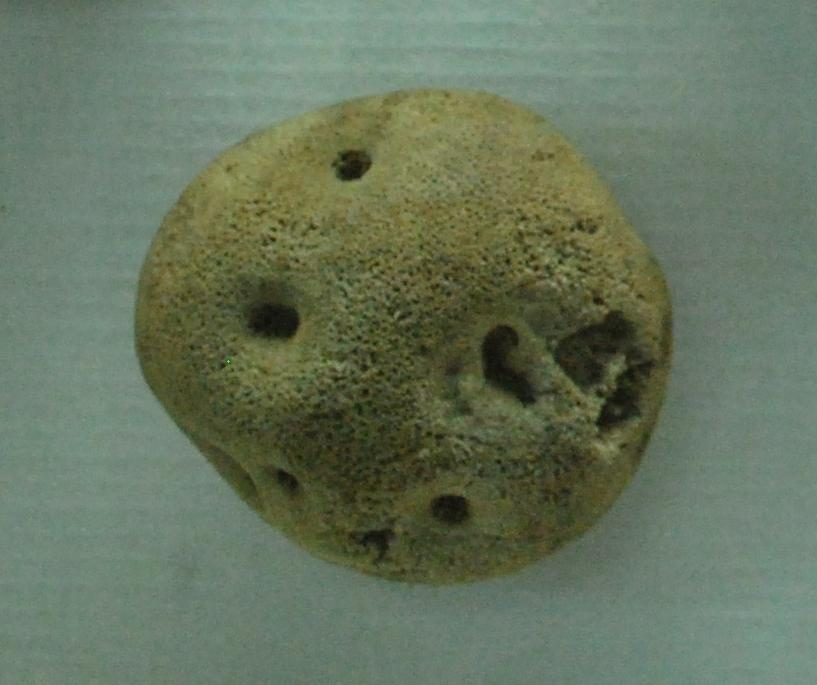

Scientific classification
- Domain: Eukaryota
- Kingdom: Animalia
- Phylum: Porifera
- Class: Demospongiae
- Order: Spongillida
- Family: Malawispongiidae
- Genus: Ochridaspongia
- Species: O. rotunda

Binomial name
- Ochridaspongia rotunda Arndt, 1937

= Ochridaspongia rotunda =

Species of sponge

Ochridaspongia rotunda is a freshwater sponge endemic to Lake Ohrid. This sponge is found mostly at depths of 30–50 m and water temperatures of 6–8 °C. Its circular shape indicates that the animal lives under conditions of relatively calm water.

== Possible medicinal uses ==
Following comparative tests with positive controls of its extracts against 8 bacterial and 8 fungal strains, Ohridaspongia rotunda has been described as a potential "gold mine of new antimicrobial substances with significant and broad-range activity". Current research is investigating its acetone extracts for application in the treatment of Alzheimer's disease, for which it has demonstrated promising inhibitory activity. These may originate with symbiotic bacteria hosted by the sponge and further research is required.
