= Corvomeyenia =

Scientific classification
- Domain: Eukaryota
- Kingdom: Animalia
- Phylum: Porifera
- Class: Demospongiae
- Order: Spongillida
- Family: Metaniidae
- Genus: Corvomeyenia; Weltner, 1913

Genus of sponges

Corvomeyenia is a genus of freshwater sponges in the family Metaniidae.

The species of this genus are found in several different geographic regions.

== Taxonomy ==
Corvomeyenia contains the following species:

- Corvomeyenia carolinensis Harrison, 1971
- Corvomeyenia epilithosa Volkmer-Ribeiro, Rosa-Barbosa & Machado, 2005
- Corvomeyenia everetti (Mills, 1884)
- Corvomeyenia thumi (Traxler, 1895)
