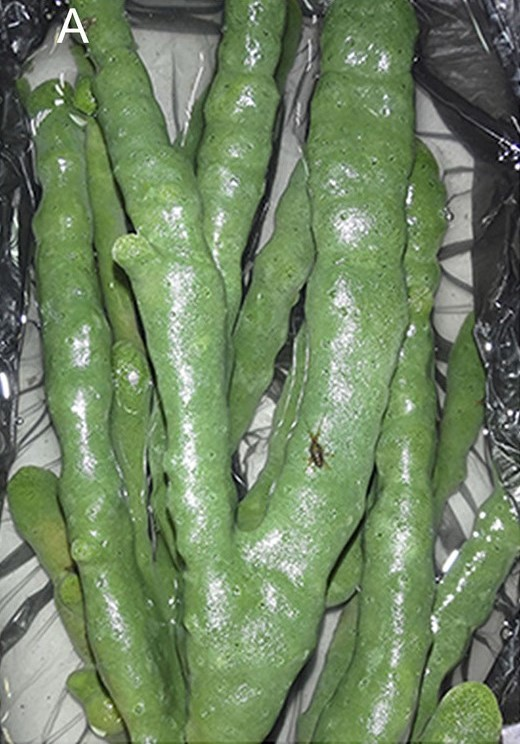
- Healthy specimen showing vivid green coloration

Scientific classification
- Domain: Eukaryota
- Kingdom: Animalia
- Phylum: Porifera
- Class: Demospongiae
- Order: Spongillida
- Family: Lubomirskiidae
- Genus: Lubomirskia
- Species: L. baikalensis

Binomial name
- Lubomirskia baikalensis (Pallas, 1773)

Synonyms
- Spongia baikalensis Pallas, 1776

= Lubomirskia baikalensis =

Species of sponge

Lubomirskia baikalensis is a freshwater species of sponge that is endemic to Lake Baikal, Russia. It is commonly called the Lake Baikal sponge and it is the most abundant sponge in the lake, but all the approximately 15 species of sponges in the family Lubomirskiidae are restricted to Baikal.

Lubomirskia baikalensis is found on hard bottoms at depths between 1 and 120 m (3–394 ft). In relatively shallow water, it is bark-like, and covers stones somewhat like a carpet. From a depth of 3–4 m (10–13 ft) it starts to have branches, and can reach a height of more than 1.2 m (4 ft), which is unusually large for a freshwater sponge. On rocky grounds at depths of 5–12 m (16–39 ft) the branching form is particularly common and may form "forests". Some specimens have been observed to be non-sessile, being fragments originating from sessile stands which have broken free and drift above the soft benthic sediment.

This sponge is in mutual symbiosis with a green dinoflagellate, making it green in appearance. Okadaic acid produced by the dinoflagellate assists the sponge to survive when Lake Baikal is iced over in winter, and the water temperature is close to 0 °C (32 °F).
