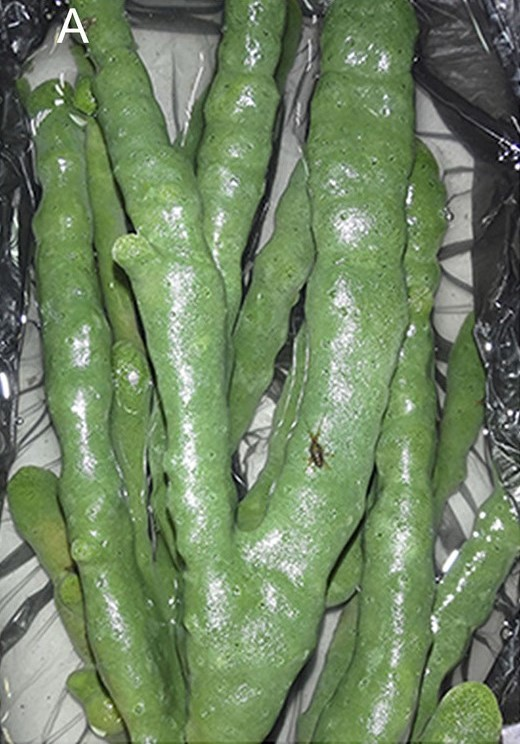

Scientific classification
- Kingdom: Animalia
- Phylum: Porifera
- Class: Demospongiae
- Order: Spongillida
- Family: Lubomirskiidae
- Genus: Lubomirskia; Dybowsky, 1880

= Lubomirskia =

Genus of sponges

Lubomirskia is a genus of sponges belonging to the family Lubomirskiidae.

All species within this genus are found in Lake Baikal.

Species:

- Lubomirskia abietina Swartschewsky, 1901
- Lubomirskia baikalensis (Pallas, 1776)
- Lubomirskia fusifera Soukatschoff, 1895
- Lubomirskia incrustans Efremova, 2004
