= Houssayella =

Scientific classification
- Domain: Eukaryota
- Kingdom: Animalia
- Phylum: Porifera
- Class: Demospongiae
- Order: Spongillida
- Family: Metaniidae
- Genus: Houssayella; Bonetto & Ezcurra de Drago, 1966

Genus of sponges

Houssayella is a genus of freshwater sponges in the family Metaniidae.

The species of this genus are found in South America.

== Taxonomy ==
Houssayella contains the following species:

  - Houssayella iguazuensis Bonetto & Ezcurra de Drago, 1966
