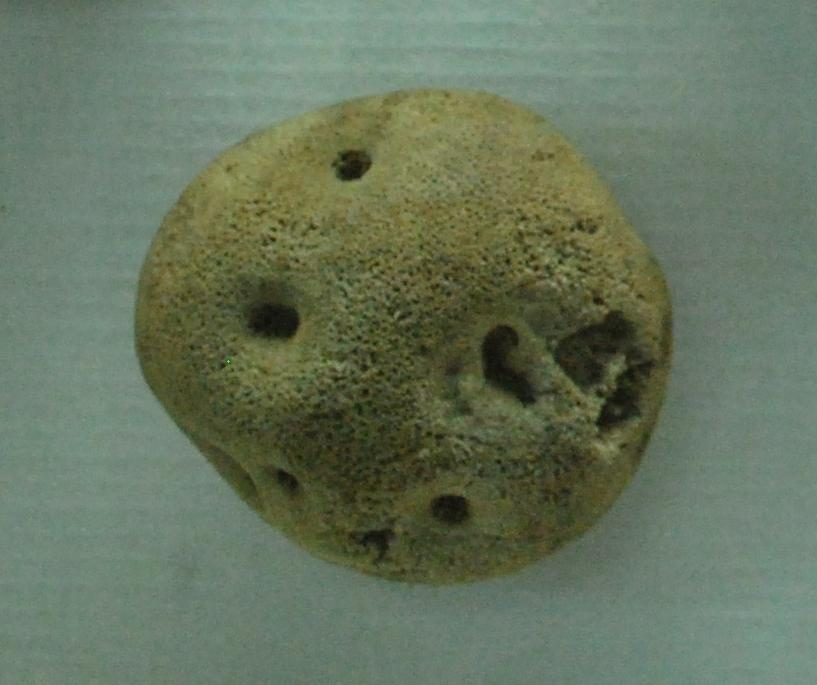
- Ochridaspongia rotunda

Scientific classification
- Domain: Eukaryota
- Kingdom: Animalia
- Phylum: Porifera
- Class: Demospongiae
- Order: Spongillida
- Family: Malawispongiidae
- Genus: Ochridaspongia; Arndt, 1937

= Ochridaspongia =

Genus of sponges

Ochridaspongia is genus of freshwater sponges containing two species:

- Ochridaspongia rotunda
- Ochridaspongia interlithonis

These species are endemic and live only in Lake Ohrid. Ochridaspongia rotunda is found mostly at depths of 30–50 m and water temperatures of 6–8 °C. Its circular shape indicates the animal lives under conditions of relatively calm water.
