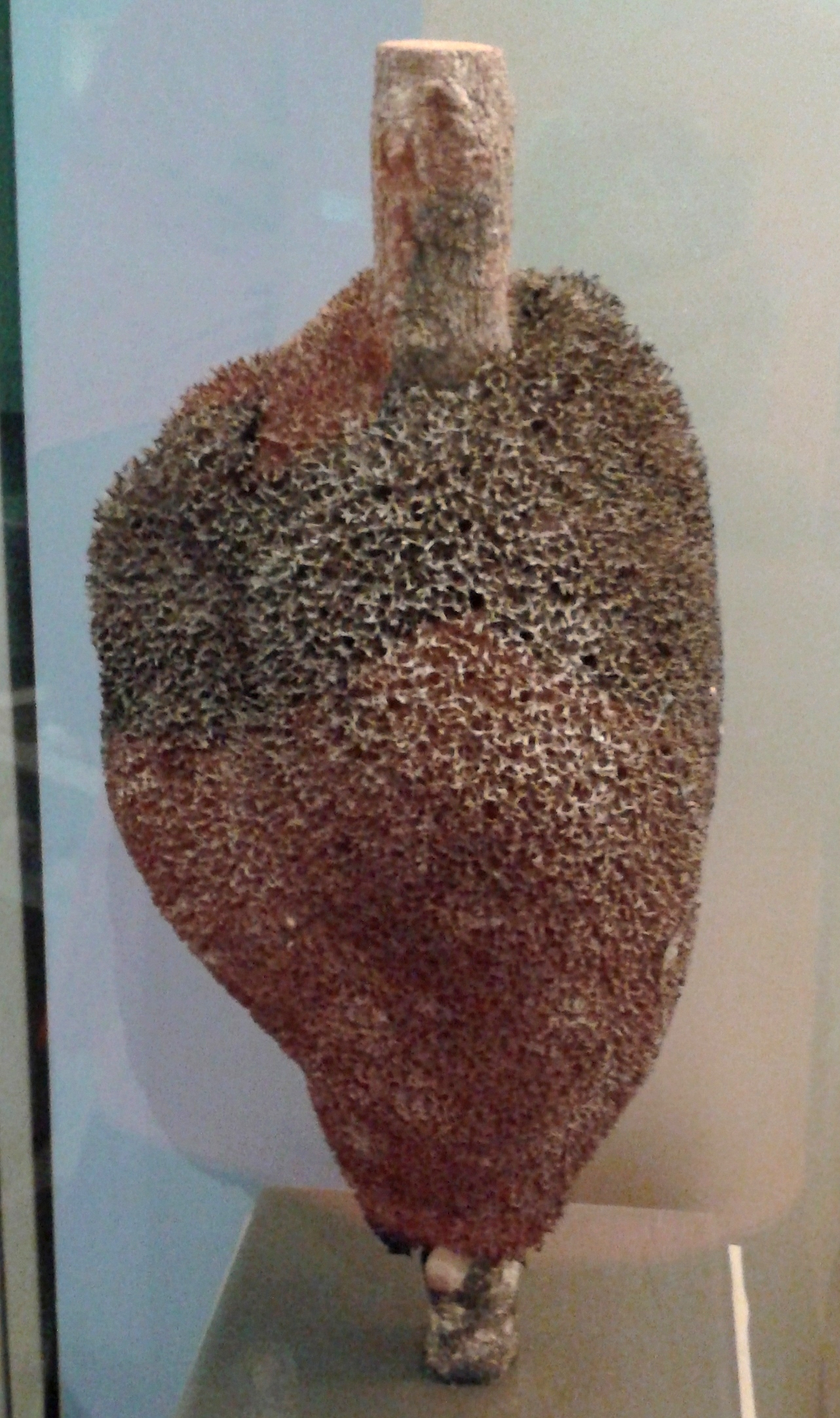
- Drulia brownii

Scientific classification
- Kingdom: Animalia
- Phylum: Porifera
- Class: Demospongiae
- Order: Spongillida
- Family: Metaniidae
- Genus: Drulia; Gray, 1867

= Drulia (sponge) =

Genus of sponges

Drulia is a genus of freshwater sponges in the family Metaniidae.

The species of this genus are found in South America.

== Taxonomy ==
Drulia contains the following species:

- Drulia batesii (Bowerbank, 1863)
- Drulia brownii (Bowerbank, 1863)
- Drulia conifera Bonetto & Ezcurra de Drago, 1973
- Drulia cristata (Weltner, 1895)
- Drulia cristinae Volkmer-Ribeiro, Drago, Machado & Sabaj, 2017
- Drulia ctenosclera Volkmer & Mothes, 1981
- Drulia geayi (Gravier, 1899)
- Drulia uruguayensis Bonetto & Ezcurra de Drago, 1969
