= Potamophloios =

Scientific classification
- Domain: Eukaryota
- Kingdom: Animalia
- Phylum: Porifera
- Class: Demospongiae
- Order: Spongillida
- Family: Potamolepidae
- Genus: Potamophloios; Brien, 1970

Genus of sponges

Potamophloios is a genus of freshwater sponges within the family Potamolepidae.

== Species ==
- †Potamophloios canadensis Pisera, Siver & Wolfe, 2013
- Potamophloios gilberti Brien, 1969
- Potamophloios guairensis Volkmer-Ribeiro, Parolin, Fürstenau-Oliveira & Menezes, 2010
- Potamophloios hispida Brien, 1969
- Potamophloios songoloensis Brien, 1969
- Potamophloios stendelli (Jaffé, 1916)
- Potamophloios symoensi (Brien, 1967)
