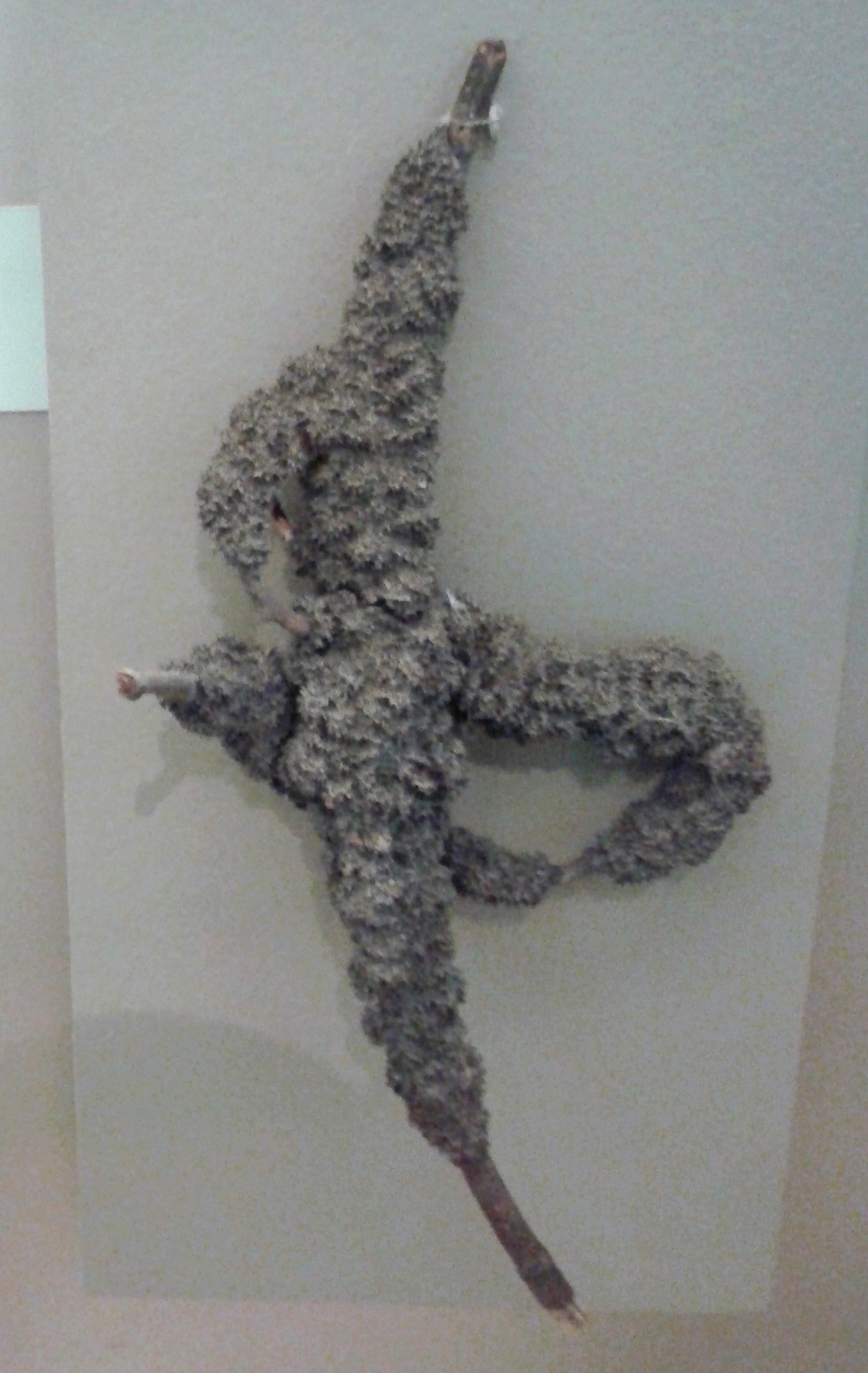

Scientific classification
- Kingdom: Animalia
- Phylum: Porifera
- Class: Demospongiae
- Order: Spongillida
- Family: Metaniidae
- Genus: Metania; Gray, 1867

= Metania (sponge) =

Genus of sponges

Metania is a genus of sponges in the family Metaniidae.

The species of this genus are found in Malesia and Australia.

== Taxonomy ==
Metania contains the following species:

- Metania fittkaui Volkmer-Ribeiro, 1979
- Metania godeauxi (Brien, 1968)
- Metania kiliani Volkmer-Ribeiro & Costa, 1992
- Metania madagascariensis Manconi & Pronzato, 2015
- Metania melloleitaoi Machado, 1948
- Metania ovogemata Stanisic, 1979
- Metania pottsi (Weltner, 1895)
- Metania reticulata (Bowerbank, 1863)
- Metania rhodesiana Burton, 1938
- Metania spinata (Carter, 1881)
- Metania subtilis Volkmer, 1979
- Metania vesparioides (Annandale, 1908)
- Metania vesparium (Martens, 1868)
