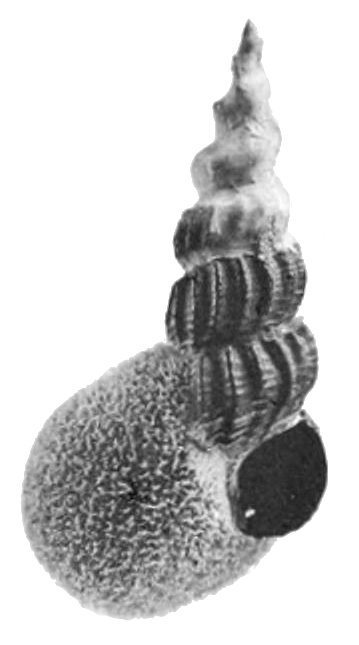
- Pachydictyum globosum on a shell of the freshwater snail Tylomelania centaurus from Sulawesi

Scientific classification
- Domain: Eukaryota
- Kingdom: Animalia
- Phylum: Porifera
- Class: Demospongiae
- Order: Spongillida
- Family: Malawispongiidae
- Genus: Pachydictyum
- Species: P. globosum

Binomial name
- Pachydictyum globosum Weltner, 1901

= Pachydictyum =

Pachydictyum globosum

Genus of sponges

Pachydictyum is a genus of freshwater sponge in the family Malawispongiidae. It is monotypic and represented by a single species, Pachydictyum globosum. It lives in Sulawesi, Indonesia.
