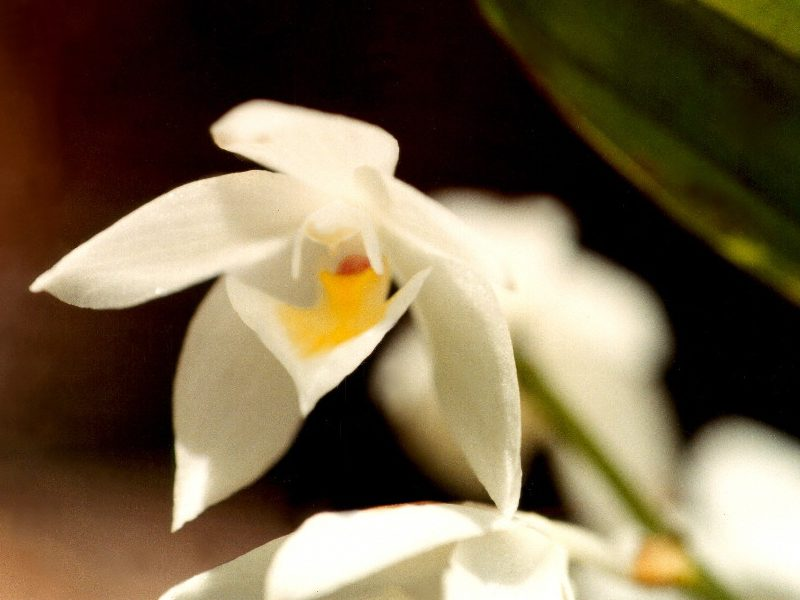
- photo by Marcos Antonio Campacci

Scientific classification
- Kingdom: Plantae
- Clade: Tracheophytes
- Clade: Angiosperms
- Clade: Monocots
- Order: Asparagales
- Family: Orchidaceae
- Subfamily: Epidendroideae
- Genus: Aganisia
- Species: A. pulchella

Binomial name
- Aganisia pulchella Lindl. (1839)

Synonyms
- Aganisia brachypoda Schltr. (1925)

= Aganisia pulchella =

Species of orchid

Aganisia pulchella is a species of orchid native to Trinidad, French Guiana, Suriname, Guyana, Venezuela, Brazil. It is the type species of the genus Aganisia.
