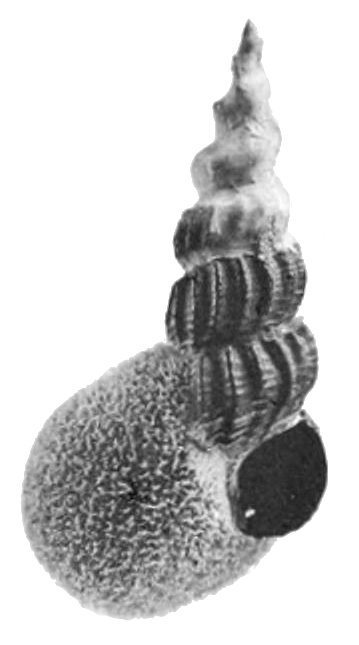
- An apertural view of the shell of Tylomelania centaurus from its type description (holotype, NMB 1339a from Natural History Museum of Basel). The shell is partly covered by the sponge Pachydictyum globosum.

Scientific classification
- Domain: Eukaryota
- Kingdom: Animalia
- Phylum: Mollusca
- Class: Gastropoda
- Subclass: Caenogastropoda
- Family: Pachychilidae
- Genus: Tylomelania
- Species: T. centaurus

Binomial name
- Tylomelania centaurus (Sarasin & Sarasin, 1898)

Synonyms
- Melania centaurus Sarasin & Sarasin, 1898

= Tylomelania centaurus =

Species of gastropod

Tylomelania centaurus is a species of freshwater snail with an operculum, an aquatic gastropod mollusk in the family Pachychilidae.

== Distribution ==
This species occurs in Lake Poso, Sulawesi, Indonesia.

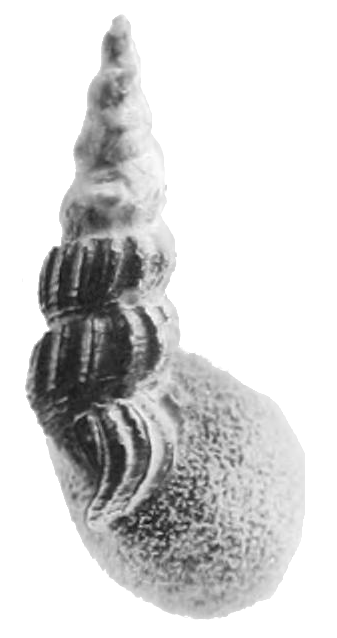
Lateral view of the holotype of Tylomelania centaurus

== Description ==
The shell has 7.5 whorls. The height of the shell is 44 mm (1.7 in). The width of an aperture is 8 mm (0.31 in). The height of an aperture is 11 mm (0.43 in).

== Ecology ==
Tylomelania centaurus is a lacustrine species.
