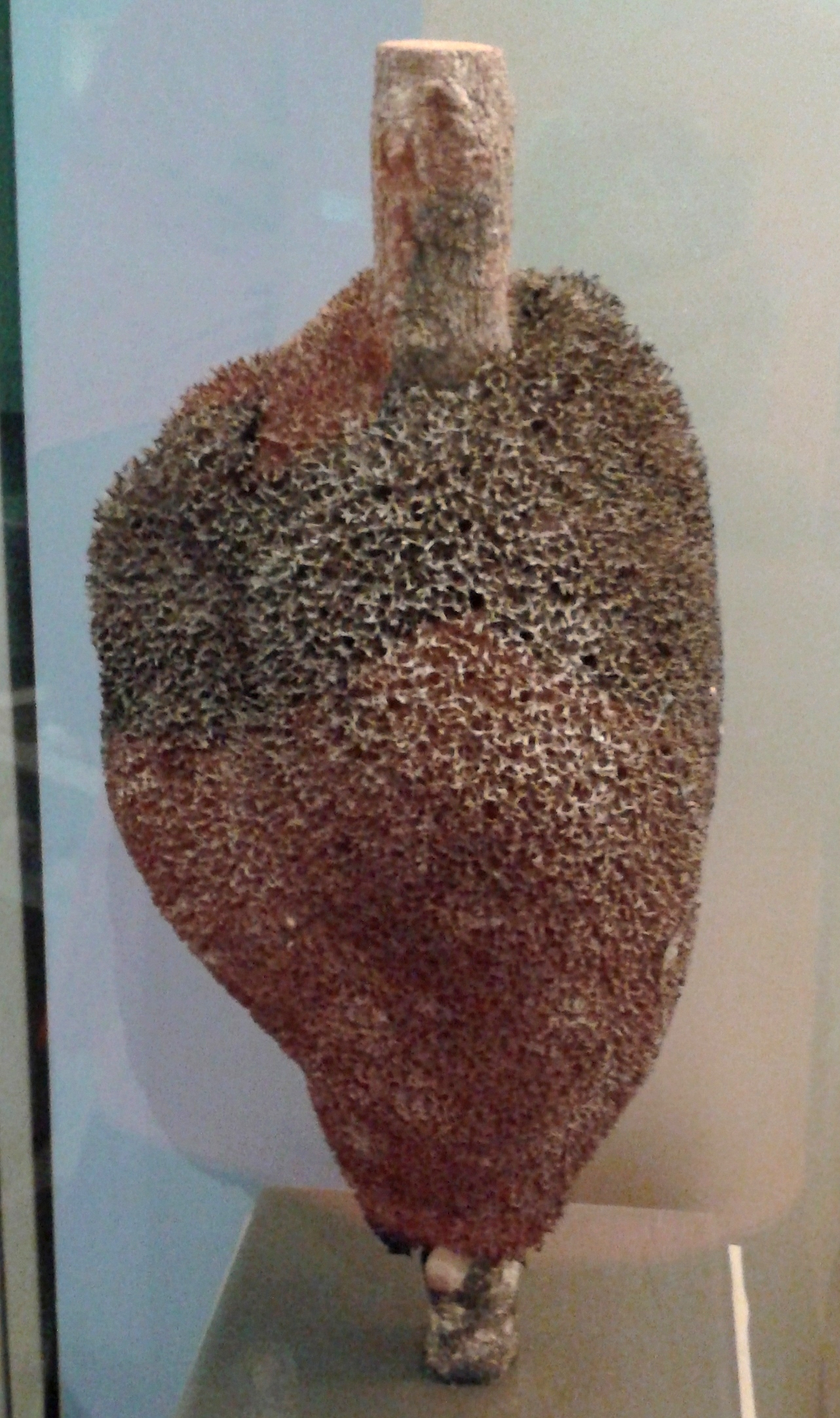
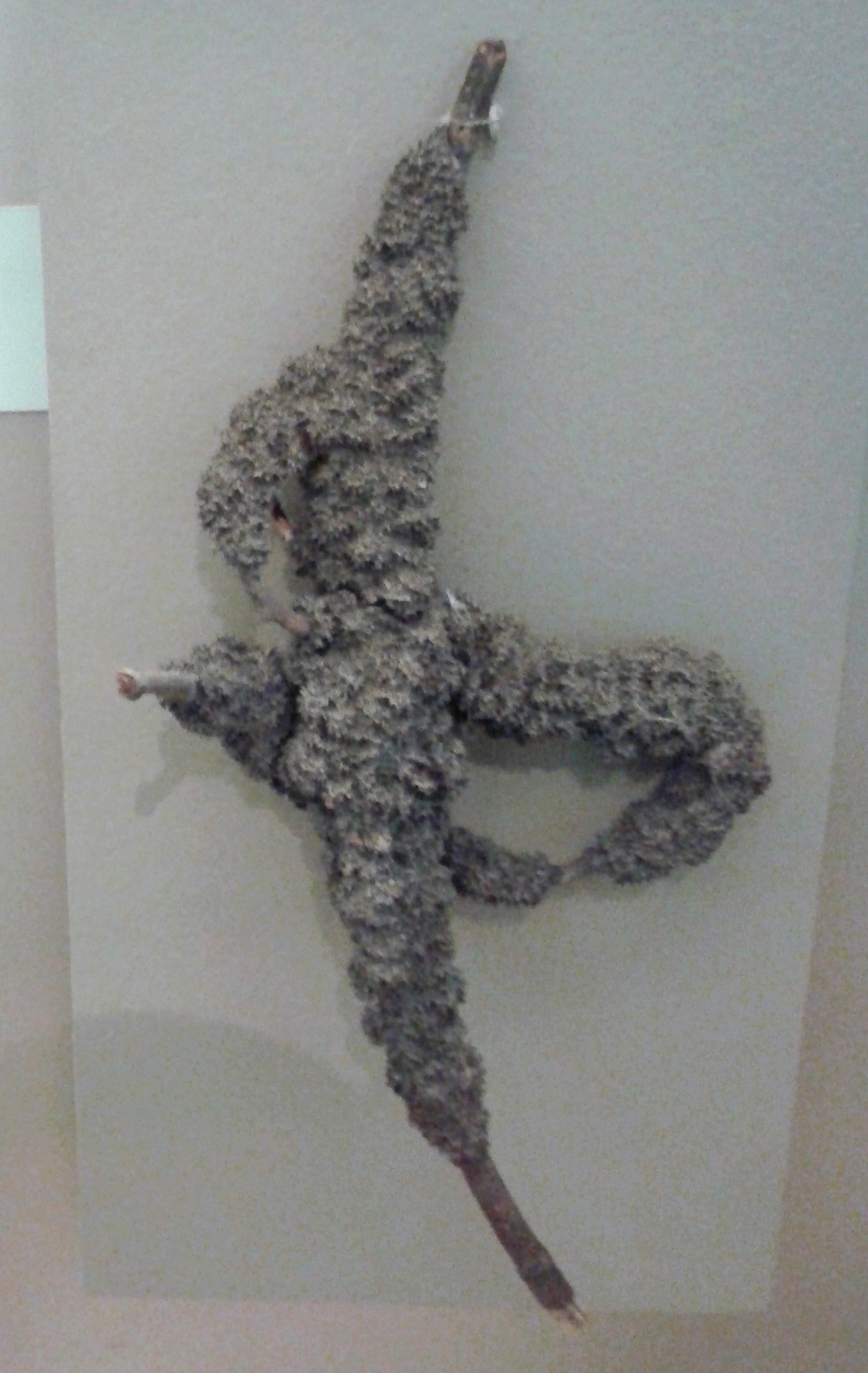
- Drulia brownii Metania spinata

Scientific classification
- Kingdom: Animalia
- Phylum: Porifera
- Class: Demospongiae
- Order: Spongillida
- Family: Metaniidae; Volkmer-Ribeiro, 1986

= Metaniidae =

Family of sponges

Metaniidae is a family of freshwater sponges, with five genera and 27 species:

- Acalle Gray, 1867
  - Acalle recurvata (Bowerbank, 1863)
- Corvomeyenia Weltner, 1913
  - Corvomeyenia carolinensis Harrison, 1971
  - Corvomeyenia epilithosa Volkmer-Ribeiro, Rosa-Barbosa & Machado, 2005
  - Corvomeyenia everetti (Mills, 1884)
  - Corvomeyenia thumi (Traxler, 1895)
- Drulia Gray, 1867
  - Drulia batesii (Bowerbank, 1863)
  - Drulia brownii (Bowerbank, 1863)
  - Drulia conifera Bonetto & Ezcurra de Drago, 1973
  - Drulia cristata (Weltner, 1895)
  - Drulia cristinae Volkmer-Ribeiro, Drago, Machado & Sabaj, 2017
  - Drulia ctenosclera Volkmer & Mothes, 1981
  - Drulia geayi (Gravier, 1899)
  - Drulia uruguayensis Bonetto & Ezcurra de Drago, 1969
- Houssayella Bonetto & Ezcurra de Drago, 1966
  - Houssayella iguazuensis Bonetto & Ezcurra de Drago, 1966
- Metania Gray, 1867
  - Metania fittkaui Volkmer-Ribeiro, 1979
  - Metania godeauxi (Brien, 1968)
  - Metania kiliani Volkmer-Ribeiro & Costa, 1992
  - Metania madagascariensis Manconi & Pronzato, 2015
  - Metania melloleitaoi Machado, 1948
  - Metania ovogemata Stanisic, 1979
  - Metania pottsi (Weltner, 1895)
  - Metania reticulata (Bowerbank, 1863)
  - Metania rhodesiana Burton, 1938
  - Metania spinata (Carter, 1881)
  - Metania subtilis Volkmer, 1979
  - Metania vesparioides (Annandale, 1908)
  - Metania vesparium (Martens, 1868)
