= Acalle (sponge) =

Scientific classification
- Kingdom: Animalia
- Phylum: Porifera
- Class: Demospongiae
- Order: Spongillida
- Family: Metaniidae
- Genus: Acalle; Gray, 1867

Genus of sponges

Acalle is a genus of freshwater sponges in the family Metaniidae.

The species of this genus are found in South America, specifically the Amazon River region of Brazil.

== Taxonomy ==
Acalle contains the following species:

- Acalle recurvata (Bowerbank, 1863)
