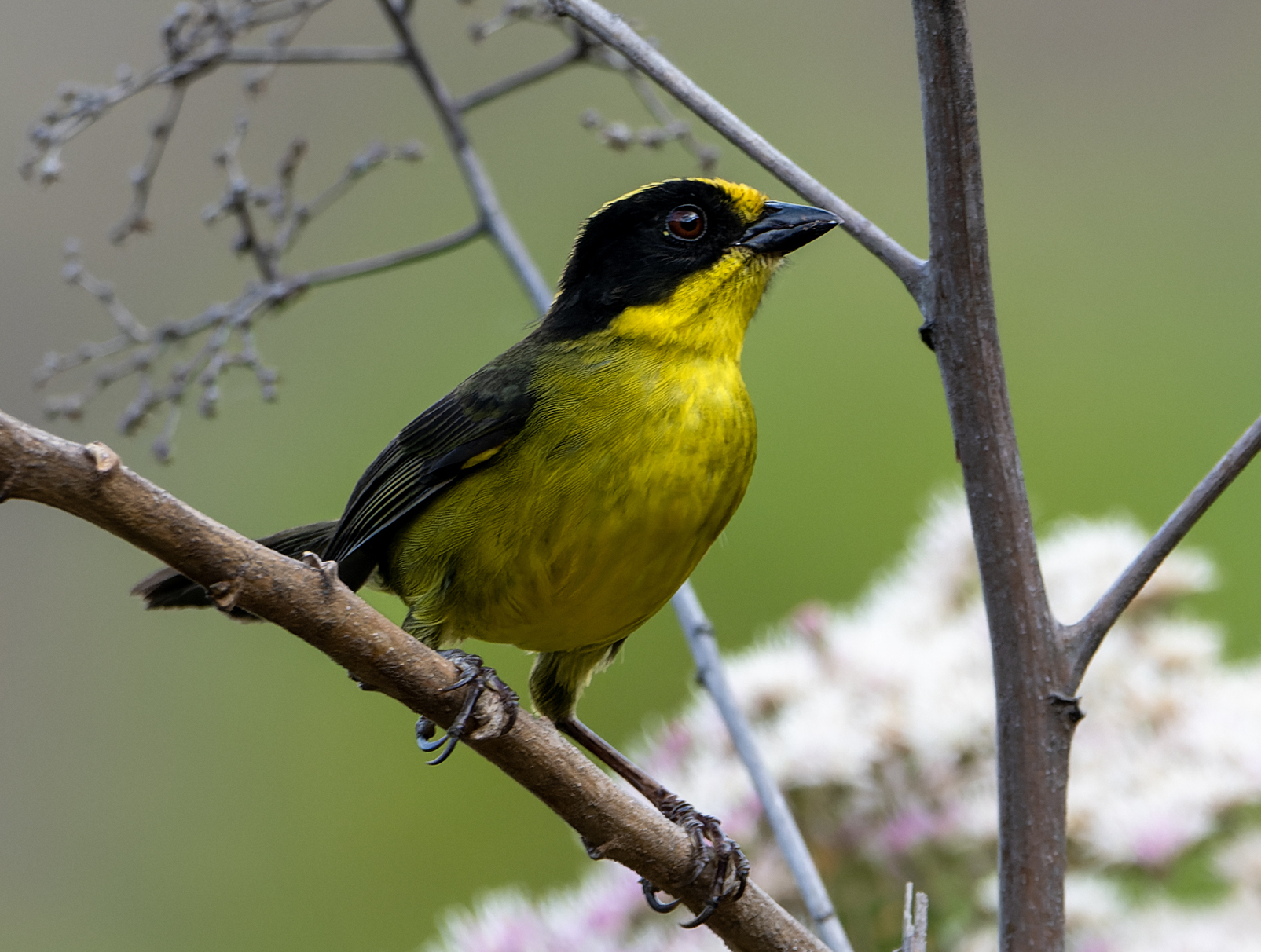
- Tricolored brush finch

Conservation status
- Least Concern (IUCN 3.1)

Scientific classification
- Kingdom: Animalia
- Phylum: Chordata
- Class: Aves
- Order: Passeriformes
- Family: Passerellidae
- Genus: Atlapetes
- Species: A. tricolor

Binomial name
- Atlapetes tricolor (Taczanowski, 1875)

= Tricolored brushfinch =

Species of bird

The tricolored brushfinch or golden-crowned brushfinch (Atlapetes tricolor) is a species of bird in the family Passerellidae, the New World sparrows. It is endemic to Peru.

== Taxonomy and systematics ==
The tricolored brushfinch was formally described in 1875 with the binomial Buarremon tricolor. In the early twentieth century genus Buarremon was merged into Atlapetes.

For a time what is now the Choco brushfinch (A. crassus), which had been described as a species, was considered a subspecies of the tricolored brushfinch. As early as 1960 an author advocated returning it to full species status. By 2012 the IOC had recognized it as a species. In 2014 BirdLife International's Handbook of the Birds of the World followed suit as did the Clements taxonomy in 2024. (Clements called it the golden-crowned brushfinch to avoid confusion with the two-subspecies predecessor.) The first version of AviList in 2025 also recognized it. However, as of February 2026 the independent South American Classification Committee has declined to recognize the split but has a proposal to do so under consideration.

The tricolored brushfinch is monotypic.

== Description ==
The tricolored brushfinch is 16 to 18 cm (6.3 to 7.1 in) long and weighs about 36 g (1.3 oz). The sexes have the same plumage. Adults have a yellow to ocraceous crown and nape and a black face. Their back is dark olive to olive-citrine and their rump and uppertail coverts are olive. Their tail is blackish and their wings dusky gray with dark olive feather edges. Their throat and underparts are yellow with a strong olive wash that is darkest on the sides, flanks, vent, and undertail coverts. They have a deep reddish brown iris, a black bill, and grayish or dusky black legs and feet. Juveniles are dark brown above and lighter brown below with a dark rufous crown.

== Distribution and habitat ==
The tricolored brushfinch is found in Peru on the eastern slope of the Andes between northern La Libertad Department and west-central Cuzco Department. It inhabits the shrubby edges and openings of humid forest, secondary forest, and open cloudforest. Sources differ on its elevational range. One says it is mostly between 1,525 and 3,050 m (5,000 and 10,000 ft) and another between 1,750 and 3,050 m (5,700 and 10,000 ft).

== Behavior ==
=== Movement ===
The tricolored brushfinch is a year-round resident.

=== Feeding ===
The tricolored brushfinch's diet has not been studied. It is known to forage up to about 10 m (35 ft) above ground, in contrast to many other brushfinches which forage mainly near the ground. It forages alone and in pairs, and seldom joins mixed-species feeding flocks.

=== Breeding ===
Some scanty evidence suggests that the tricolored brushfinch breeds between February and July. Nothing else is known about the species' breeding biology.

=== Vocalization ===
The tricolored brushfinch's song is "pleasant, 2 or 3 parts usually with 2 long, descending introductory notes followed by a more rapid series of notes". Excited pairs duet "a long chattering phrase: pi tuee-chi tu-tu-tu zzz TEW TEW TEW TEW". The species' call is "a high ti".

== Status ==
The IUCN has assessed the tricolored brushfinch as being of Least Concern. Its population size is not known and is believed to be decreasing. No immediate threats have been identified. It is considered uncommon to fairly common. It occurs in at least two national parks.
