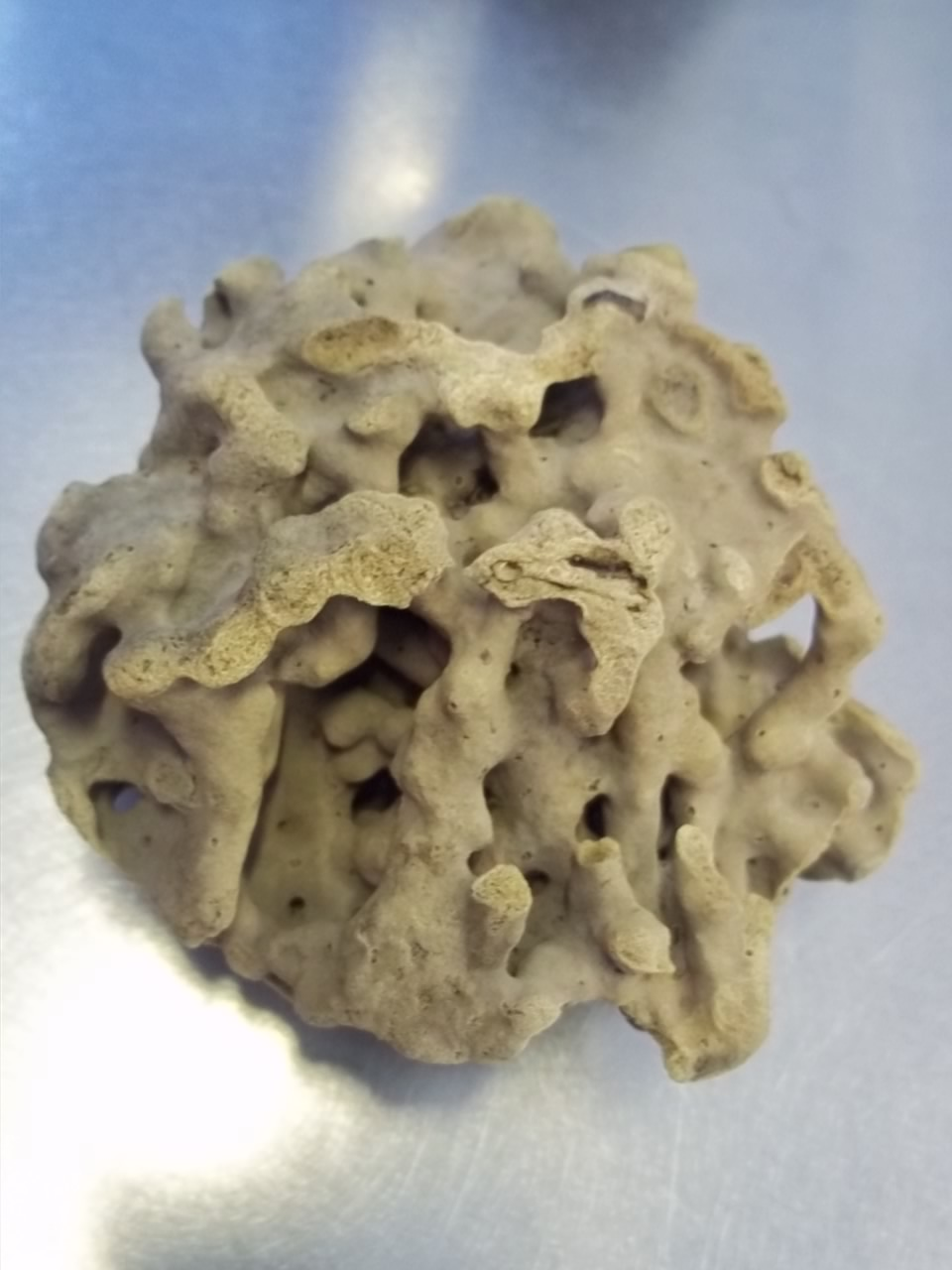
- Uruguaya corallioides

Scientific classification
- Kingdom: Animalia
- Phylum: Porifera
- Class: Demospongiae
- Order: Spongillida
- Family: Potamolepidae; Brien, 1967

Genera
- See text.

= Potamolepidae =

Family of sponges

Potamolepidae is a family of freshwater sponges, with seven genera:

== Description ==
This family contains freshwater sponges with a variety of body shapes, ranging from encrusting, massive to arborescent with irregular lobes, ridges or branches. They are smooth and range in consistency from rigid to hard and stone-like. Gemmules are located at the sponge base or strictly adhering to the substrate.

When present, the ectosomal skeleton has microscleres in the dermal membrane. These take the form of slender oxeas (have pointed ends).

The choanosomal skeleton is alveolate-reticulate. It is loose and irregular at the sponge base and notably dense at the surface and more. Spongin is very sparse. The megascleres are strongyles (have rounded ends), varying from smooth to granular or spiny with inflated ends.

== Distribution ==
Tropical areas off Africa, South America and around New Caledonia and Fiji.

== Genera ==
The following genera are recognised:

- Cherokeesia Copeland, Manconi & Pronzato, 2015
- Echinospongilla Manconi & Pronzato, 2002
- Oncosclera Volkmer-Ribeiro, 1970
- Potamolepis Marshall, 1883
- Potamophloios Brien, 1970
- Sterrastrolepis Volkmer-Ribeiro & De Rosa Barbosa, 1978
- Uruguaya Carter, 1881
