= Palaeospongillidae =

Scientific classification
- Kingdom: Animalia
- Phylum: Porifera
- Class: Demospongiae
- Order: Spongillida
- Family: †Palaeospongillidae; Volkmer-Ribeiro & Reitner, 1991

Extinct family of sponges

Palaeospongillidae is a family of extinct sponges with three genera and three species:

- †Eospongilla Dunagan, 1999
  - †Eospongilla morrisonensis Dunagan, 1999
- †Lutetiospongilla Richter & Wuttke, 1999
  - †Lutetiospongilla heili Ritcher & Wuttke, 1999
- †Palaeospongilla Ott & Volkheimer, 1972
  - †Palaeospongilla chubutensis Ott & Volkheimer, 1972
