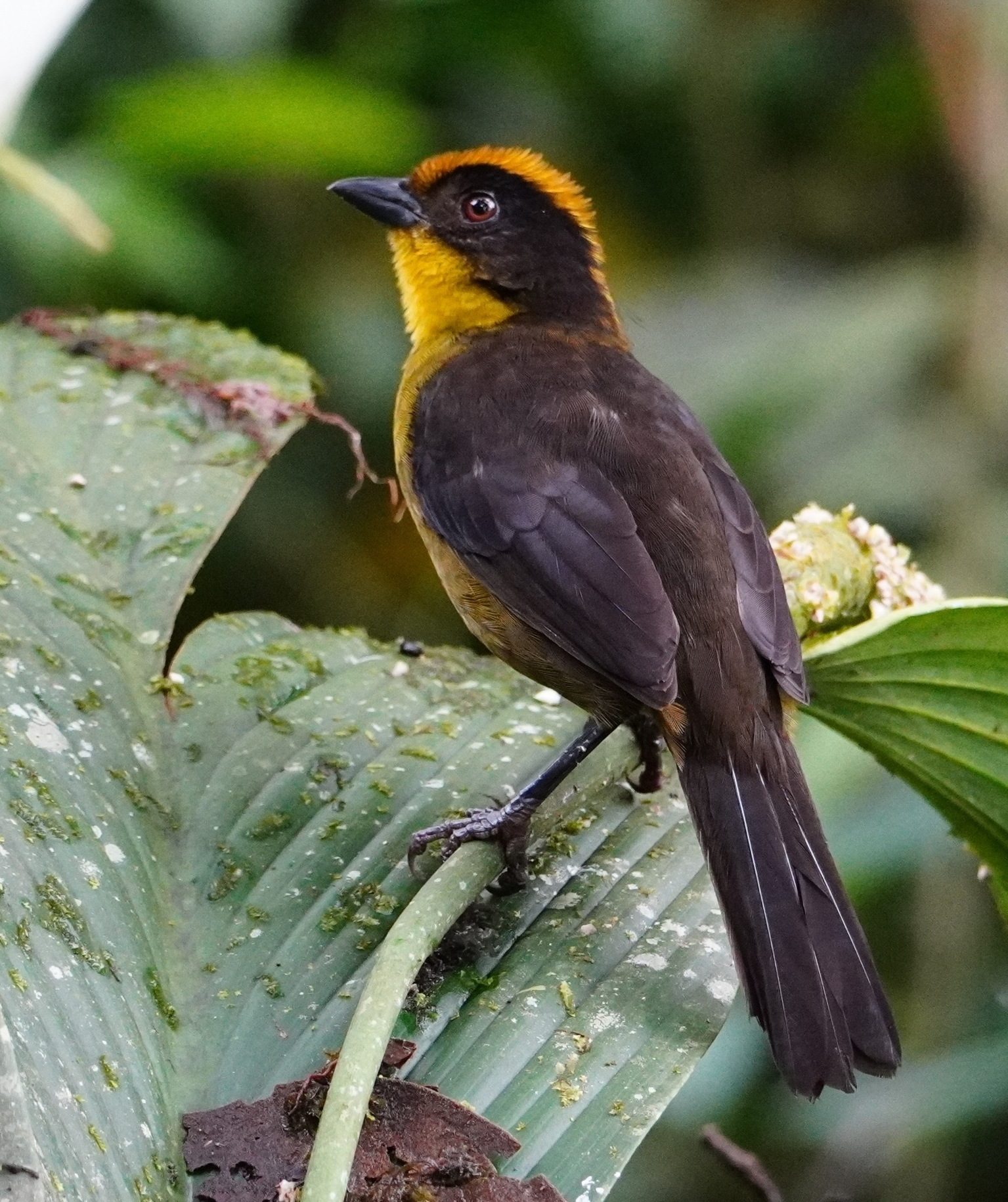

Conservation status
- Least Concern (IUCN 3.1)

Scientific classification
- Kingdom: Animalia
- Phylum: Chordata
- Class: Aves
- Order: Passeriformes
- Family: Passerellidae
- Genus: Atlapetes
- Species: A. crassus

Binomial name
- Atlapetes crassus Bangs, 1908

= Choco brushfinch =

Species of bird

The Choco brushfinch (Atlapetes crassus) is a species of bird in the family Passerellidae, the New World sparrows. It is found in Colombia and Ecuador.

== Taxonomy and systematics ==
The Choco brushfinch was formally described in 1908 with its current binomial Atlapetes crassus. For a time it was considered a subspecies of the tricolored brushfinch (Atlapetes tricolor). As early as 1960 an author advocated returning it to full species status. By 2012 the IOC had recognized it as a species. In 2014 BirdLife International's Handbook of the Birds of the World followed suit as did the Clements taxonomy in 2024. The first version of AviList in 2025 also recognized it. However, as of February 2026 the independent South American Classification Committee has declined to recognize the split but has a proposal to do so under consideration.

The Choco brushfinch is monotypic.

== Description ==
The Choco brushfinch is 16 to 18 cm (6.3 to 7.1 in) long and weighs 29.5 to 40 g (1.0 to 1.4 oz). The sexes have the same plumage. Adults have a tawny-golden crown and nape and a black face. Their back is dark olive to dark gray and their rump and uppertail coverts are olive. Their tail is dusky blackish and their wings dusky gray with dark olive feather edges. Their throat and underparts are bright yellow with an olive wash on the sides, flanks, vent, and undertail coverts. They have a deep reddish brown iris, a long, stout black bill, and grayish or dusky black legs and feet. Juveniles are dark brown above and lighter brown below with a rufous crown.

== Distribution and habitat ==
The Choco brushfinch is found on the western slope of the Andes from northern Antioquia Department in northern Colombia south to western Cotopaxi Province in northern Ecuador. It also is found intermittently further south in Ecuador between eastern Guayas Province and El Oro Province. It inhabits open cloud forest and the undergrowth of openings in and edges of humid forest and secondary woodland. Sources differ on its elevational range. One says it is from 600 to 2,300 m (2,000 to 7,500 ft) with reports from as low as 300 m (1,000 ft) in Colombia and as high as 3,100 m (10,200 ft) in Ecuador. Field guides to the birds of the two countries place it between 800 and 2,000 m (2,600 and 6,600 ft) in Colombia and mostly between 600 and 1,800 m (2,000 and 5,900 ft) in Ecuador.

== Behavior ==
=== Movement ===
The Choco brushfinch is a year-round resident.

=== Feeding ===
Little is known about the choco brushfinch's diet. It is known to forage up to about 10 m (35 ft) above ground, in contrast to many other brushfinches which forage mainly near the ground. It forages alone, in pairs, or as a member of a mixed-species feeding flock.

=== Breeding ===
Little is known about the Choco brushfinch's breeding biology. Observers have reported nest-building in Colombia in November, February, and May; eggs in April; and fledglings in June and July. A reported nest was a thick cup placed near the ground; it contained one white egg with dusky spots.

=== Vocalization ===
The Choco brushfinch's song is a "lively phrase lasting some 2‒3 seconds that is repeated (with or without variations) every few seconds...transcribed as tzit-tzit-tzit-tju-tju-tju-tju-tjrrrr or seeuwee swee swit-swit-swit". Its call is a "high-pitched short staccato tsit". The species sings mostly at dawn and the early morning, typically from a high perch.

== Status ==
The IUCN has assessed the Choco brushfinch as being of Least Concern. Its population size is not known and is believed to be decreasing. No immediate threats have been identified. It is considered fairly common in Colombia and locally common in Ecuador. It occurs in public and private protected areas in both countries.
