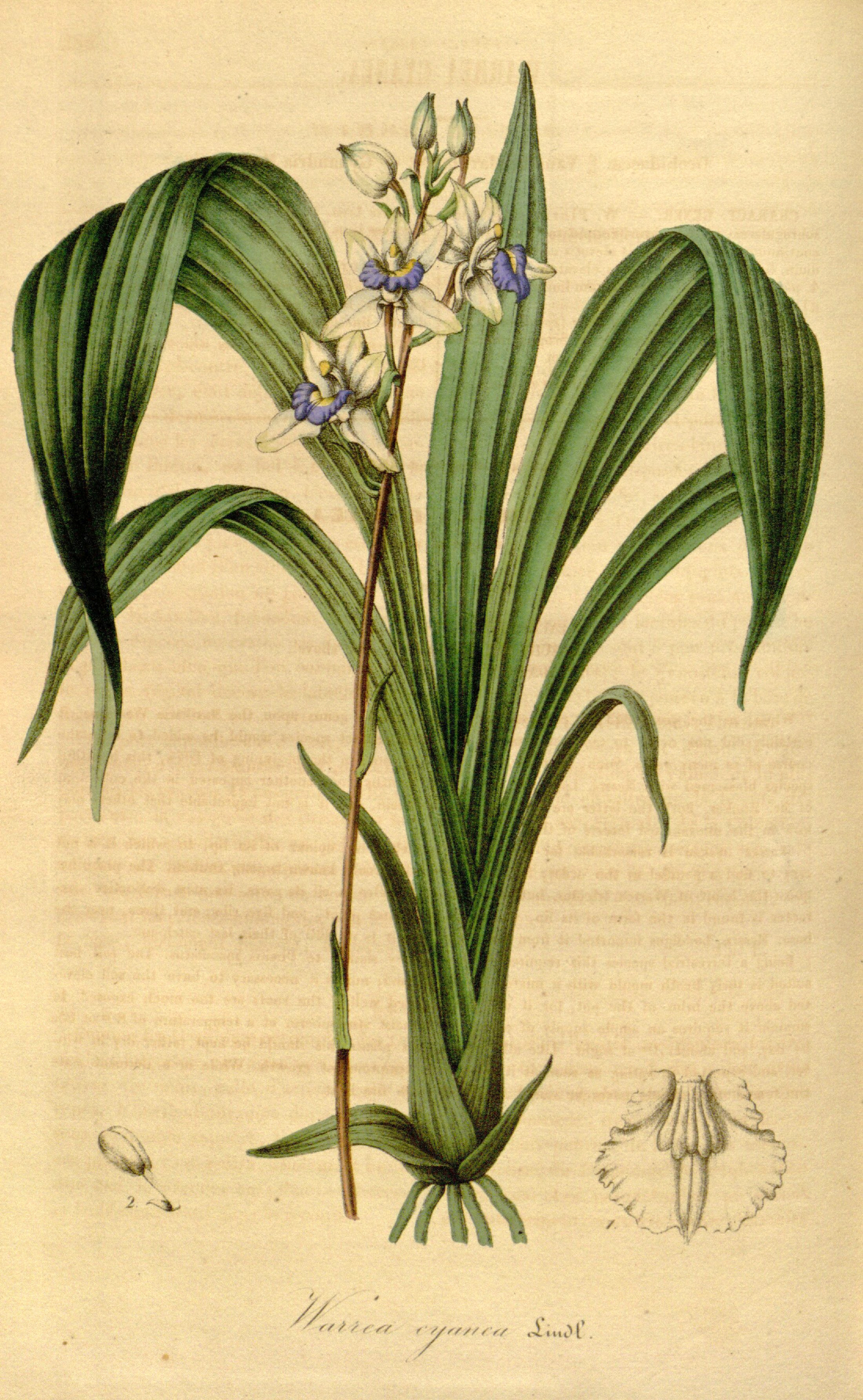
- Aganisia cyanea from "Flore des serres et des jardins de l’Europe", 1845

Scientific classification
- Kingdom: Plantae
- Clade: Tracheophytes
- Clade: Angiosperms
- Clade: Monocots
- Order: Asparagales
- Family: Orchidaceae
- Subfamily: Epidendroideae
- Tribe: Cymbidieae
- Subtribe: Zygopetalinae
- Genus: Aganisia; Lindl.

Type species
- Aganisia pulchella Lindl.

Species
- See text

Synonyms
- Acacallis Lindl.; Kochiophyton Schltr. ex Cogn. in C.F.P.von Martius

= Aganisia =

Genus of orchids

Aganisia is a small South American genus in the orchid family (Orchidaceae), subfamily Epidendroideae.

The genus was probably named after the Greek word ‘agnos’ (gratitude), perhaps referring to the sweet scent of its flowers. Lindley did not explain the source of the name in his species description.

These dwarf, epiphytic climbing orchids occur in mountainous or savanna forests and alongside rivers in Trinidad, Brazil, Colombia, Venezuela, Guyana, French Guiana, Suriname and Peru.

Aganisia produce pseudobulbs and small flowers produced from a creeping rhizome. These flowers generally reach 4 cm (1.6 in) in width. Their color varies from a rose-tinted violet to a blue-tinted violet. The flower has a short column foot and an elongate stipe.

They are rarely cultivated.

== Species ==
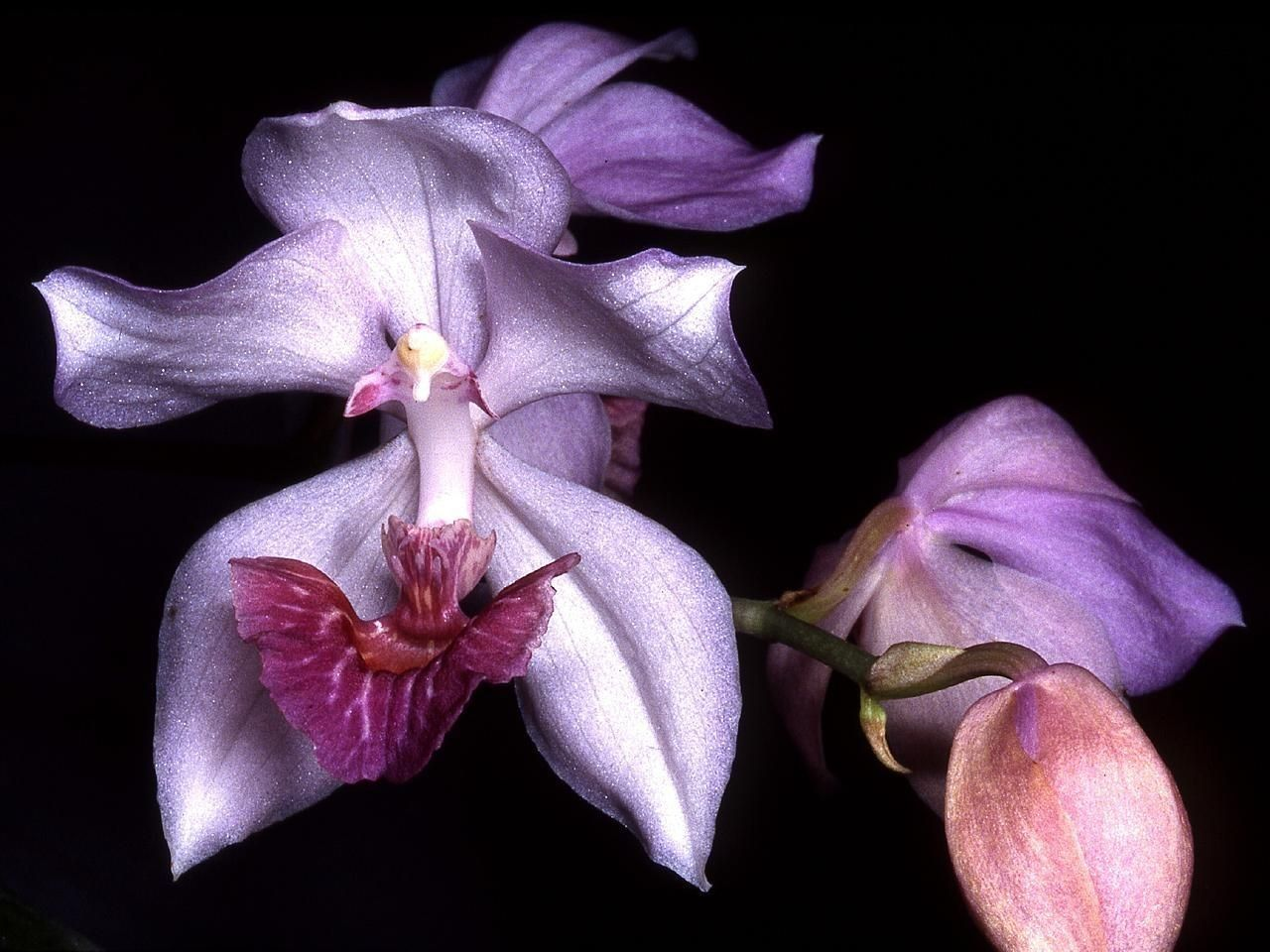
Aganisia cyanea

Four species are currently recognized (May 2014):

- Aganisia cyanea (Lindl.) Rchb.f. - Blue orchid - Venezuela, Colombia, Peru, Brazil
- Aganisia fimbriata Rchb.f. - Brazil, Venezuela, Colombia, Peru, Guyana, Suriname
- Aganisia pulchella Lindl. - Trinidad, French Guiana, Suriname, Guyana, Venezuela, Brazil

Synonyms

- Aganisia rosariana (V.P.Castro & J.B.F.Silva) F.Barros & L.R.S.Guim.; valid as A. cyanea - Brazil (Rondônia)

== Intergeneric Hybrids ==
- xDownsara. = Aganisia x Batemannia x Otostylis x Zygosepalum
- xHamelwellsara = Aganisia x Batemannianax Otostylis x Zygopetalum x Zygosepalum
- xMauriceara = Aganisia x Batemanniana x Pabstia x Promenaea x Otostylis x Zygopetalum x Zygosepalum
- xOtonisia = Aganisia x Otostylis
- xZygonisia = Aganisia x Zygopetalum
