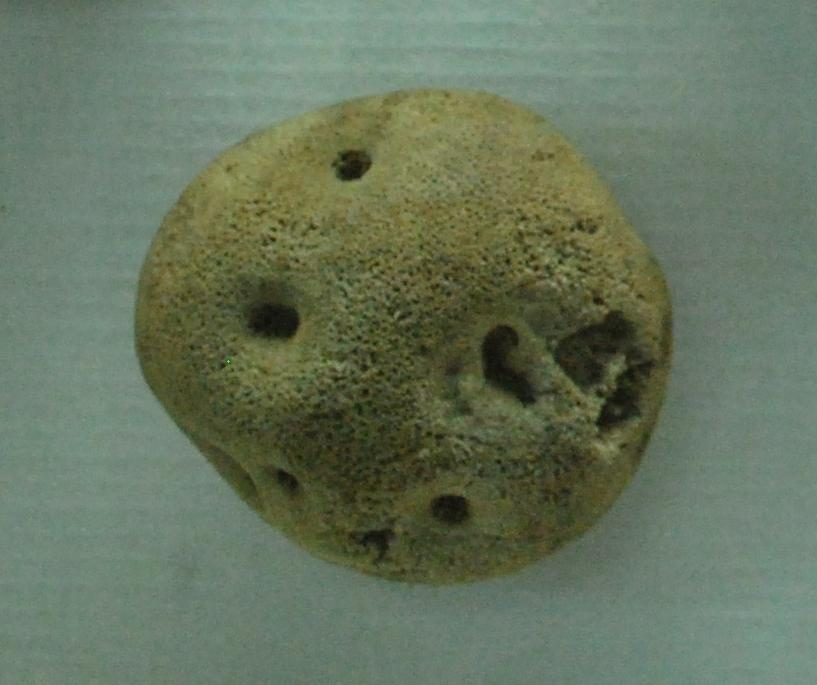
- Ochridaspongia rotunda

Scientific classification
- Domain: Eukaryota
- Kingdom: Animalia
- Phylum: Porifera
- Class: Demospongiae
- Order: Spongillida
- Family: Malawispongiidae; Manconi & Pronzato, 2002

= Malawispongiidae =

Family of sponges

Malawispongiidae is a family of freshwater sponges found in the ancient lakes of Malawi, Tanganyika, Kinneret, Ohrid and Poso. As presently defined, the family is polyphyletic.

== Genera and species ==
The family contains five genera and six species:

- Cortispongilla (Lake Kinneret, but validity of this genus is questionable)
  - Cortispongilla barroisi (Topsent, 1892)
- Malawispongia (Lake Malawi)
  - Malawispongia echinoides Brien, 1972
- Ochridaspongia (Lake Ohrid)
  - Ochridaspongia interlithonis Arndt, 1937
  - Ochridaspongia rotunda Arndt, 1937
- Pachydictyum (Lake Poso)
  - Pachydictyum globosum Weltner, 1901
- Spinospongilla (Lake Tanganyika)
  - Spinospongilla polli Brien, 1974
