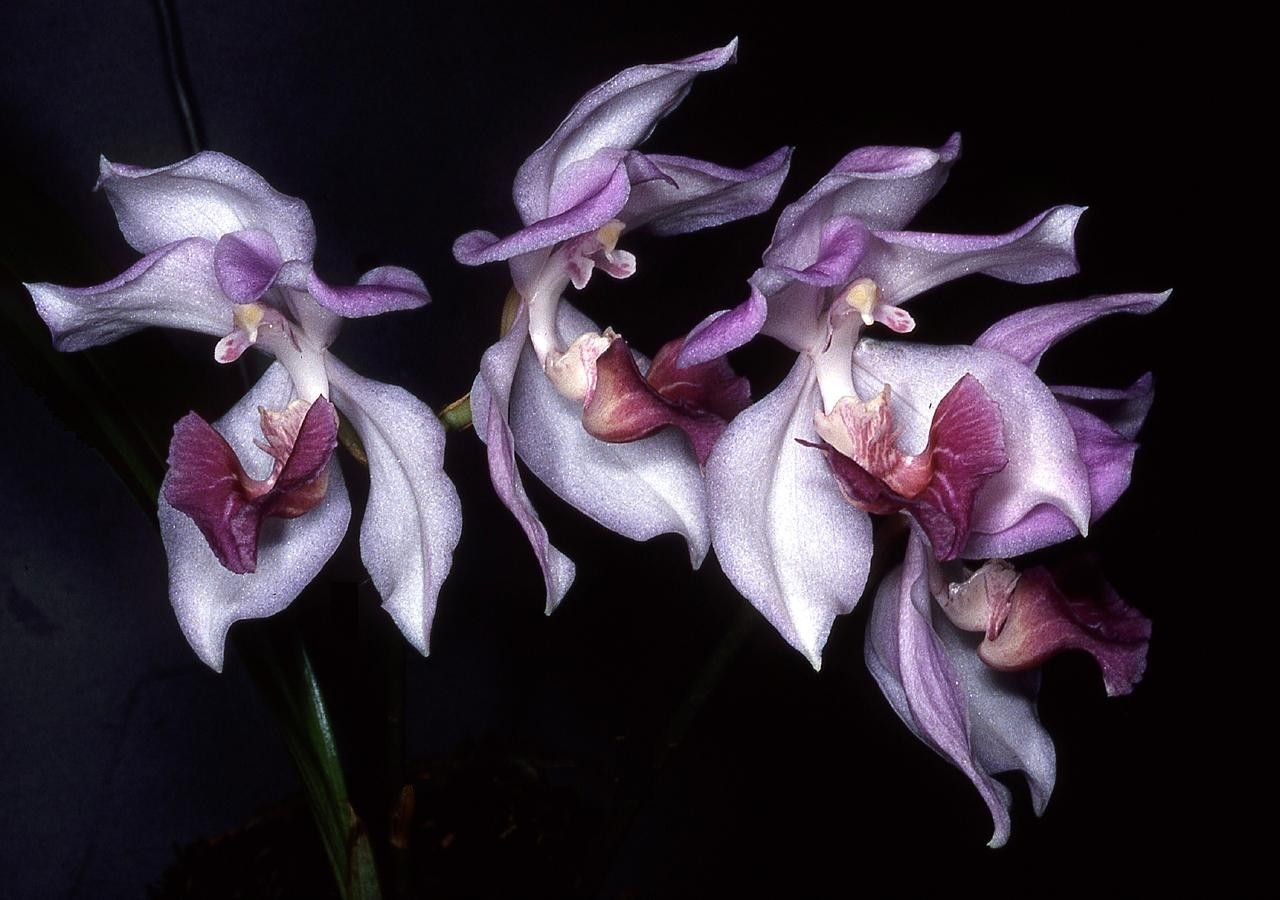

Scientific classification
- Kingdom: Plantae
- Clade: Tracheophytes
- Clade: Angiosperms
- Clade: Monocots
- Order: Asparagales
- Family: Orchidaceae
- Subfamily: Epidendroideae
- Genus: Aganisia
- Species: A. cyanea

Binomial name
- Aganisia cyanea (Lindl.) Rchb.f. (1876)

Synonyms
- Acacallis cyanea Lindl. (1853) (Basionym); Warrea cinerea Benth. (1881); Aganisia tricolor N.E. Br. (1885); Kochiophyton negrense Schltr. ex Cogn. (1906); Kochiophyton caeruleum Hoehne (1910); Acacallis hoehnei Schltr. (1918); Acacallis caerulea (Hoehne) Hoehne in A.J.de Sampaio (1923), illegitimate; Acacallis cyanea f. alba Roeth & O. Gruss (2006); Aganisia rosariana (V.P.Castro & J.B.F.Silva) F.Barros & L.R.S.Guim.

= Aganisia cyanea =

Species of plant

Aganisia cyanea (formerly Acacallis cyanea) is a showy species of orchid native to Colombia, Venezuela, Peru, Ecuador, and Brazil and widely cultivated elsewhere as an ornamental. It is remarkable because some cultivars of this species produce blue flowers, the color blue being quite rare among the orchids. They are considered difficult to maintain in cultivation without a controlled growing environment.

== Biology ==
Aganisia cyanea is found in very wet, lowland rain forests in northern South America growing on lower sections of the trunks of large trees. The plants can be submerged under water during monsoons for several weeks due to flooding in habitat with no apparent harm.

The plants grow from a creeping rhizome with inter-spaced pseudobulbs with one apical, usually pleated leaf. These plants bloom from the base of the pseudobulbs, and produce a raceme of up to 10 flowers.

The flowers of these plants have a metallic, almost surreal appearance and appear to be made of bluish metal. This is very striking. The flowers take on a more bluish cast when not exposed to direct sunlight.

== Cultivation ==
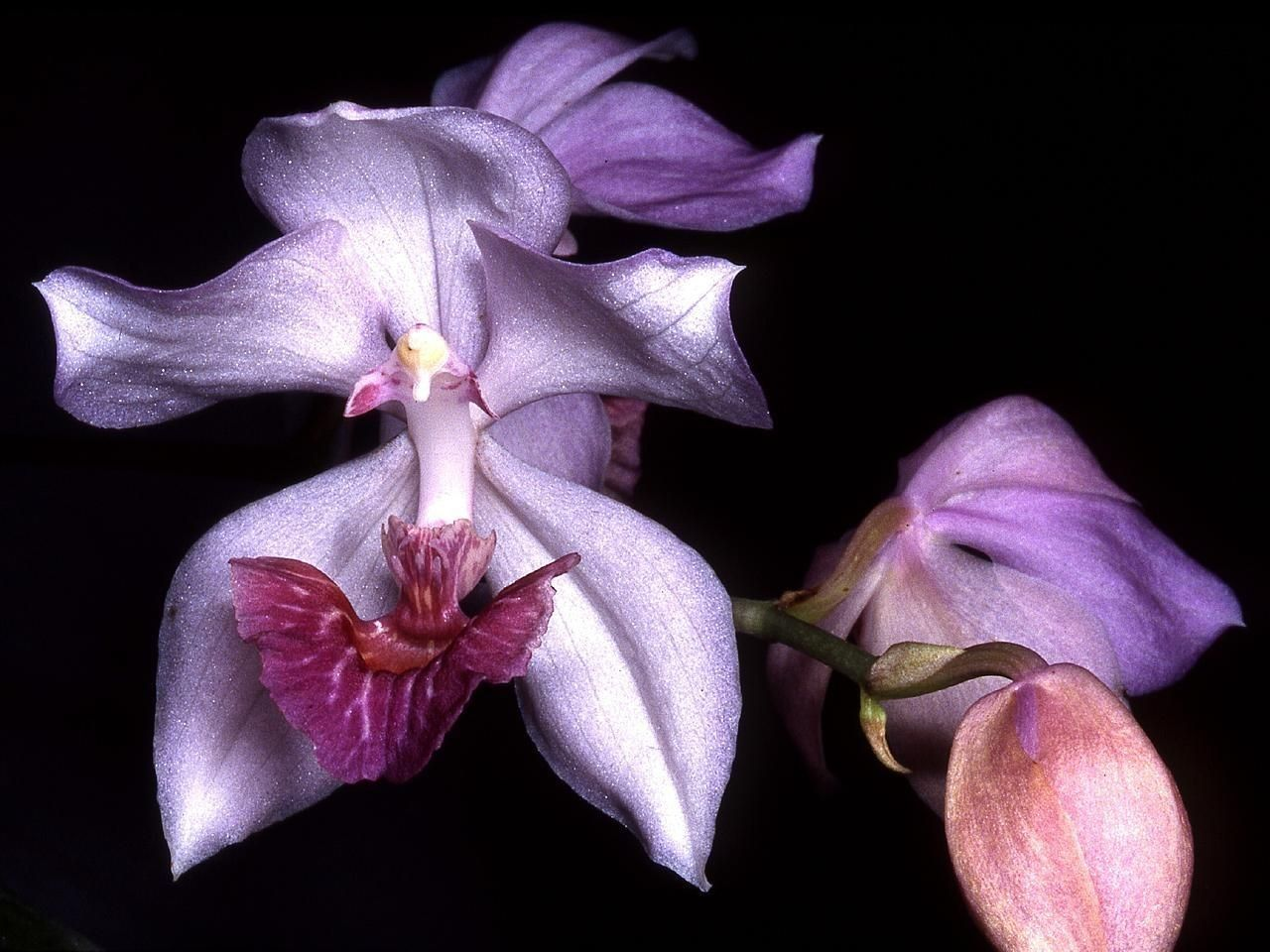

In cultivation, they are best accommodated on tree fern or cork bark slabs mounted bare root and given high humidity and abundant water and feeding year round, and moderate shade. They prefer moderate to warm temperatures.

The species is much sought after in cultivation because of its blue metallic flowers. These plants are protected under CITES II and local and regional laws and should not be removed or disturbed in habitat.

The plants are available commercially from flasked seedlings of varieties that are amenable to cultivation and these plants are easily obtainable.

== Flora and flowers ==
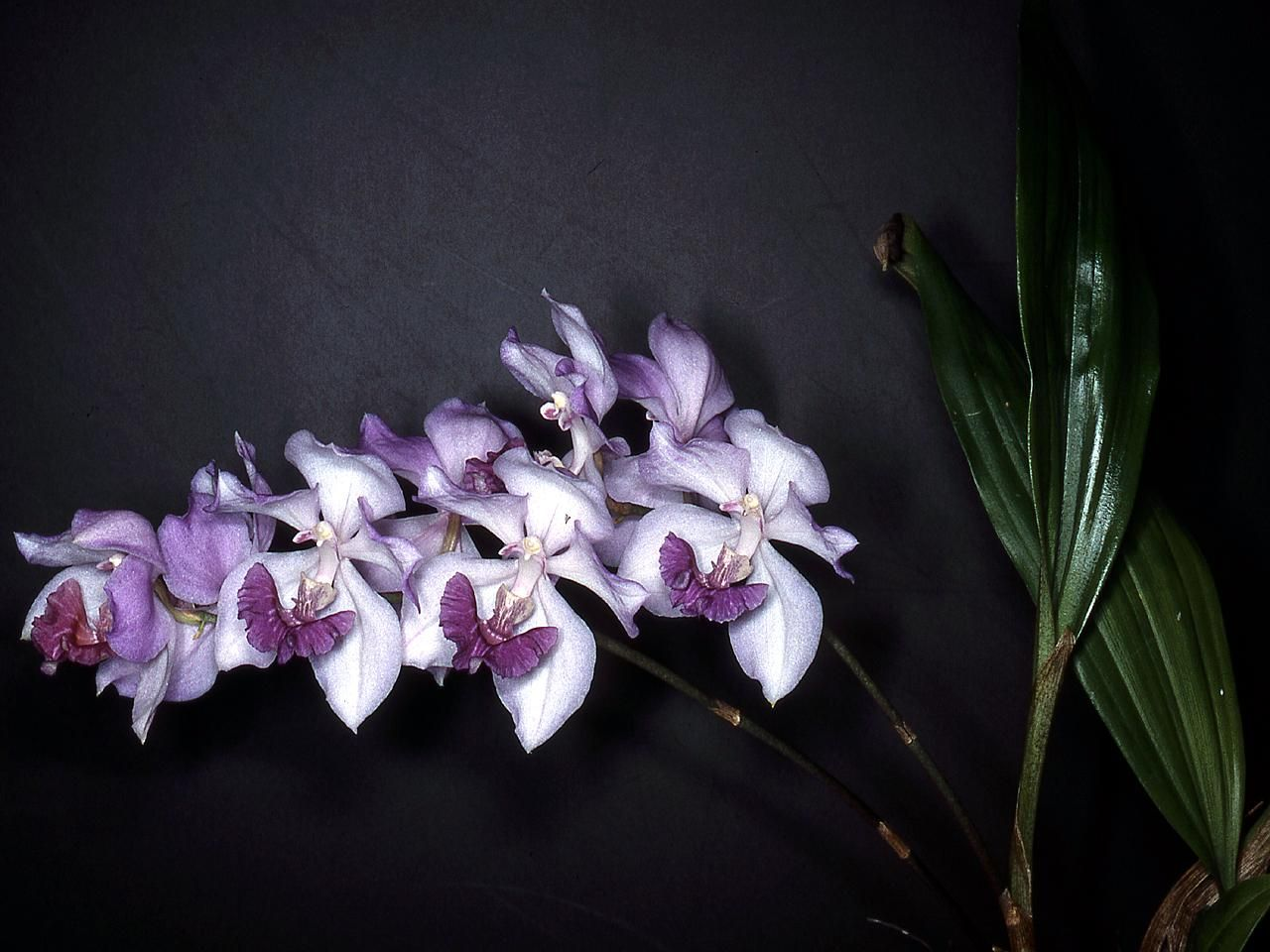
Aganisia cyanea

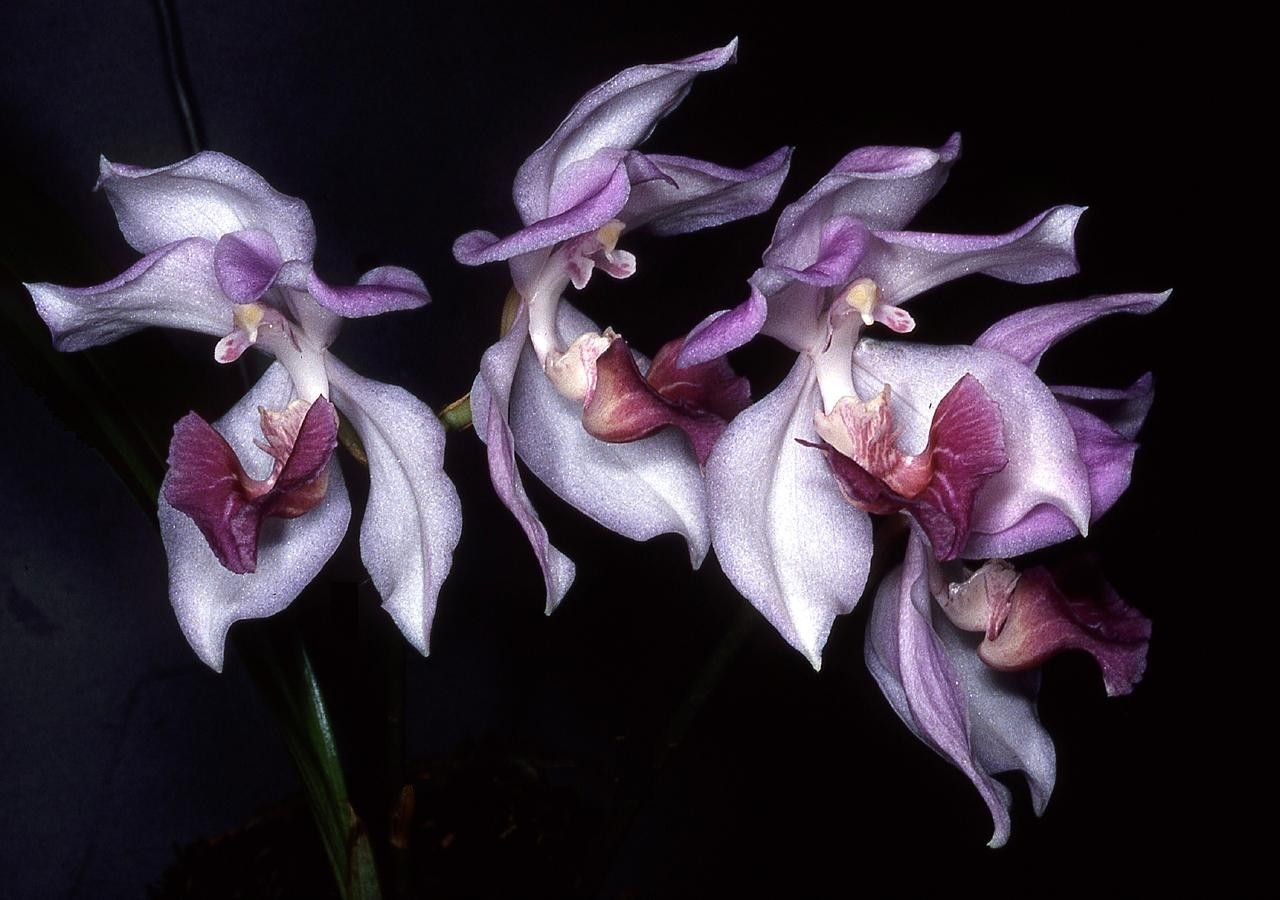
Aganisia cyanea

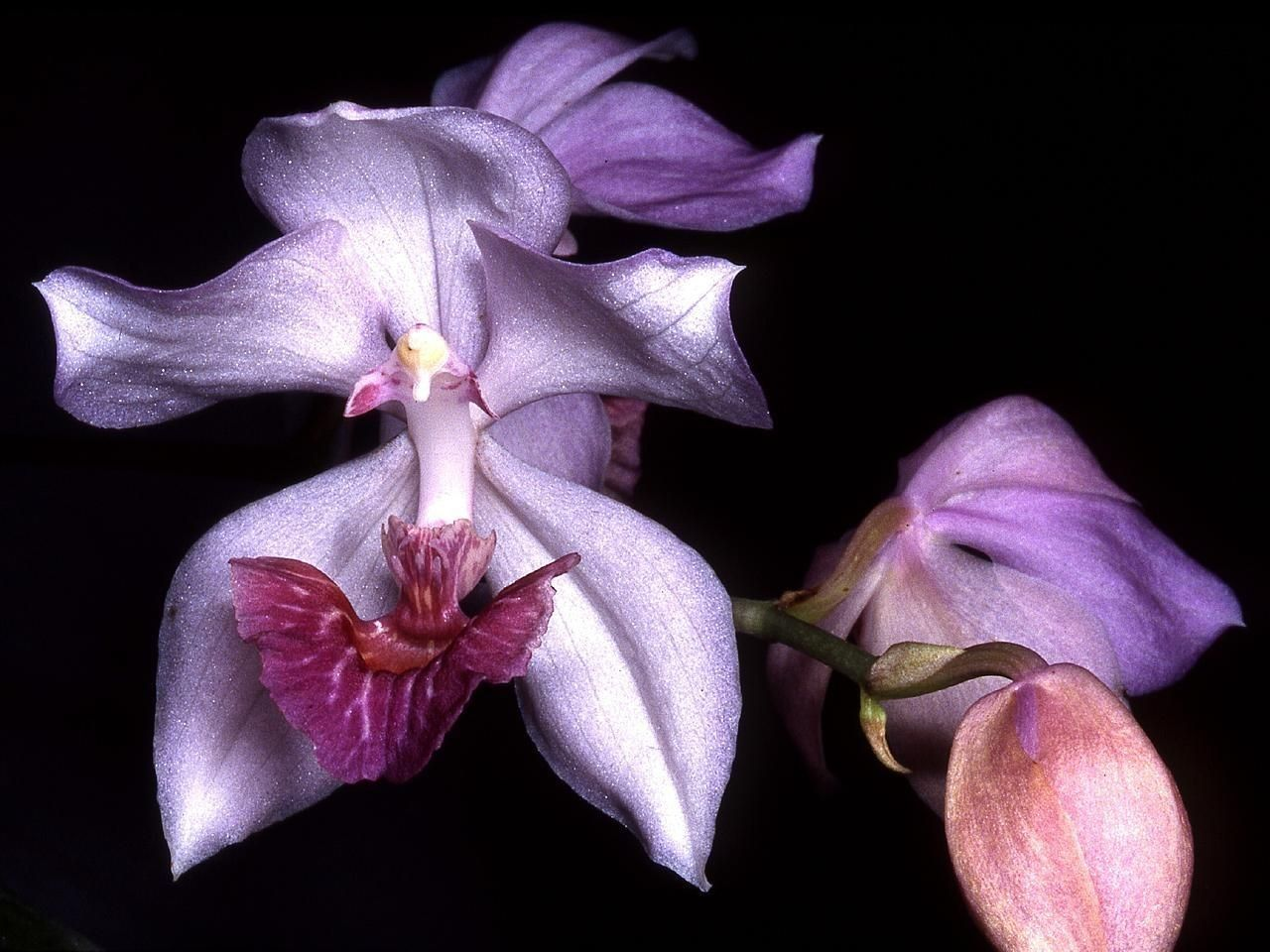
Aganisia cyanea

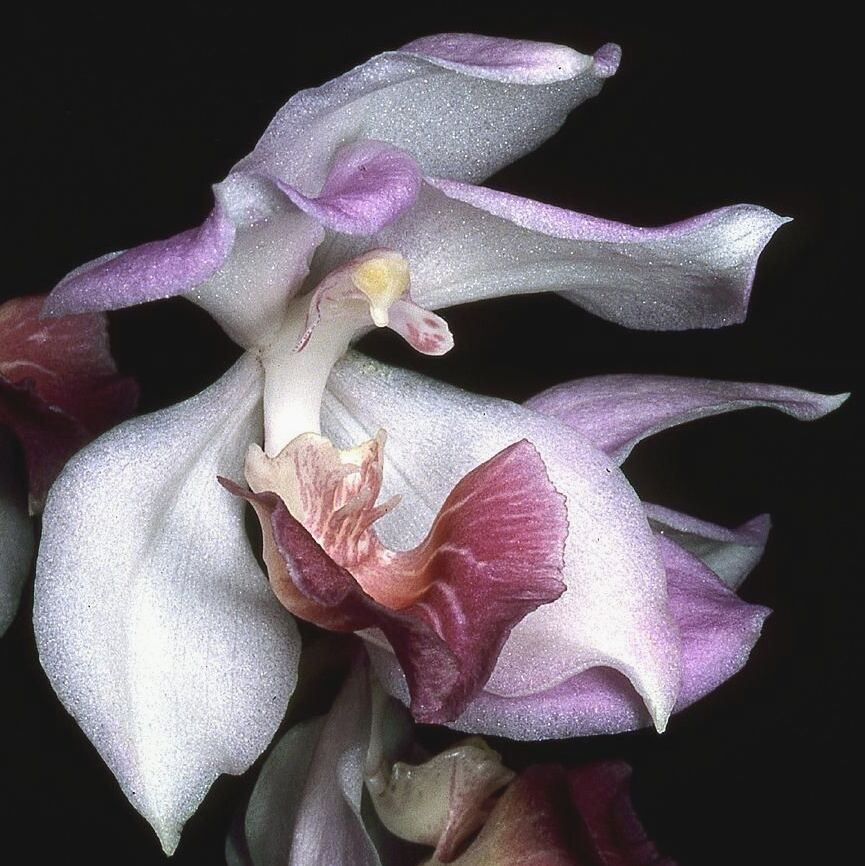
Aganisia cyanea

== Illustrations ==
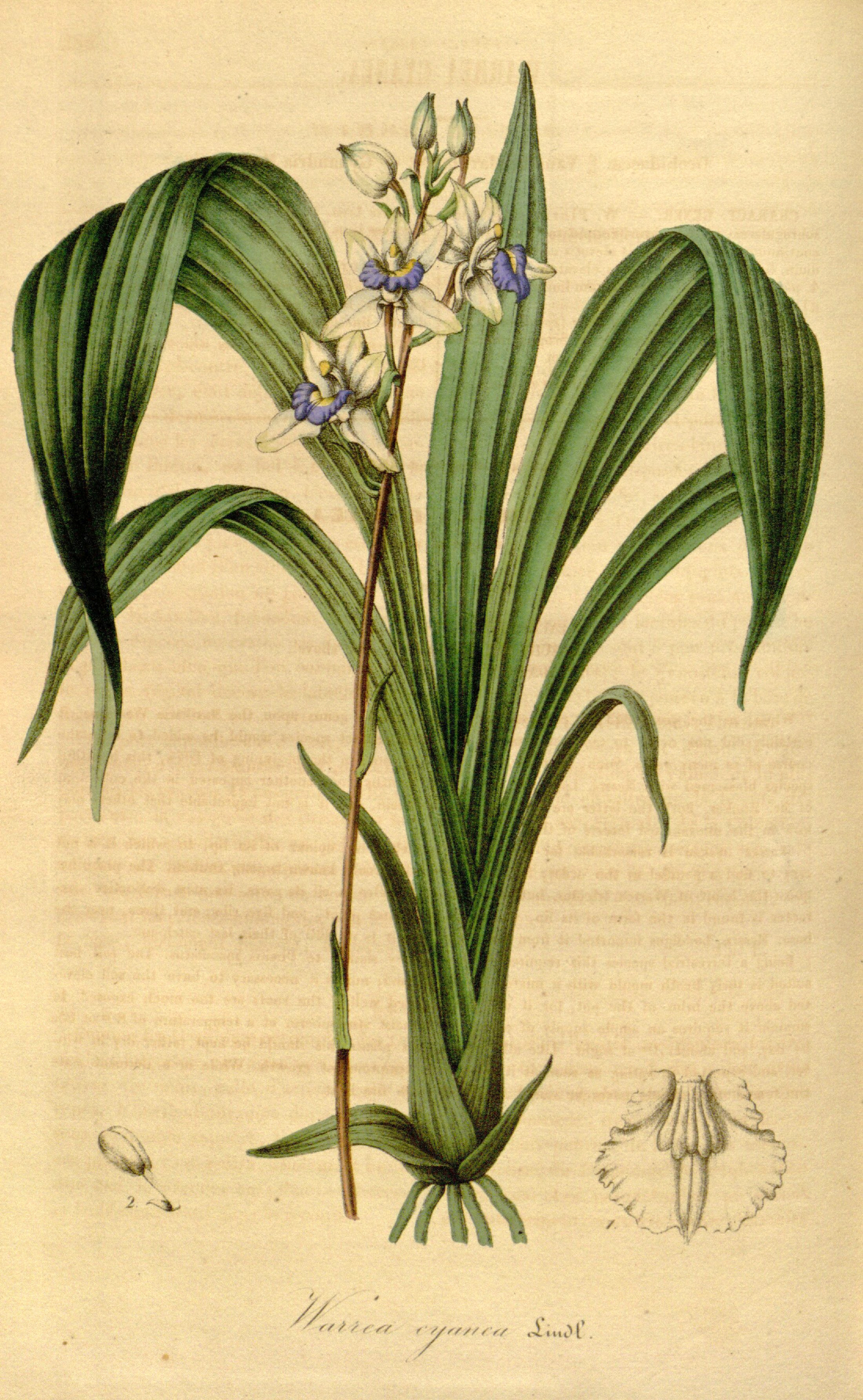
Aganisia cyanea
Illustration in:
Charles Lemaire and others:
"Flore des serres et des jardins de l'Europe",
volume 1
(1845)

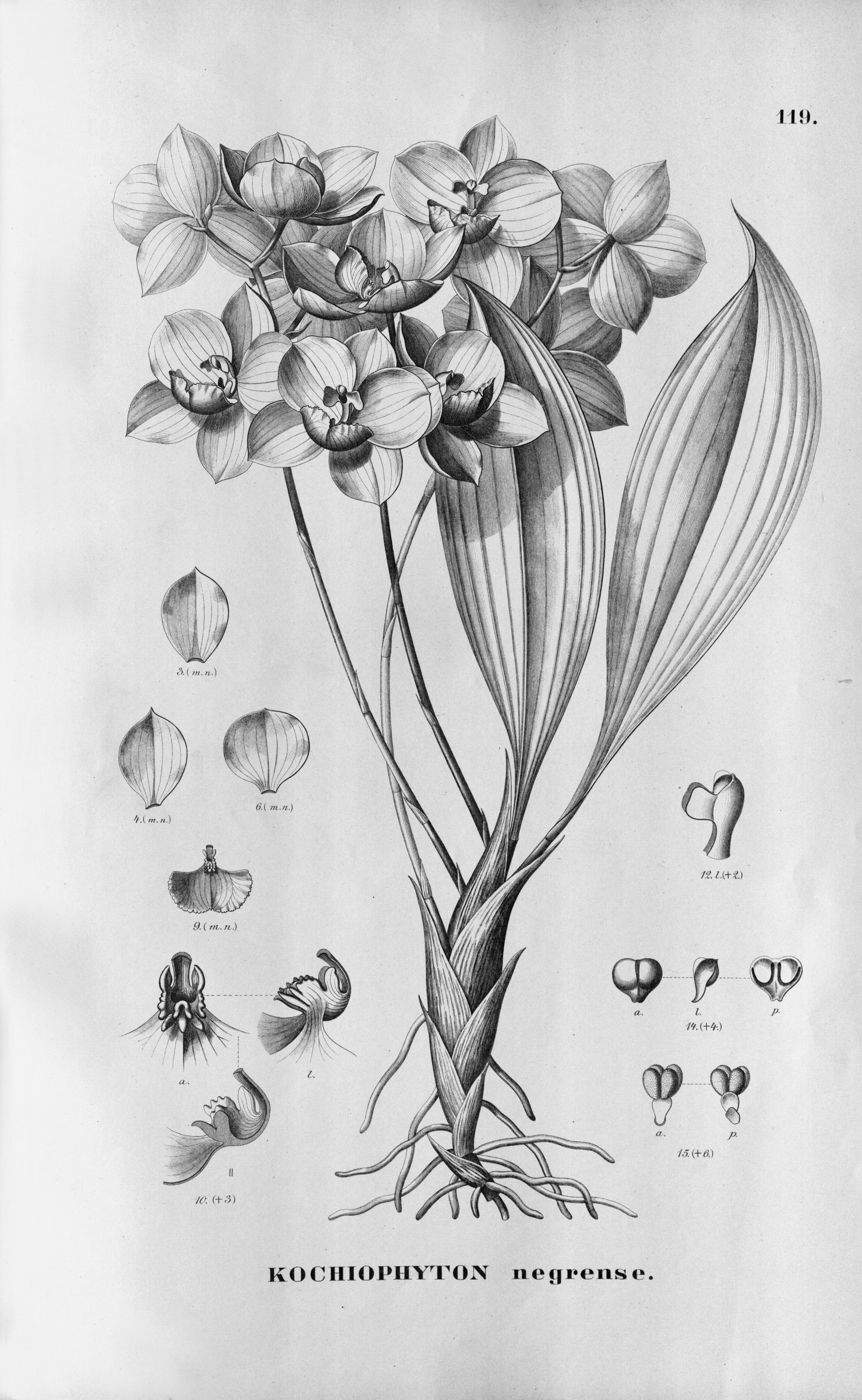
Aganisia cyanea
(as syn.
Kochiophyton negrense)
Illustration in:
Flora Brasiliensis vol. 3 pt. 6 tab. 119
(1904-1906)

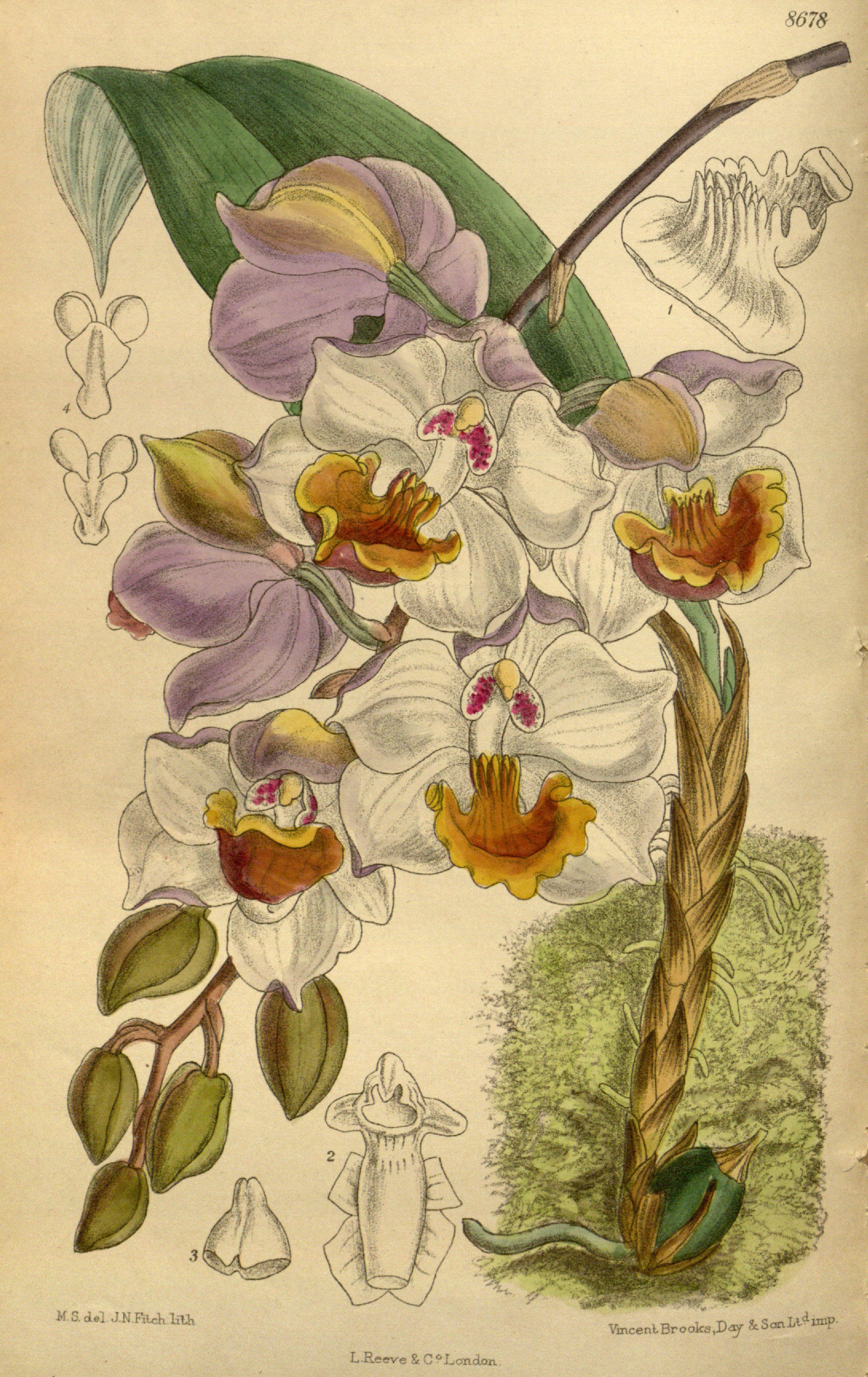
