= Metschnikowiidae =

Scientific classification
- Kingdom: Animalia
- Phylum: Porifera
- Class: Demospongiae
- Order: Spongillida
- Family: Metschnikowiidae

Family of sponges

Metschnikowiidae is a family of sponges belonging to the order Spongillida.

Genera:

- Metschnikowia Grimm, 1876
