= La Libertad Department =

- La Libertad Department, El Salvador
- La Libertad Department, Peru
- La Libertad Department, North Peru, one of four departments of the ancient Republic of North Peru
