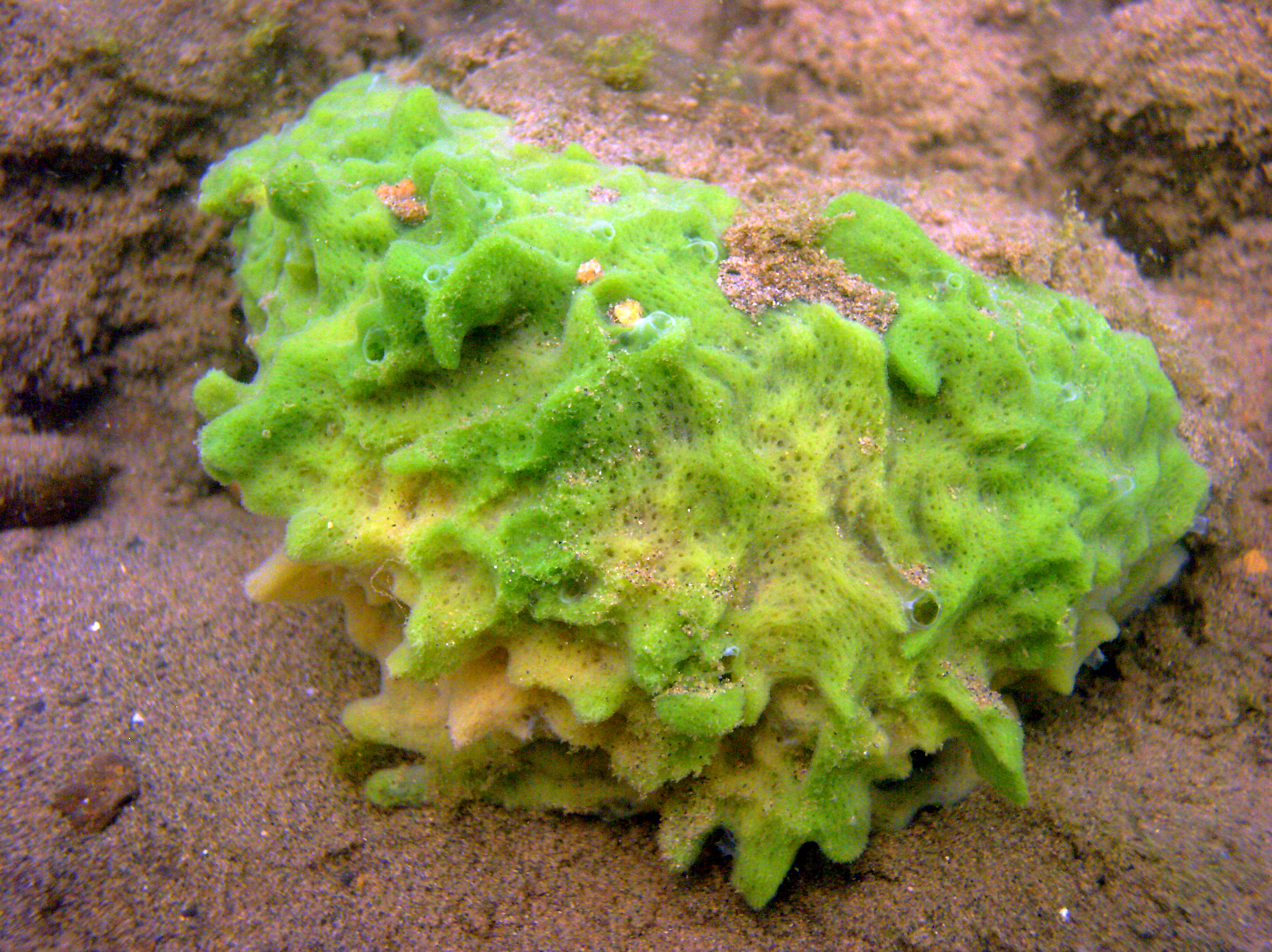
- An individual of the type genus, Spongilla

Scientific classification
- Kingdom: Animalia
- Phylum: Porifera
- Class: Demospongiae
- Subclass: Heteroscleromorpha
- Order: Spongillida; Manconi & Pronzato, 2002

Families
- Lubomirskiidae Weltner, 1895; Malawispongiidae Manconi & Pronzato, 2002; Metaniidae Volkmer-Ribeiro, 1986; Metschnikowiidae Czerniavsky, 1880; †Palaeospongillidae Volkmer-Ribeiro & Reitner, 1991; Potamolepidae Brien, 1967; Spongillidae Gray, 1867

= Spongillida =

Order of sponges

Spongillida is an order of sponges in the subclass Heteroscleromorpha, originally described as the suborder Spongillina. Members of this order are exclusively freshwater animals, and all freshwater sponges are currently considered part of this order, though the monophyly of this group has not yet been confirmed; it is currently unknown whether all freshwater sponges belong within a single natural group.

The main method of identifying and classifying sponges rely on morphology and genetics; in freshwater sponges, morphological methods analyze skeletal architecture, forms of the spicules, and traits of the gemmules. Some species, especially those endemic to ancient lakes (such as rift lakes) have lost the ability to create gemmules, necessitating other identification methods. Genetic analysis is often relied upon due to lack of clarity surrounding diagnostic aspects of morphology. Other than Arinosaster, all species of this order are currently placed within one of the seven families.

Freshwater sponges are more speciose than other sessile freshwater invertebrates, such as bryozoans and cnidarians, despite the likely presence of undescribed taxa in some areas. They are found in all continents excluding Antarctica. Some families are thought to be endemic to certain hydrographic basins, such as Lubomirskiidae to Lake Baikal, and Metschnikowiidae to the Caspian Sea. Metaniidae is thought to have a Gondwanan origin, though it is also present in Southeast Asia.

Most species, apart from those inhabiting ancient lake basins, are annual and can survive through adverse conditions using their gemmules. The gemmules are hardy enough to allow freshwater sponges to survive through icing or arid conditions, depending on species; some freshwater sponges have been found to persist in the Sahara and Kalahari-Namib deserts, with those in the Algerian Sahara surviving through less than 100 mm of rain per year and temperatures of over 40 °C (104 °F) for nearly four months. In the Amazon rainforest, sponges which grow on submerged trees during high-water periods may remain as dried remnants near the canopy during low-water periods; this could actually be advantageous as their gemmules may be spread by wind or birds.

Other than the ecosystem service of providing water filtration, freshwater sponges have been used by humans throughout history: people native to the Amazon cultivated these sponges using their gemmules, and utilized them as an ingredient to strengthen pottery. In 19th century Russia, sponges were used cosmetically as a blush and as a homeopathic remedy. Currently, freshwater sponges are being investigated for novel biomedical compounds, with some studies showing their microbiomes may be potential reservoirs for such compounds. Spicule fossils may also be useful as paleolimnological records. Conversely, an abundance of freshwater sponges could be detrimental to humans; abundant sponge biomass can disrupt fishing and aquaculture activities, and loose spicules in the water during the rainy season can cause permanent eye injury to swimmers.
