= Eunapius (sponge) =

Scientific classification
- Kingdom: Animalia
- Phylum: Porifera
- Class: Demospongiae
- Order: Spongillida
- Family: Spongillidae
- Genus: Eunapius; Gray, 1867

Genus of sponges

Eunapius is a genus of sponges belonging to the family Spongillidae.

The genus has almost cosmopolitan distribution.

Species:

- Eunapius aetheriae (Annandale, 1913)
- Eunapius ambiguus (Annandale, 1909)
- Eunapius calcuttanus (Annandale, 1911)
- Eunapius subterraneus (Sket & Velikonja, 1984)
