= Radiospongilla sceptroides =

Scientific classification
- Domain: Eukaryota
- Kingdom: Animalia
- Phylum: Porifera
- Class: Demospongiae
- Order: Spongillida
- Family: Spongillidae
- Genus: Radiospongilla
- Species: R. sceptroides

Binomial name
- Radiospongilla sceptroides (Haswell, 1882)

Synonyms
- Spongilla rotoitiensis Schröder, 1935; Spongilla sceptroides Haswell, 1883

Species of sponge

Radiospongilla sceptroides is a species of freshwater sponge in the family Spongillidae. It was described as Spongilla sceptroides by Scottish-born Australian zoologist William A. Haswell in 1883, who discovered it growing on submerged wood in a pond in the vicinity of Brisbane. He described it as "Sponge green, encrusting, smooth, moderately elastic, not crumbling." He noted the spicules were fusiform and pointed. It was found growing next to a yellowish freshwater sponge that he described as Spongilla botryoides. A 1968 review of freshwater sponges failed to locate Haswell's original type specimen, so a new one was selected from the Merrika River near Womboyn in New South Wales.

Material from New Zealand was described as Spongilla rotoitiensis, but later regarded as R. sceptroides. Yet more material originally classified as this species has been shown to be a different species, R. philippinensis.

A bright emerald green in colour and firm and rubbery in consistency, the sponge can spread laterally to some size, the new type specimen measured 46 cm × 20 cm (18 in × 8 in), growing on a flat rock.

Radiospongilla sceptroides is widely distributed (although fragmented) along Australia's eastern coastline, from central Queensland through New South Wales and into Victoria, as well as New Zealand and New Caledonia. It has never been recorded west of the Great Dividing Range. Fossil material has also been recorded from Victoria. The population of Thirlmere Lakes National Park is highly unusual in that the sponges there do not produce gemmules, which suggests that the environment in the lakes is very stable. This has not been recorded elsewhere in Australia.
