= Ephydatia muelleri =

Conservation status
- Vulnerable (NatureServe)

Scientific classification
- Kingdom: Animalia
- Phylum: Porifera
- Class: Demospongiae
- Order: Spongillida
- Family: Spongillidae
- Genus: Ephydatia
- Species: E. muelleri

Binomial name
- Ephydatia muelleri (Lieberkühn, 1856)

Species of sponge

Ephydatia muelleri is a species of Ephydatia.

This species is native to Europe and Northern America.

Synonym (basionym): Spongilla muelleri Lieberkühn, 1856.

Its genome has been sequenced.
