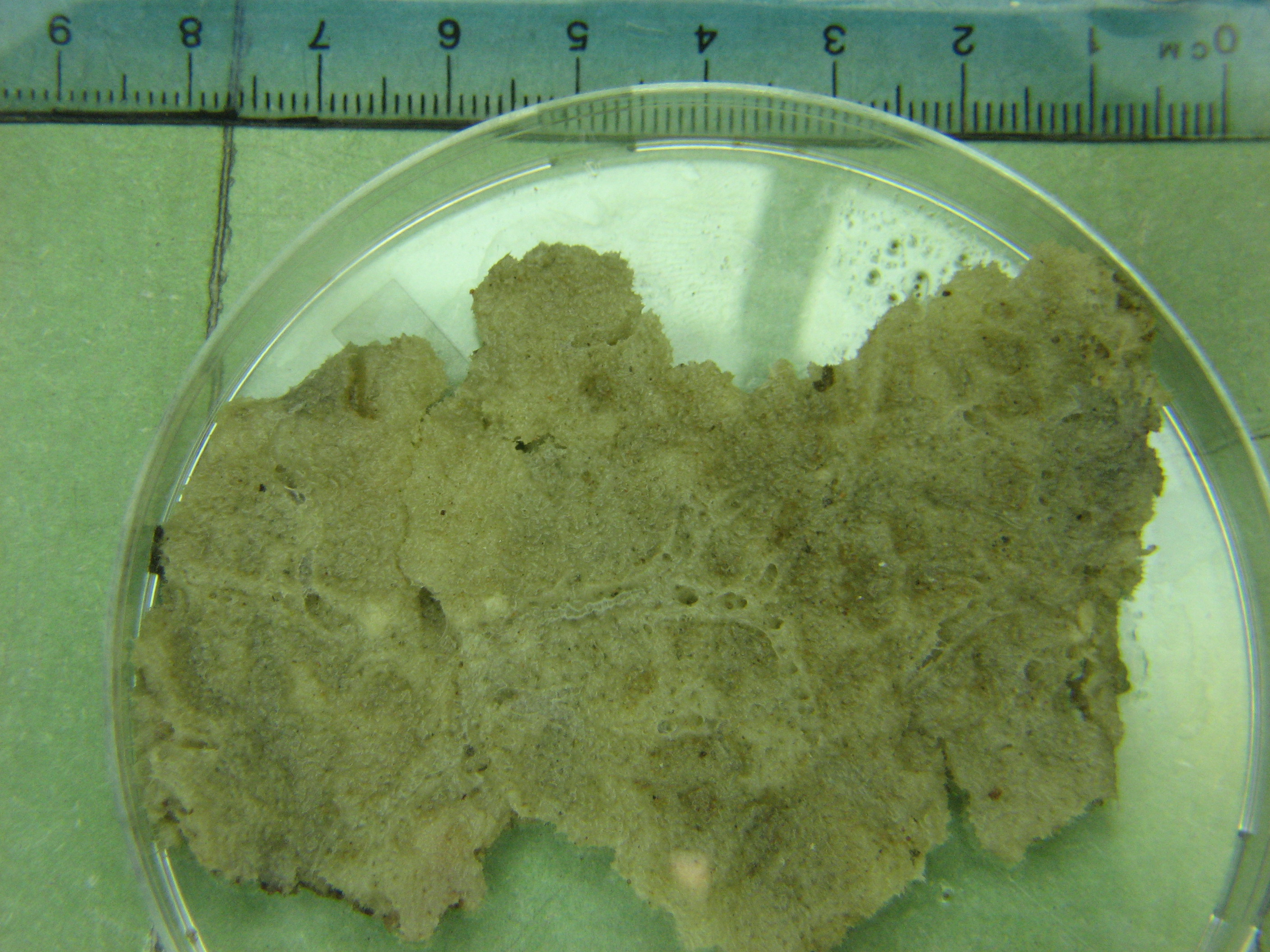

Scientific classification
- Kingdom: Animalia
- Phylum: Porifera
- Class: Demospongiae
- Order: Spongillida
- Family: Spongillidae
- Genus: Ephydatia
- Species: E. fluviatilis

Binomial name
- Ephydatia fluviatilis (Linnaeus, 1759)

= Ephydatia fluviatilis =

Species of sponge

Ephydatia fluviatilis is a species of Ephydatia.

This species is spread globally, however it is most common in the freshwater bodies of the northern hemisphere.

One study elucidated this species's habitat preference in a freshwater lake in Utah.

It has been studied that E. fluviatilis exhibits a symbiotic relationship with different phylums of bacteria in freshwater habitats such as Proteobacteria and Actinobacteria.

Also, E. fluviatilis has the ability to express different sexual phenotypes depending on the reproductive season.

Synonym (basionym): Spongia fluviatilis Linnaeus, 1759.
