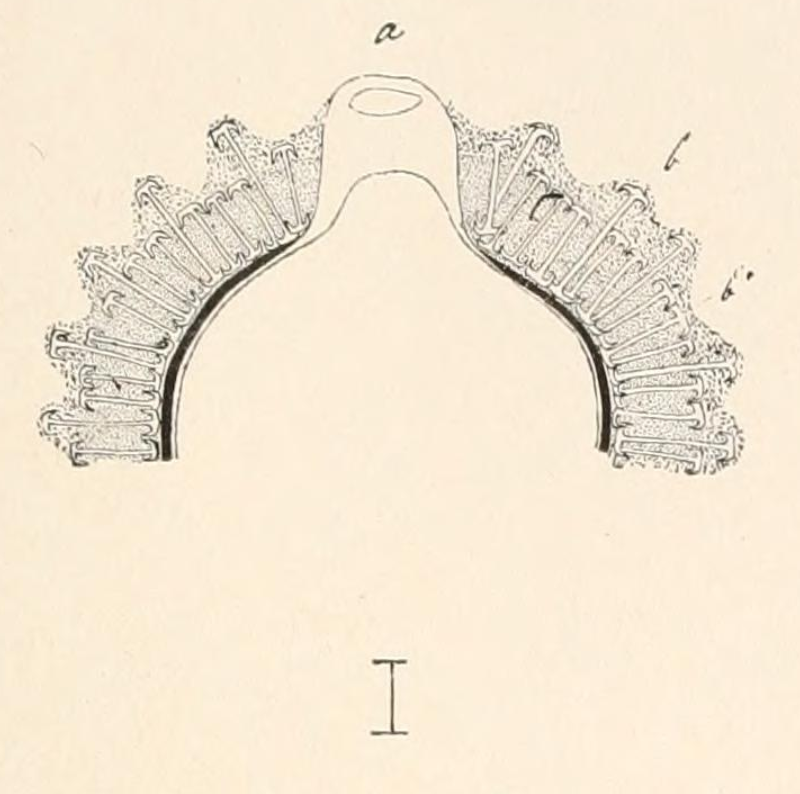
- A. argyrosperma gemmule cross section
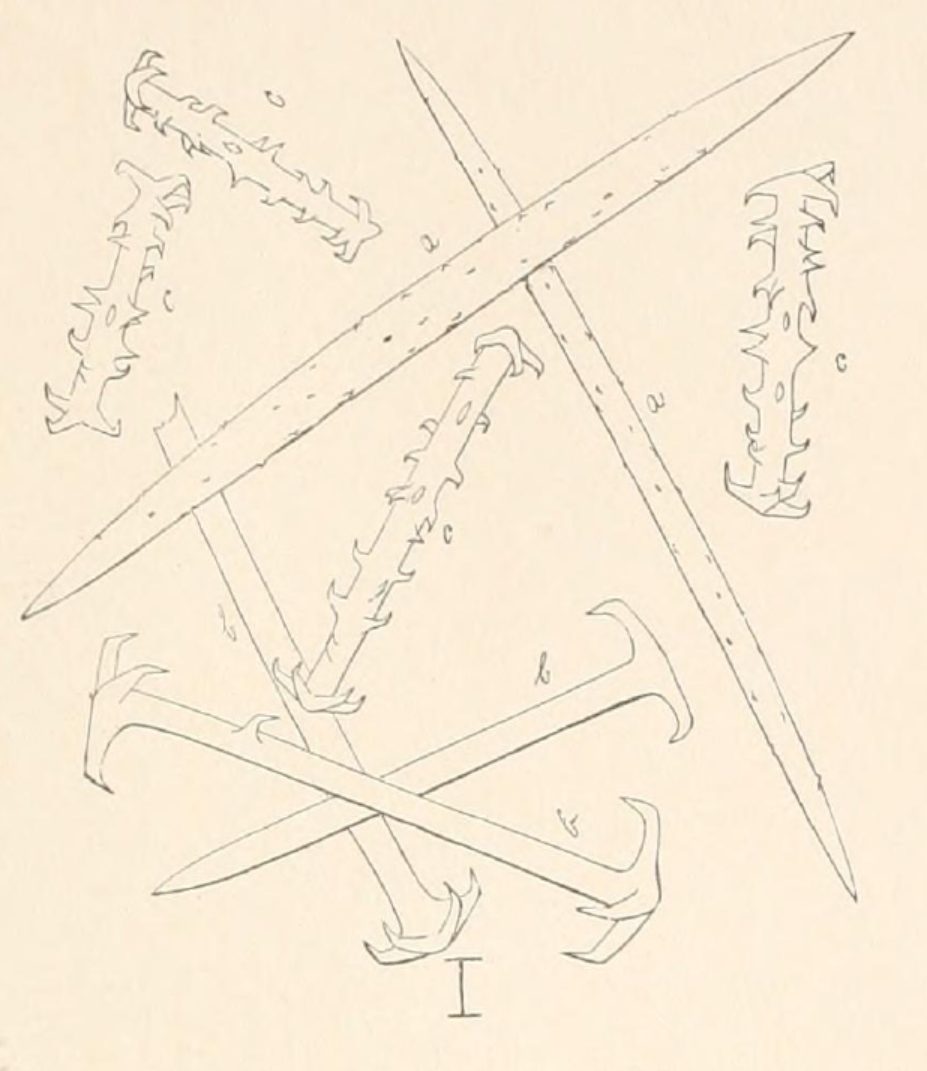
- A. argyrosperma spicules

Scientific classification
- Kingdom: Animalia
- Phylum: Porifera
- Class: Demospongiae
- Order: Spongillida
- Family: Spongillidae
- Genus: Anheteromeyenia; Schröder, 1927

Type species
- Spongilla argyrosperma Potts, 1880

Synonyms
- Heteromeyenia (Anheteromeyenia) Schröder, 1927

= Anheteromeyenia =

Genus of sponges

Anheteromeyenia is a genus of freshwater sponge. It has been recorded in the Nearctic, the Neotropics. This taxon was initially a subgenus of Heteromeyenia when K. Schöder circumscribed it in 1927, but W. M. de Laubenfels made it a genus in its own right in 1936.

As of 2018, WoRMS recognizes the following species:

- Anheteromeyenia argyrosperma (Potts, 1880)
- Anheteromeyenia cheguevarai Manconi & Pronzato, 2005
- Anheteromeyenia diamantina Calheira & Pinheiro, 2018
- Anheteromeyenia ornata (Bonetto & Ezcurra de Drago, 1970) Volkmer-Ribeiro, 1996
- Anheteromeyenia vitrea Buso & Volkmer-Ribeiro, 2012
