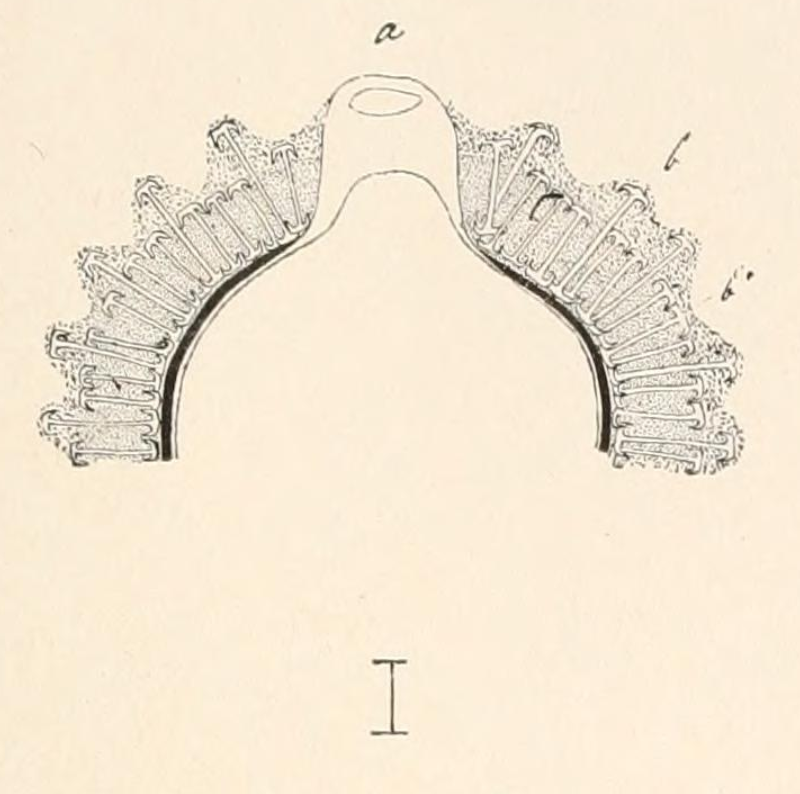
- Gemmule cross section
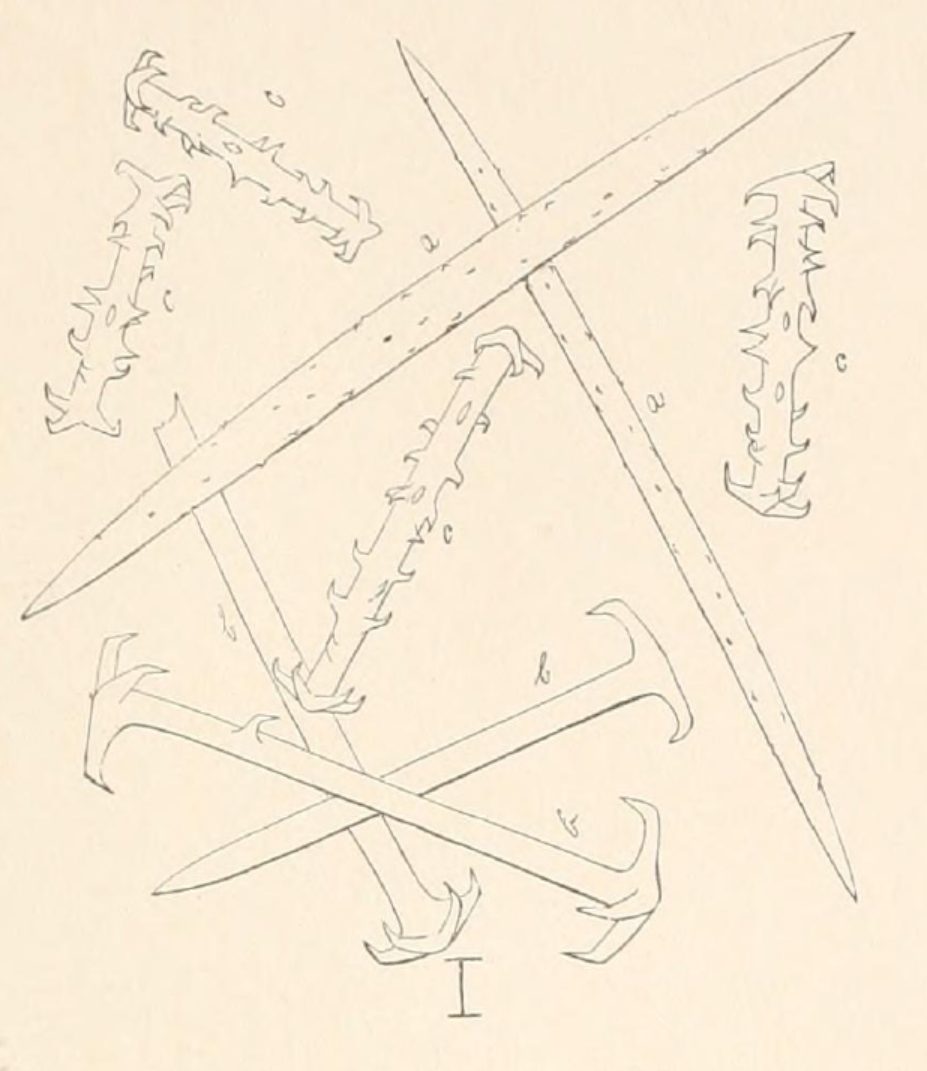
- Spicules

Scientific classification
- Kingdom: Animalia
- Phylum: Porifera
- Class: Demospongiae
- Order: Spongillida
- Family: Spongillidae
- Genus: Anheteromeyenia
- Species: A. argyrosperma

Binomial name
- Anheteromeyenia argyrosperma (Potts, 1880)

Synonyms
- Heteromeyenia (Anheteromeyenia) argyrosperma; Spongilla argyrosperma Potts, 1880

= Anheteromeyenia argyrosperma =

Species of sponge

Anheteromeyenia argyrosperma is a freshwater sponge found across North America.

== Geographical range ==
Nearctic region from Canada (Quebec, New Brunswick) to Florida and northern Alaska to southern California.

== Habitat ==
Anheteromeyenia argyrosperma is found in both lotic (flowing water) and lentic (still) habitats. Typically in waters of about neutral pH with low to moderate alkalinity and high conductivity; in temperatures of 9 to 23 °C. They are sessile suspension feeders that attach to submerged surfaces such as rocks and logs in most inland habitats.

== Diet ==
Sponges filter the water through them to collect numerous species of smaller organisms such as bacteria and protozoa. Anheteromeyenia argyrosperma are especially important in nutrient cycling and primary production.

== Physical characteristics (morphology) ==
Anheteromeyenia argyrosperma have a thin, encrusting form with a hispid surface due to emerging spicules. Their color is grey unless green from being in symbiosis with zoochlorellae (algae). Their bodies are permeated with pores, chambers, and canals for the flow of water through them. The smaller, more prevalent incurrent pores are the ostia and the larger excurrent pores are the oscula. Within A. argyrosperma the oscules are inconspicuous.

== Cell structure/internal characteristics ==
Sponges have no true tissues or germ layers. While the cells are loosely organized, different cells are responsible for different functions within the animal but have the ability to transform into different cell types. Anheteromeyenia are the leuconoid stage of progression which means their form is of many collected channels and chambers clustered together so water moves throughout the specimen. The tissue is called the mesohyl and the water movement occurs through flagellated cells called choanocytes. A. argyrosperma have siliceous spicules and collagen fibers to give it its form. Spicules are needle like structures which form the mineral skeleton. Megascleres are large spicules that form the main skeleton. Within A. argyrosperma the megascleres are slender, slightly curved acanthoxeas that range in length from 250- 329 μm and in width from 10-15 μm. Microscleres are absent.

== Reproduction ==
Anheteromeyenia can reproduce sexually or asexually. They can produce live larvae sexually or asexually they may bud or if a section breaks off the cells can reaggregate and grow into new specimens. In times of environmental stress, which is much more often in freshwater sponges, they can reduce their bodies or produce gemmules or "cysts" which form a hard, protective coating over the asexual larvae so they can be moved about and grow when the conditions permit or are more favorable. In A. argyrosperma the gemmules are yellow and spherical with a diameter ranging from 400-700 μm. The gemmuloscleres have birotulates of two notably different lengths. These details of long recurved rays with shaft spines and the shorter more abundant variation along with the length range of gemmuloscleres are some of the most reliable details to observe in identification.

== Misidentification ==
May be mistaken for common algae growth on rocks in habitat because of similar green color and flat in morphological types within a given species.

== Additional importance ==
Anheteromeyenia argyrosperma live very much within a symbiosis state with many forms of algae (what gives it a green color, see above). This zoochlorellae may augment or supplement their sponge host's nutrition. Also, because of being a susceptible and responsive freshwater animal, Anheteromeyenia species are potentially very valuable indicators of water quality.
