= Ephydatia =

- E. gutenbergiana from the Messel Formation

Scientific classification
- Kingdom: Animalia
- Phylum: Porifera
- Class: Demospongiae
- Order: Spongillida
- Family: Spongillidae
- Genus: Ephydatia; Lamouroux, 1816

Species
- See text

Synonyms
- Clypeatula Peterson & Addis, 2000; Ephidatia Lecoq, 1862; Meyenia Carter, 1881; Pleiomeyenia Mills, 1884; Trachispongilla Rousseau, 1906; Trachyspongilla Dybovsky, 1878

Genus of sponges

Ephydatia is a genus of sponges belonging to the family Spongillidae.

The genus was first described by Jean Lamouroux in 1816.

The genus has cosmopolitan distribution.

Species:

- Ephydatia caatingae Nicacio & Pinheiro, 2015
- Ephydatia chileana Pisera & Sáez, 2003
- Ephydatia facunda Weltner, 1895
- Ephydatia fluviatilis (Linnaeus, 1759)
- Ephydatia fortis Weltner, 1895
- Ephydatia gibbsii Gray, 1821
- Ephydatia gutenbergiana (Müller, Zahn & Maidhoff, 1982)
- Ephydatia japonica (Hilgendorf, 1882)
- Ephydatia kaiseri Rauff, 1926
- Ephydatia meyeni (Carter, 1849)
- Ephydatia millsii (Potts, 1888)
- Ephydatia muelleri (Lieberkühn, 1856)
- Ephydatia mülleri (Lieberkühn, 1855)
- Ephydatia ramsayi (Haswell, 1883)
- Ephydatia robusta (Potts, 1888)
- Ephydatia subtilis Weltner, 1895
- Ephydatia syriaca Topsent, 1910
