= John Hogg (biologist) =

British biologist

John Hogg (1800–1869) was a British naturalist who wrote about amphibians, birds, plants, reptiles, and protists. In 1839, he became a member of the Royal Society.

John Hogg is credited with the creation of a fourth kingdom, accompanying Carl Linnaeus's Lapides, Plantae and Animalia, to classify Life, namely Protoctista.

== Background ==
In 1735, the Swedish botanist Carl Linnaeus formalized living things into two supergroups, in his monumental Systema Naturae. All organisms were placed into the Kingdoms Plantae and Animalia. Linnaeus added a third kingdom of the natural world in 1766; Lapides (rocks). These were deemed to be similar to plants in that they were, neither living nor sentient, i.e. not having senses. They were further characterised as solid bodied.

== Fourth kingdom ==
In 1860, Hogg created a fourth kingdom, the Regnum Primigenum or Protoctista. His rationale was simply that a kingdom of 'first beings' was necessary, as these entities were believed to have existed prior to plants and animals.

Hogg attempted to justify his arguments for a fourth kingdom with Spongilla, a freshwater green sponge, that was an animal known to exude oxygen in the light. However, the photosynthesis was later shown to be a result of symbiotic 'algae'.

Such an attempt to apply non-reductionist thought to classification systems during a period of biological debate made Hogg a protagonist within the field of nineteenth century biology along with Ernst Haeckel and Charles Darwin.
