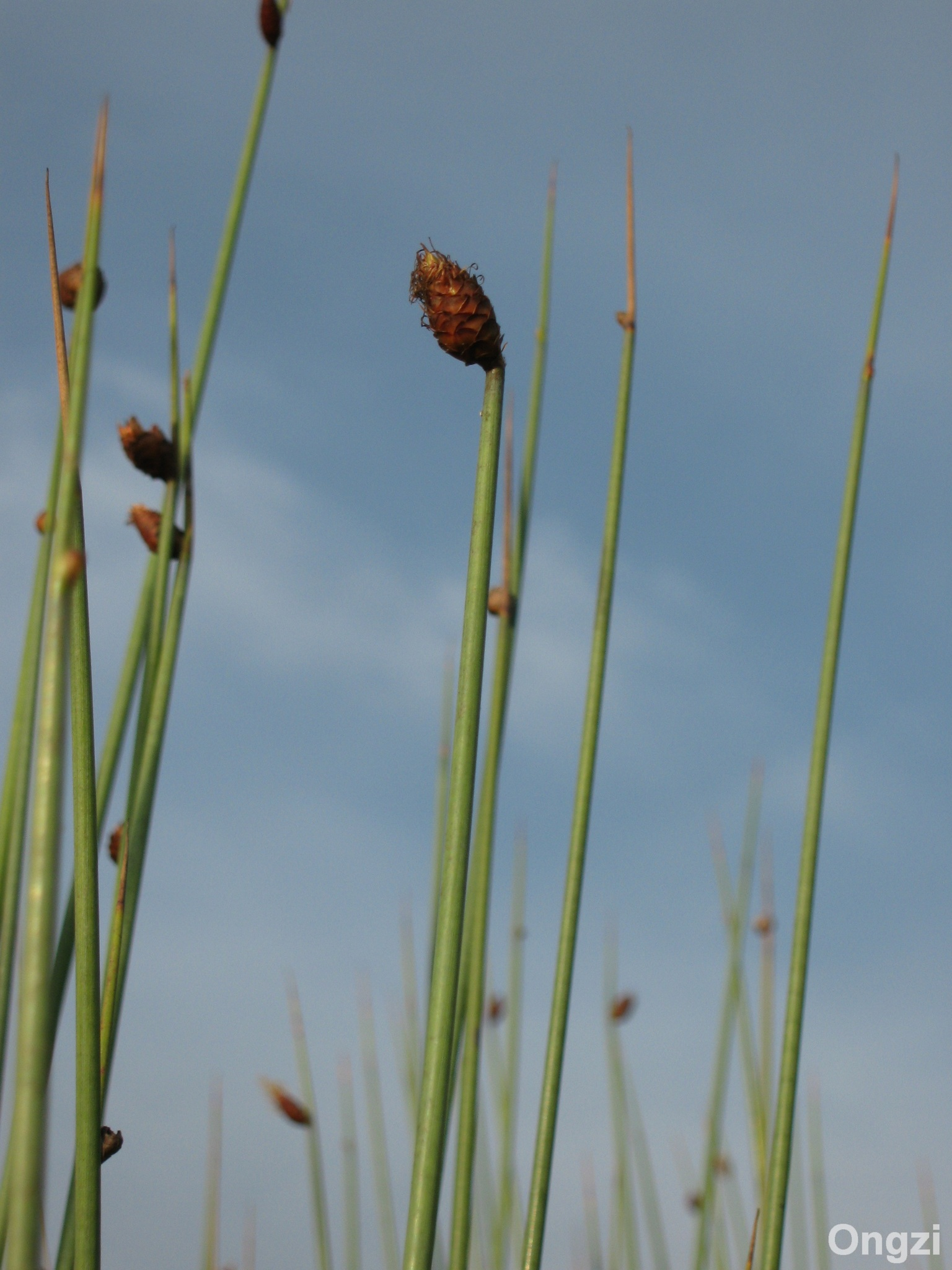

Scientific classification
- Kingdom: Plantae
- Clade: Tracheophytes
- Clade: Angiosperms
- Clade: Monocots
- Clade: Commelinids
- Order: Poales
- Family: Cyperaceae
- Genus: Lepironia; Rich.
- Species: L. articulata

Binomial name
- Lepironia articulata (Retz.) Domin

Synonyms
- Chondrachne R.Br; Lepyronia T.Lestib.; Choricarpha Boeckeler; Restio articulatus Retz; Chondrachne articulata (Retz.) R.Br.; Lepironia mucronata Rich. in C.H.Persoon; Scirpus coniferus Poir. in J.B.A.M.de Lamarck; Choricarpha aphylla Boeckeler; Lepironia mucronata var. capitata F.Muell.; Lepironia compressa Boeckeler; Lepironia mucronata var. compressa (Boeckeler) E.G.Camus in H.Lecomte; Lepironia articulata var. capitata (F.Muell.) Domin; Lepironia conifera (Poir.) Druce

= Lepironia =

Genus of grass-like plants

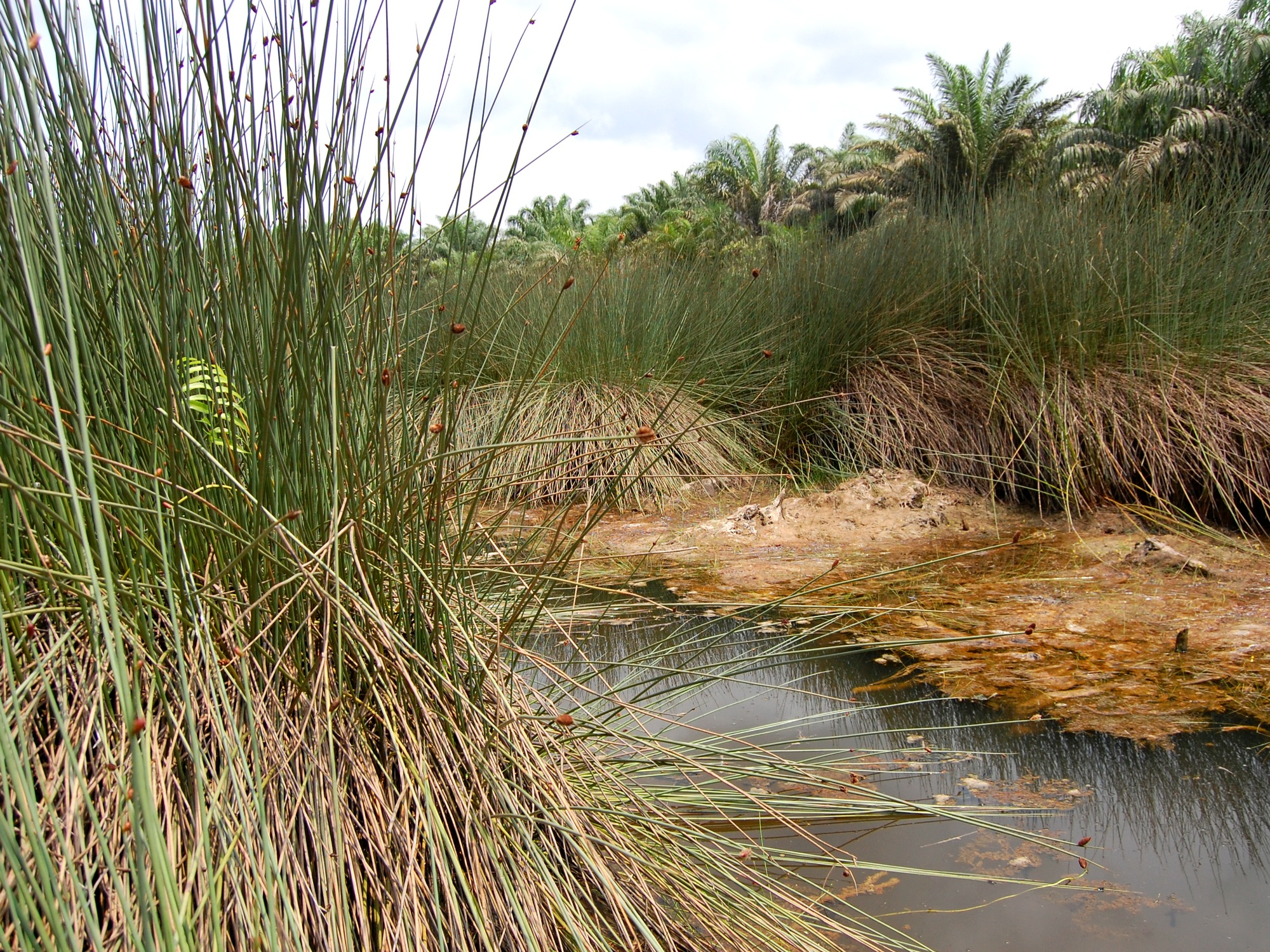
Lepironia articulata

Lepironia is a genus of the sedge family, comprising only one species, Lepironia articulata, known as the grey sedge. It is found in Madagascar, India, Sri Lanka, southern China, Southeast Asia (Malaysia, Indochina, Indonesia), New Guinea, and various islands of the western Pacific (Ryukyu Islands, Caroline Islands, Fiji, Tonga, New Caledonia). It also occurs in northern and eastern Australia, as far south as Thirlmere Lakes National Park in New South Wales.

== Green Straw ==
Lepironia has the potential to be a green straw or zero waste drinking straw: in Vietnam and Indonesia, the process of producing straws is not difficult, merely cleaning the stems of plants and allowing them to dry in the sun. Lepironia straws offer a solution for the dilemma of using plastic straws.
