= Thirlmere Lakes National Park =

National park in Australia

- IUCN category II (national park)
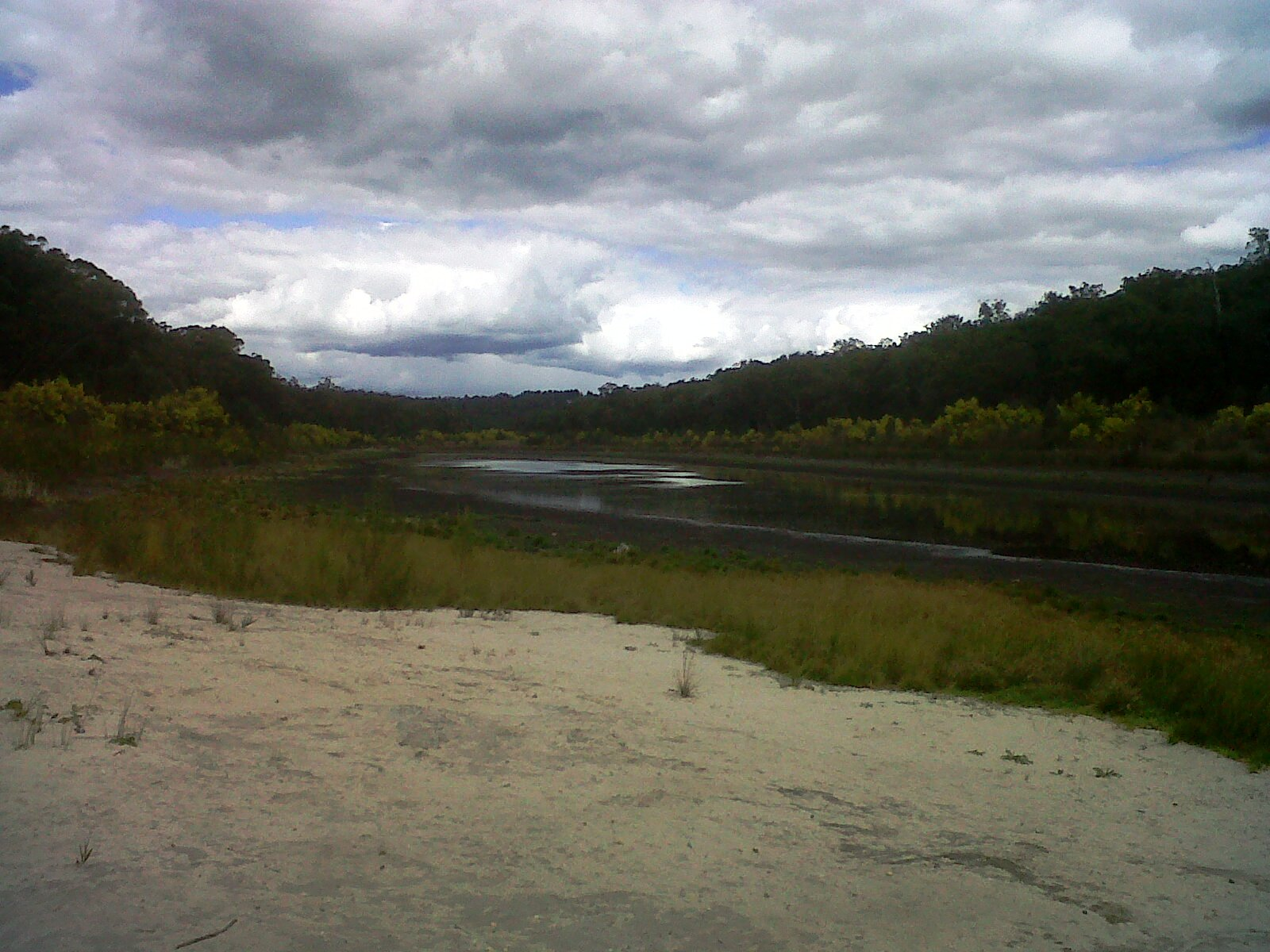
- Thirlmere Lakes

- Location within New South Wales
- Location: New South Wales
- Nearest city: Couridjah
- Coordinates: 34°13′32″S 150°32′19″E
- Area: 6.29 km^{2} (2.43 sq mi)
- Established: 7 April 1972
- Governing body: NSW National Parks and Wildlife Service
- Website: Official website

The Thirlmere Lakes National Park is a protected national park in the Macarthur region of New South Wales, in eastern Australia. The 629-hectare (1,550-acre) national park is situated approximately 95 kilometres (59 mi) southwest of the Sydney central business district, and just to the west of Thirlmere. It was gazetted in 1972 as Thirlmere Lakes State Park, before being subsequently reclassified as a national park.

== History ==
The national park is one of the eight protected areas that, in 2000, was inscribed to form part of the UNESCO World Heritage–listed Greater Blue Mountains Area. The Thirlmere Lakes National Park is the most south–easterly and the smallest of the eight protected areas within the World Heritage Site.

=== Crisis ===
Two of the lakes have dried out since the mid 1980s due to removal of groundwater in the region secondary to coal mining at the Tahmoor Colliery. The local community is investigating plans to revive the lakes, which might take decades otherwise.

== Features ==
The main feature of the park are the lakes, thought to have formed around 15 million years ago by geological activity, the land lifting and largely cutting them off from the local river system. Their outflow is reduced to the small Blue Gum Creek, which flows west into the Little River in the adjacent Nattai National Park to the west.

The lakes and their environs contain an unusual and diverse array of flora and fauna. It contains the rare freshwater sponge Radiospongilla sceptroides, and is notable for an absence of freshwater snails. The lakes contain the rare watershield (Brasenia schreberi) and are lined with rare species such as the grey sedge (Lepironia articulata) and the wooly frogsmouth lily (Philydrum lanuginosum). The habitat provides a home for the otherwise scarce Australasian bittern (Botaurus poiciloptilus), and migratory Latham's snipe Gallinago hardwickii.

The habitat around the lakes is open sclerophyll forest, the dominant trees being rough-barked apple (Angophora floribunda) nearby and Sydney peppermint (Eucalyptus piperita) and red bloodwood (Corymbia gummifera) on elevated areas. The understory species include many familiar sydney sandstone flora such as members of the genera Banksia, Acacia, pea flowers, and the New South Wales waratah (Telopea speciosissima)

== Climate ==
Thirlmere Lakes National Park

Climate chart (precipitation, max. and min. temperature)
J	F	M	A	M	J	J	A	S	O	N	D
123 31 13	215 24 15	164 23 12	119 20 10	54 17 7	177 12 5	34 13 4	97 14 7	53 20 8	53 26 10	87 28 11	112 28 14
- █ Average max. and min. temperatures in °C
- █ Precipitation totals in mm
Imperial conversion
J	F	M	A	M	J	J	A	S	O	N	D
4.8 88 55	8.5 75 59	6.5 73 54	4.7 68 50	2.1 63 45	7 54 41	1.3 55 39	3.8 57 45	2.1 68 46	2.1 79 50	3.4 82 52	4.4 82 57
- █ Average max. and min. temperatures in °F
- █ Precipitation totals in inches

== Gallery ==
Photos of Thirlmere Lakes National Park
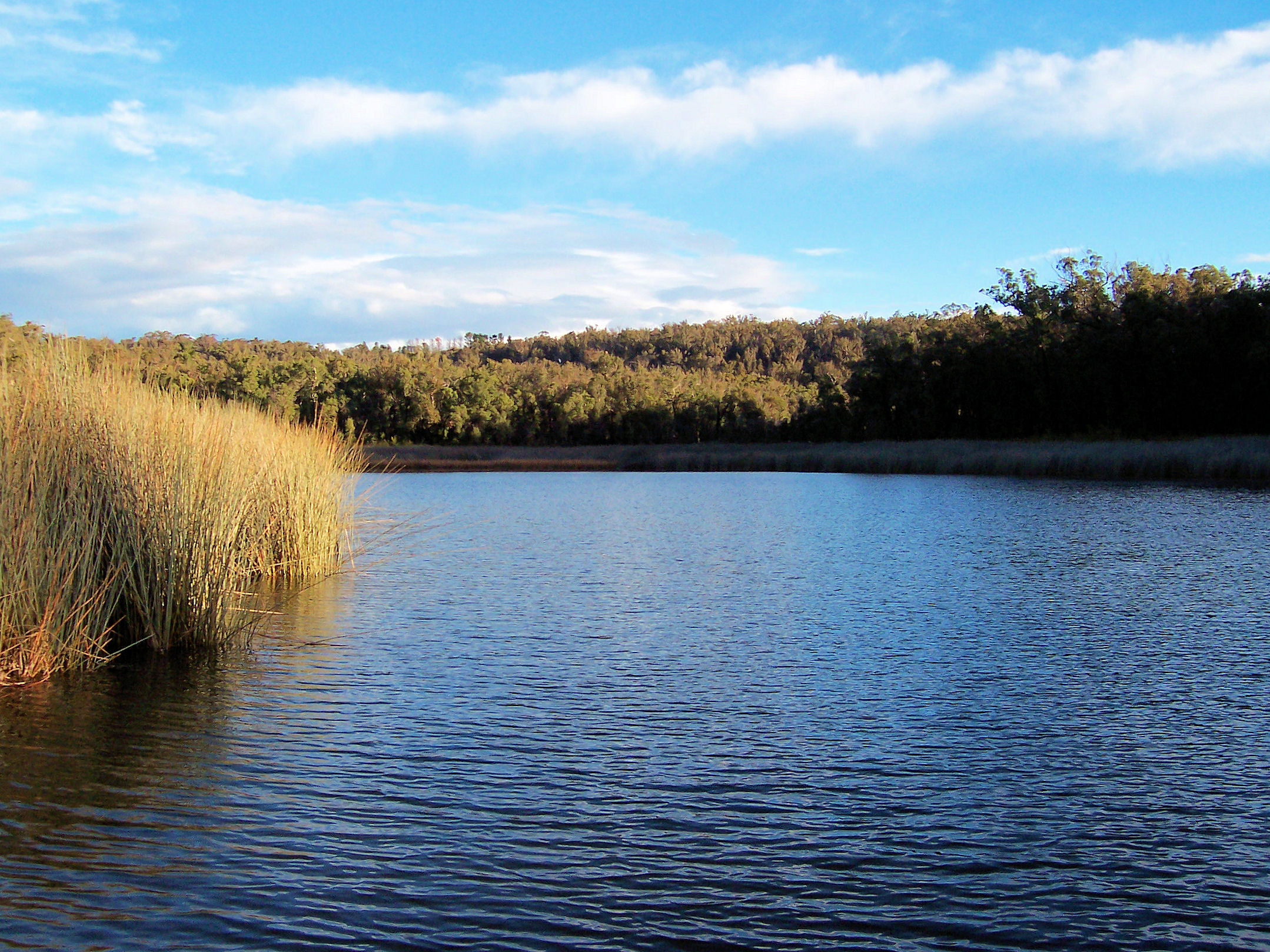
Thirlmere Lake in Thirlmere Lakes National Park

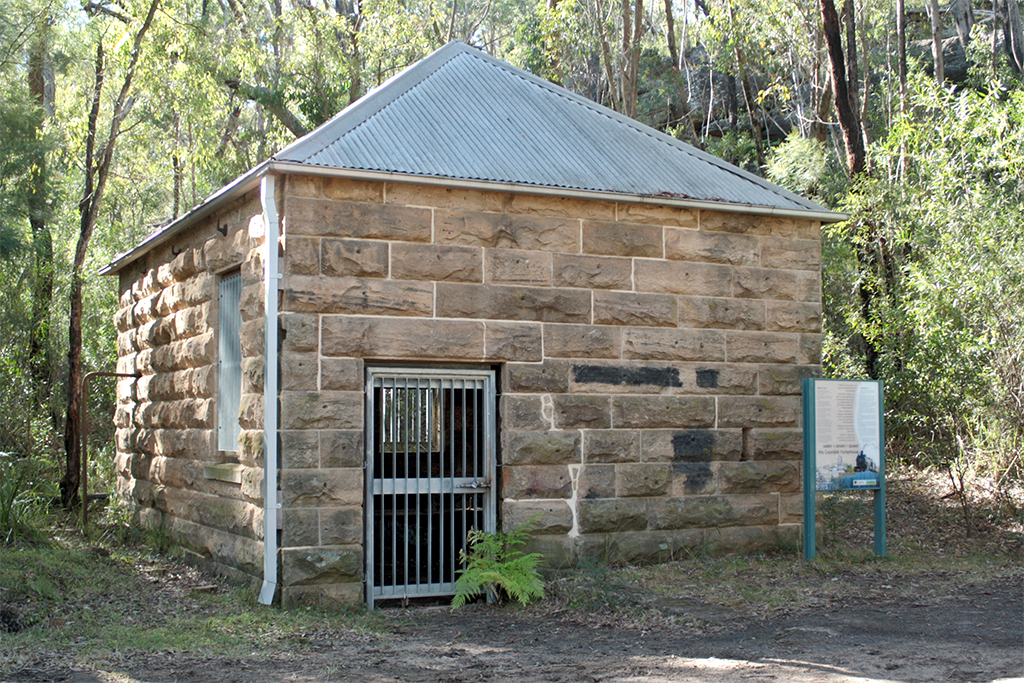
Pumphouse supplying water for steam trains at Couridjah Station

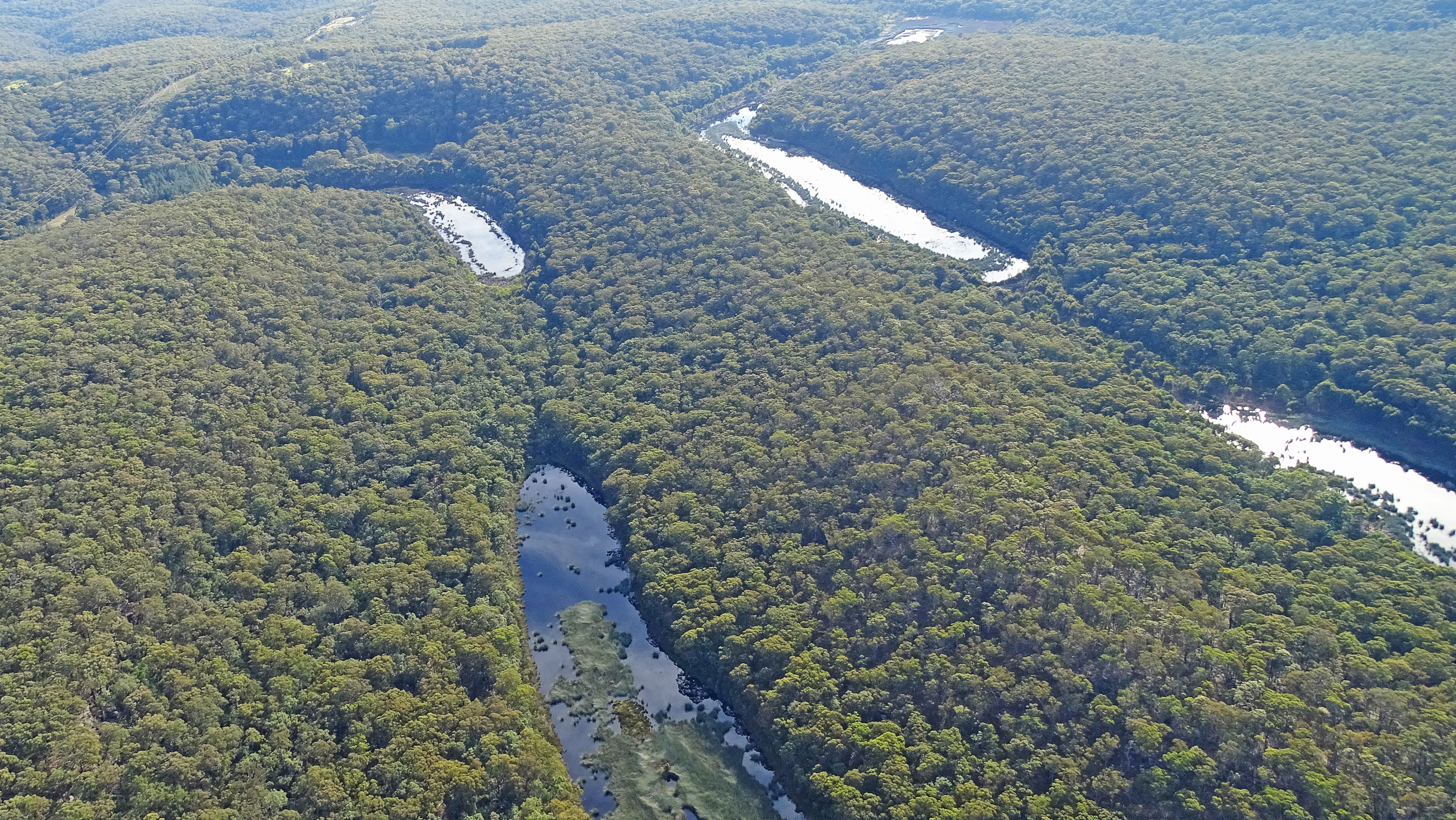
The five lakes in Thirlmere Lakes National Park

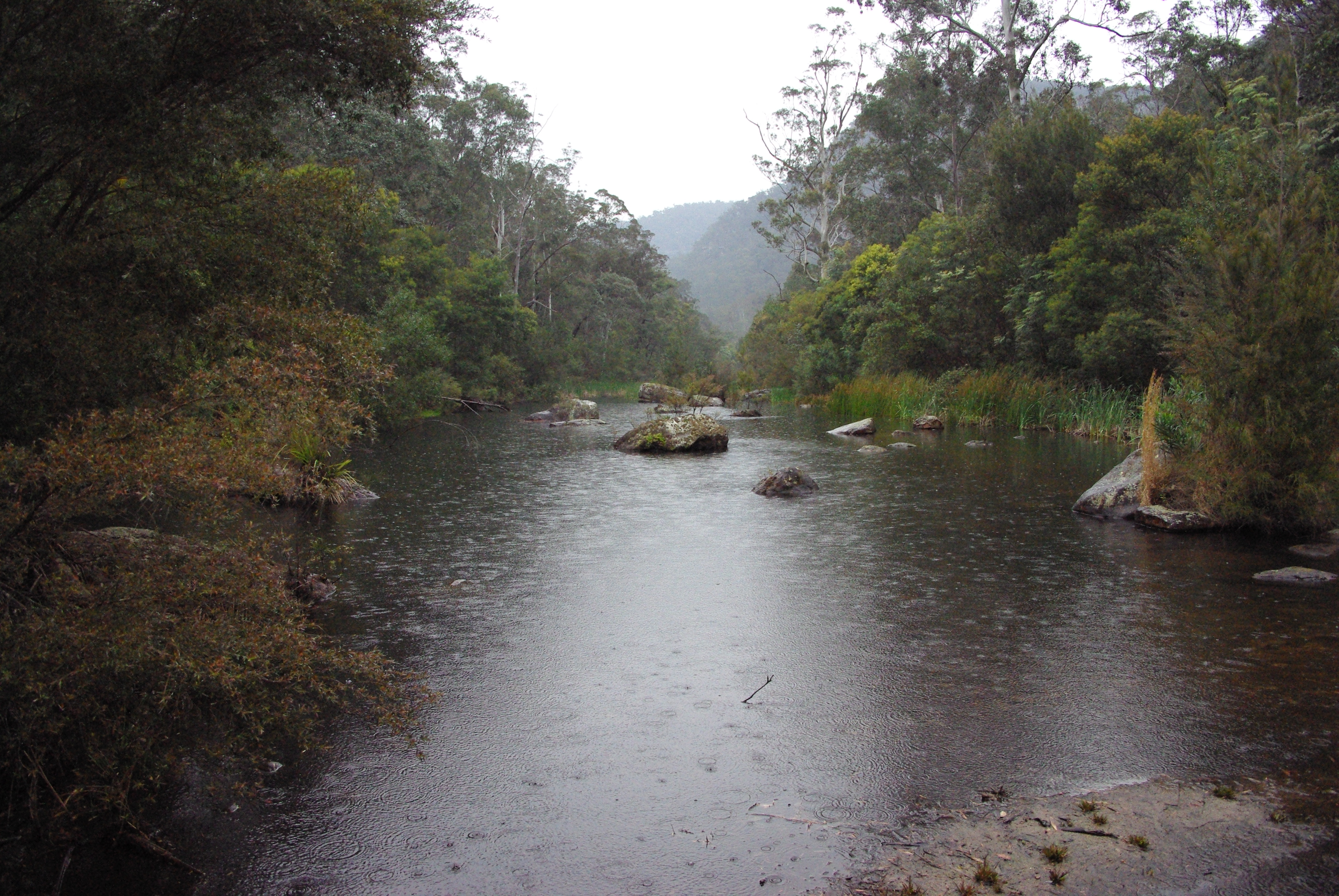
Ford in Thirlmere Lakes National Park

== See also ==
- Protected areas of New South Wales
