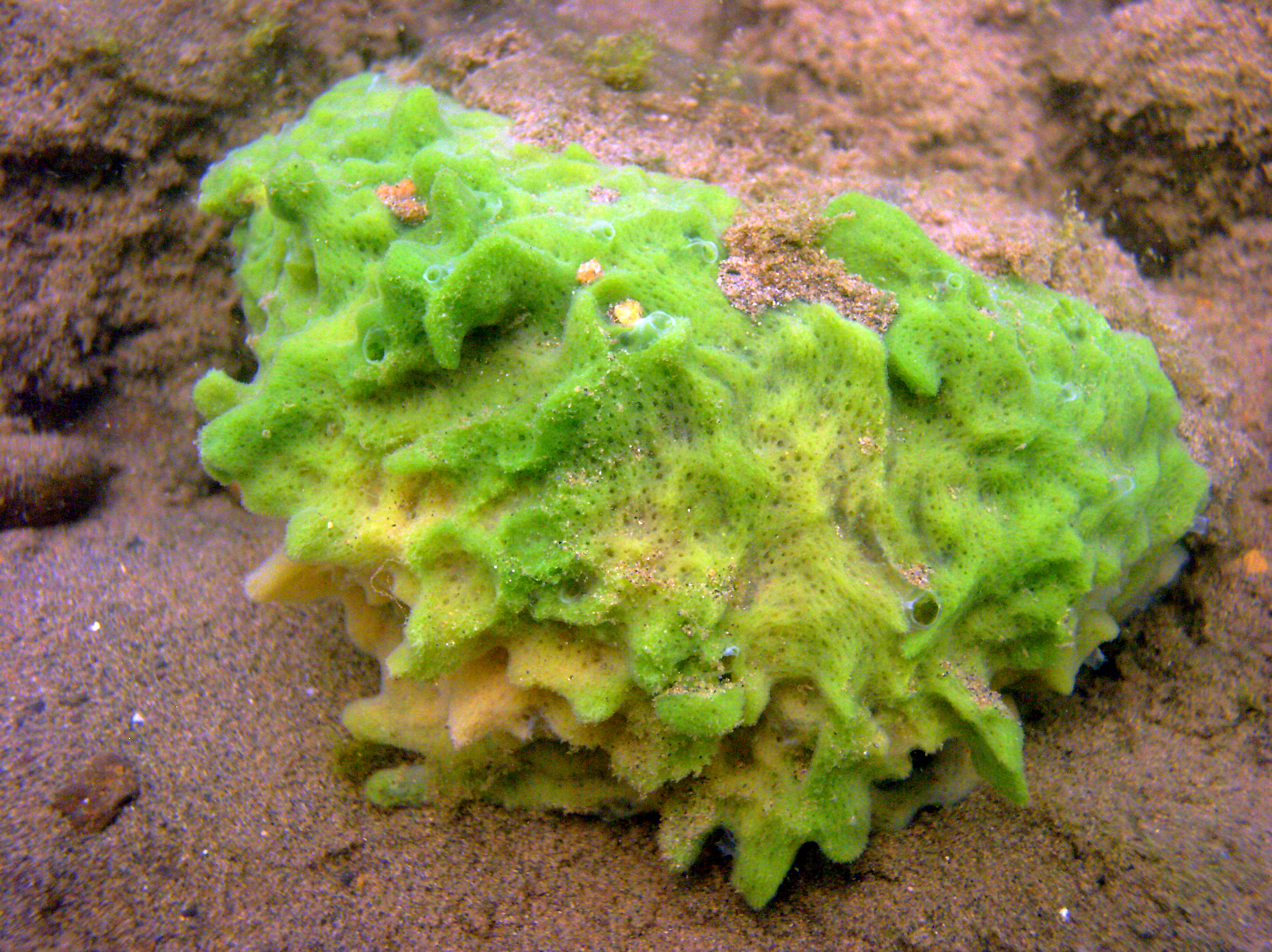

Conservation status
- Secure (NatureServe)

Scientific classification
- Kingdom: Animalia
- Phylum: Porifera
- Class: Demospongiae
- Order: Spongillida
- Family: Spongillidae
- Genus: Spongilla
- Species: S. lacustris

Binomial name
- Spongilla lacustris Linnaeus, 1758

Synonyms
- List: Euspongilla lacustris (Linnaeus, 1759); Spongia lacustris Linnaeus, 1759; Spongilla abortiva Potts, 1880; Spongilla crustacea Kozhoff, 1925; Spongilla dawsoni Bowerbank, 1864; Spongilla erinaceus Ehrenberg, 1841; Spongilla fenestrata Kozhoff, 1925; Spongilla flexispina Dawson, 1878; Spongilla jordanensis Vejdovsky, 1877; Spongilla lacustrioides MacKay, 1885; Spongilla lacustroides Kozhoff, 1925; Spongilla lieberkuehni Noll, 1870; Spongilla microgemmata Swartschewsky, 1901; Spongilla mirabilis Retzer, 1883; Spongilla montana Potts, 1880; Spongilla multiformis Carter, 1881; Spongilla paupercula Bowerbank, 1863; Spongilla ramosa Lamarck, 1816; Spongilla rhenana Retzer, 1883

= Spongilla lacustris =

Species of sponge

Spongilla lacustris is a species of freshwater sponge from the family Spongillidae that inhabits rivers and lakes, often growing on logs or rocks. Lacustris is a Latin word meaning "related to or associated with lakes".

Spongilla lacustris is a demosponge with a broad distribution ranging from North America to Eurasia. It is the most common freshwater sponge in Central Europe, is the most widespread sponge in Northern Britain, and is one of the most common species of sponges in lakes and canals. It has the ability to reproduce both sexually and asexually. They become dormant during winter. The growth form ranges from encrusting, to digitate, to branched, depending upon the quality of the habitat.

== Classification ==
Spongilla lacustris is part of the class demosponges of the phylum Porifera. The Porifera phylum contains all sponges which are characterized by the small pores on the outer layer, which take in water. The cells in the sponge walls filter food from the water. Whatever is not uptaken by the sponge is pumped through the body out of a large opening. The class demosponges are the most abundant and diverse of the sponge classes. Some of the sponges in this class have skeletons made from silicon-containing spicules, spongin fibers, or both. Demosponges include both marine and freshwater sponges.

== Reproduction ==
Freshwater sponges reproduce both sexually and asexually, exhibiting two methods of asexual reproduction: by gemmules and by budding.

Gemmules: Gemmules are elaborate, highly-resistant resting stages formed by freshwater sponges. Gemmules can be produced at any time during the growing season, but most production occurs in the autumn, triggered by seasonal changes in light and temperature. They form by migration of food-filled archaeocytes, also called amoebocytes, into discrete masses. This archaeocyte core becomes enveloped in several different hardened membrane layers, forming a shell. Gemmules are able to withstand repeated freezing and thawing, desiccation and prolonged darkness. When environmental conditions improve and water temperature exceeds 13 to 23 °C, germination occurs and the young sponge leaves its shell and starts a new animal.

Budding: The second asexual method is budding. This occurs in springtime when the sponge forms buds in its outer layer. These will eventually drift away from the original structure to form a new colony.

Sexual: The summer is when sexual reproduction occurs. These freshwater sponges are hermaphroditic, meaning that each sponge produces both sperm and egg. The sperm are released into the water where they will travel into another sponge's ostia. The sponge subsequently gives birth to live, free-swimming larvae after developing in the sponge's inner cavity.

== Habitats ==
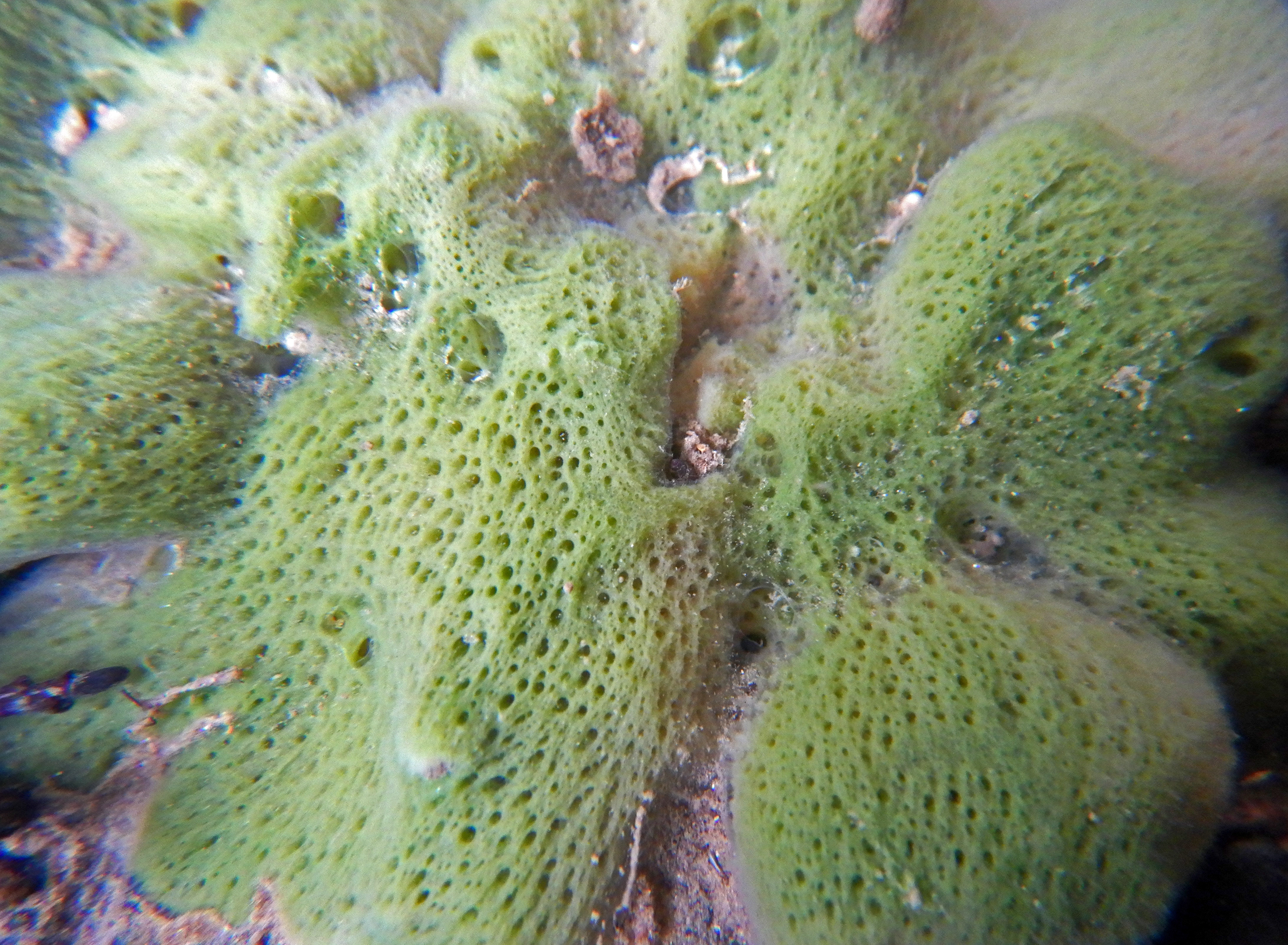
Spongilla lacustris from a river in France

Spongilla lacustris are freshwater sponges that prefer shallow, clear waters. They are commonly found in ponds, lakes, and slow-moving waters. They can be found both protected from the sun under rocks and logs, and on reeds and on rocks where there is more exposure.

== Diet and food chain ==
Spongilla lacustris are filter eaters that consume small floating organic particles. They are consumed by Sisyridae, a group of winged insects also known as sponge flies or spongillaflies. Their larvae act as parasites on the sponge and feed exclusively on it during its larval period. Ceraclea are insects that not only feed on the sponges but will use the sponges' spicules to build hard, protective cases for themselves. As the larva grows, it not only adds spicules to its casing but pieces of the sponge itself. When the ceraclea reaches adulthood and leaves the sponge, it carries and disburses fragments, thus facilitating the formation of new sponge colonies.

== Characteristics ==
Spongilla lacustris can appear in several forms, including branching, clump-like, or crust. On average, the sponge grows to be a few inches in length. The color ranges from white to green, depending on the amount of zoochlorella, a green algal tissue, available. The algal tissue has a symbiotic relationship with the freshwater sponge. The algae help facilitate oxygen and food uptake for the sponge, while the sponge provides the algae a surface to live on.

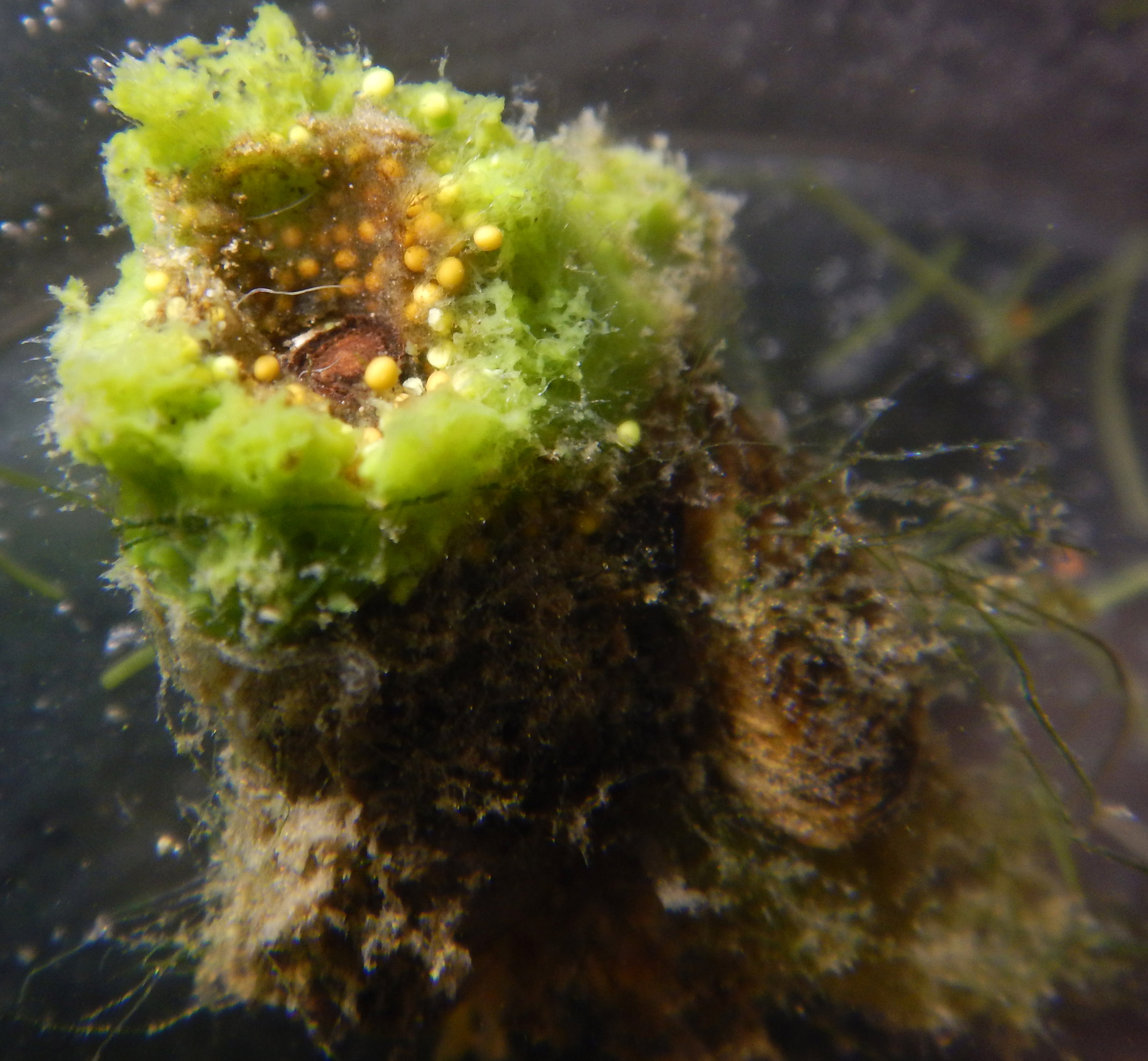
The gemmules of Spongilla lacustris inside the original parent sponge

The texture of the sponge itself is soft. The ostia (dermal pores) let water into the sponge to be filtered. The oscula is the hole from which water exits. Although the oscula is bigger than the ostia, both are extremely small and difficult to see. Spicules cover the thin dermal membrane, although the texture of the sponge itself is soft. The spicules are made of silica and provide structural support as well as protection. Freshwater sponge spicules come in many sizes and forms, including microscleres, emmula microscleres, and parenchyma macroscleres.

=== Cell types ===
Neuroid cells in S. lacustris have been identified as a distinct cell type that lacks true synapses but functions in cell-to-cell communication, particularly in relation to choanocytes, the feeding cells of the sponge. These cells interact with other cell types through chemical signaling, though the exact nature of these signals remains under investigation.

S. lacustris possesses a variety of cell types, including choanocytes, pinacocytes, archaeocytes, and neuroid cells. Choanocytes are flagellated cells responsible for water movement and nutrient capture. Pinacocytes form the outer layer of the sponge, providing structural integrity. Archaeocytes serve as multipotent cells capable of differentiating into other cell types and play a role in digestion and transport of nutrients. Neuroid cells, identified near choanocyte chambers, lack synapses but have been observed interacting closely with choanocytes, suggesting a role in regulating feeding behavior.

S. lacustris contains specialized contractile structures that regulate water flow. These contractile pockets, located near the oscula and excurrent canals, are formed by aggregations of pinacocytes. These structures contract in response to external stimuli, controlling the rate of water expulsion. Contractions occur in coordination with environmental changes, such as fluctuations in water quality or the presence of particulate matter, ensuring efficient filtration and waste removal. The contraction mechanism is thought to involve cellular interactions within the mesohyl, the gelatinous matrix between sponge cell layers.

A 2019 report indicates that neuroid cells play a role in modulating these contractions, but the specific molecular mechanisms remain unknown. Unlike more complex animals, sponges lack true nervous systems, and their coordination relies on localized cellular interactions and chemical signaling. Identifying the chemical messengers involved in these processes remains an active area of research, with ongoing efforts focused on understanding the evolutionary significance of these primitive signaling pathways.
