= Sanidastra =

Scientific classification
- Domain: Eukaryota
- Kingdom: Animalia
- Phylum: Porifera
- Class: Demospongiae
- Order: Spongillida
- Family: Spongillidae
- Genus: Sanidastra; Volkmer-Ribeiro & Watanabe, 1983

Genus of sponges

Sanidastra is a genus of sponges belonging to the family Spongillidae.

== Species ==
- Sanidastra yokotonensis Volkmer & Watanabe, 1983
