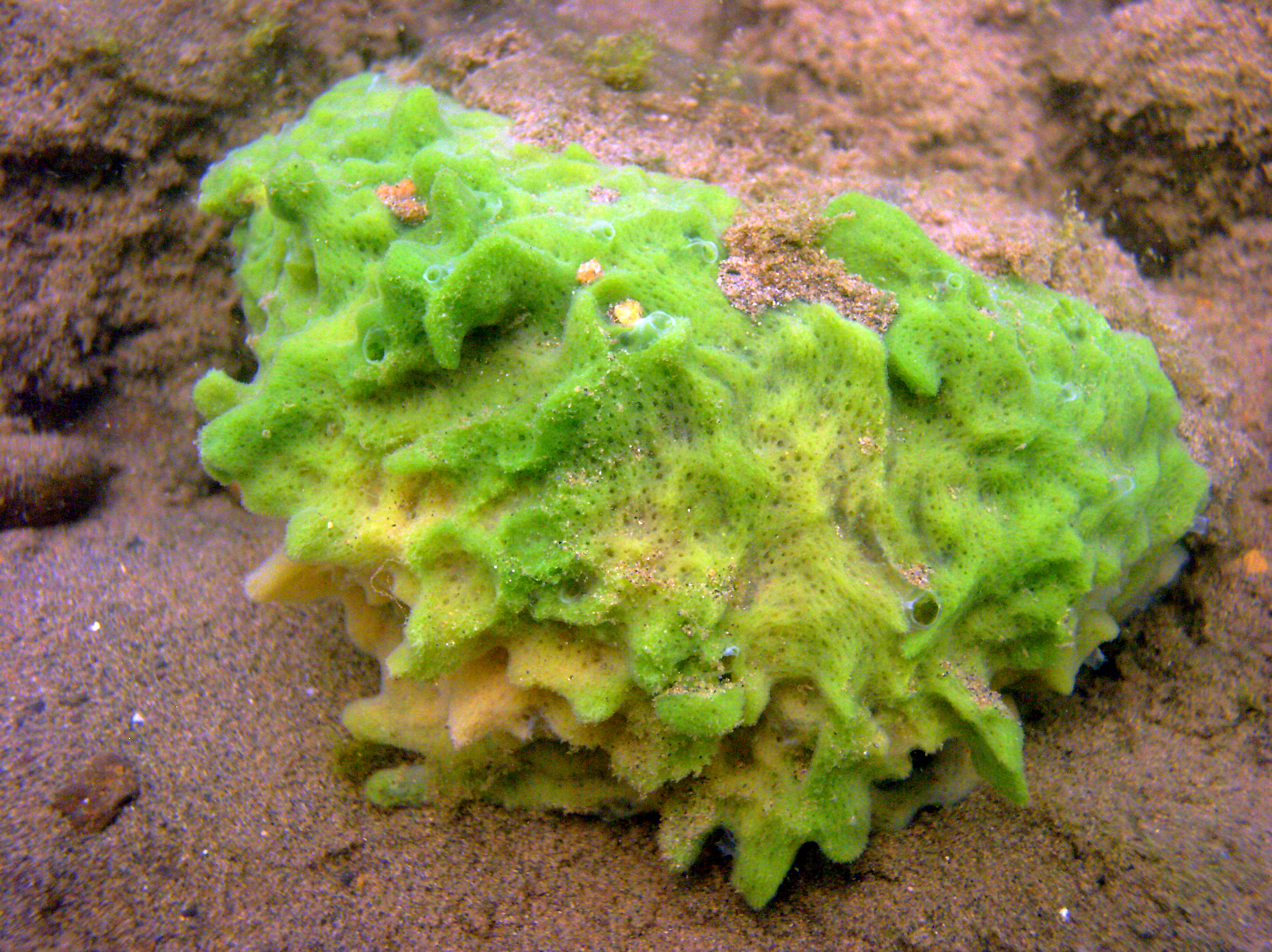
- Spongilla lacustris in the Hanford Reach of the Columbia River, Washington, USA.

Scientific classification
- Kingdom: Animalia
- Phylum: Porifera
- Class: Demospongiae
- Order: Spongillida
- Family: Spongillidae
- Genus: Spongilla; Lamarck, 1816

Species
- See text

Synonyms
- Crelloxea Hechtel, 1983; Euspongilla Vejdovsky, 1883; Spongilla (Euspongilla) Vejdovsky, 1883

= Spongilla =

Genus of sponges

Spongilla is a genus of freshwater sponges. They can be found on submerged objects in clean lakes, ponds, streams, and rivers. Spongilla was first publicly recognized in 1696 by Leonard Plukenet and described by Jean-Baptiste Lamarck in 1816. The type species is Spongilla lacustris, described by Carl Linnaeus.

Spongilla have a leuconoid body form with a skeleton composed of siliceous spicules. They are sessile organisms, attaching themselves to hard substrate such as rocks, logs, and sometimes to ground. Using their ostia and osculum, these sponges filter the water for small aquatic organisms such as protozoans, bacteria, and other free-floating pond life. Sponges of the genus Spongilla partake in symbiotic relationships with the green algae, zoochlorellae, which gives the sponges a green appearance, and without which they would appear white.

Spongilla was used by John Hogg in the 19th century to attempt to justify a fourth kingdom of life.

== Reproduction ==
Spongilla are hermaphrodites, producing egg and sperm. Sperm is released from one sponge and brought in through the ostia of another sponge. Once the sperm reaches the body cavity it fertilizes an egg, which develops into a free-swimming larva. The free-swimming larvae are released out the osculum and will eventually settle and attach elsewhere. Since the larvae are developed inside the spongilla, it is viviparous.

Unlike marine sponges, freshwater sponges are exposed to far more variable environmental conditions, so they have developed gemmules as an overwintering mechanism. This is a form of asexual reproduction. When exposed to environmental factors such as cooler water in the fall, or triggered by endogenous factors in the summer, the sponges form gemmules. Gemmules are highly resistant buds that can live dormant for extended periods of time. When conditions improve, the gemmules "germinate", and a new sponge is born.

== Species ==
- Spongilla alba Carter, 1849
- Spongilla arctica Annandale, 1915
- Spongilla cenota Penney & Racek, 1968
- Spongilla chaohuensis Cheng, 1991
- Spongilla gutenbergiana Müller, Zahn & Maidhof, 1982
- Spongilla helvetica Annandale, 1909
- Spongilla jiujiangensis Cheng, 1991
- Spongilla lacustris Linnaeus, 1758
- Spongilla mucronata Topsent, 1932
- Spongilla permixta Weltner, 1895
- Spongilla prespensis Hadzische, 1953
- Spongilla sarasinorum Weltner, 1901
- Spongilla shikaribensis Sasaki, 1934
- Spongilla stankovici Arndt, 1938
- Spongilla wagneri Potts, 1889
