= Radiospongilla =

Scientific classification
- Domain: Eukaryota
- Kingdom: Animalia
- Phylum: Porifera
- Class: Demospongiae
- Order: Spongillida
- Family: Spongillidae
- Genus: Radiospongilla; Penney & Racek, 1968

Species
- See text

Genus of sponges

Radiospongilla is a genus of freshwater sponges in the family Spongillidae. It was defined by Penney and Racek in 1968. The type species is Radiospongilla sceptroides.

== Species ==
The following species are recognised in the family:

- Radiospongilla amazonensis Volkmer & Maciel, 1983
- Radiospongilla cantonensis (Gee, 1929)
- Radiospongilla cerebellata (Bowerbank, 1863)
- Radiospongilla cinerea (Carter, 1849)
- Radiospongilla crateriformis (Potts, 1882)
- Radiospongilla hemephydatia (Annandale, 1909)
- Radiospongilla hispidula (Racek, 1969)
- Radiospongilla hozawai (Sasaki, 1936)
- Radiospongilla indica (Annandale, 1907)
- Radiospongilla inesi Nicacio & Pinheiro, 2011
- Radiospongilla multispinifera (Gee, 1933)
- Radiospongilla philippinensis (Annandale, 1909)
- Radiospongilla sansibarica (Weltner, 1895)
- Radiospongilla sceptroides (Haswell, 1883)
- Radiospongilla sendai (Sasaki, 1936)
- Radiospongilla sinoica (Racek, 1969)
- Radiospongilla streptasteriformis Stanisic, 1978
