= Trochospongilla =

Scientific classification
- Domain: Eukaryota
- Kingdom: Animalia
- Phylum: Porifera
- Class: Demospongiae
- Order: Spongillida
- Family: Spongillidae
- Genus: Trochospongilla; Vejdovsky, 1888

Genus of sponges

Trochospongilla is a genus of sponges belonging to the family Spongillidae.

The genus has almost cosmopolitan distribution.

Species:

- Trochospongilla amazonica (Weltner, 1895)
- Trochospongilla delicata Bonetto & Ezcurra de Drago, 1967
- Trochospongilla gregaria (Bowerbank, 1863)
