= Heteromeyenia =

Scientific classification
- Domain: Eukaryota
- Kingdom: Animalia
- Phylum: Porifera
- Class: Demospongiae
- Order: Spongillida
- Family: Spongillidae
- Genus: Heteromeyenia; Potts, 1881

Genus of sponges

Heteromeyenia is a genus of sponges belonging to the family Spongillidae.

The genus has almost cosmopolitan distribution.

Species:

- Heteromeyenia baileyi (Bowerbank, 1863)
- Heteromeyenia barlettai Pinheiro, Calheira & Hajdu, 2015
- Heteromeyenia cristalina Batista, Volkmer-Ribeiro & Melão, 2007
- Heteromeyenia horsti Ezcurra de Drago, 1988
- Heteromeyenia insignis Weltner, 1895
- Heteromeyenia latitenta (Potts, 1881)
- Heteromeyenia longistylis Mills, 1884
- Heteromeyenia repens (Potts, 1880)
- Heteromeyenia stepanowii (Dybowski, 1884)
- Heteromeyenia tentasperma (Potts, 1880)
- Heteromeyenia tubisperma (Potts, 1881)
