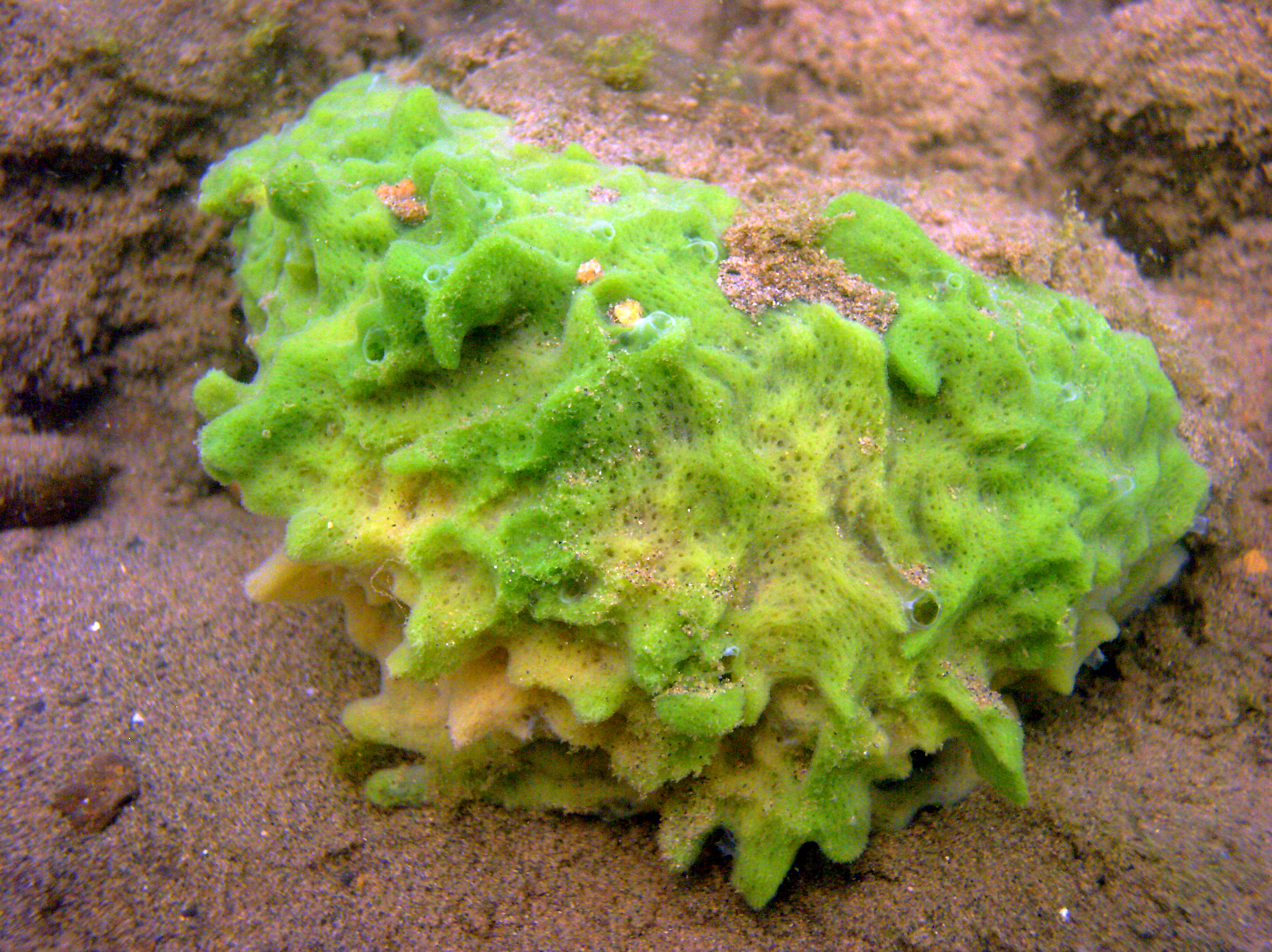
- Spongilla lacustris
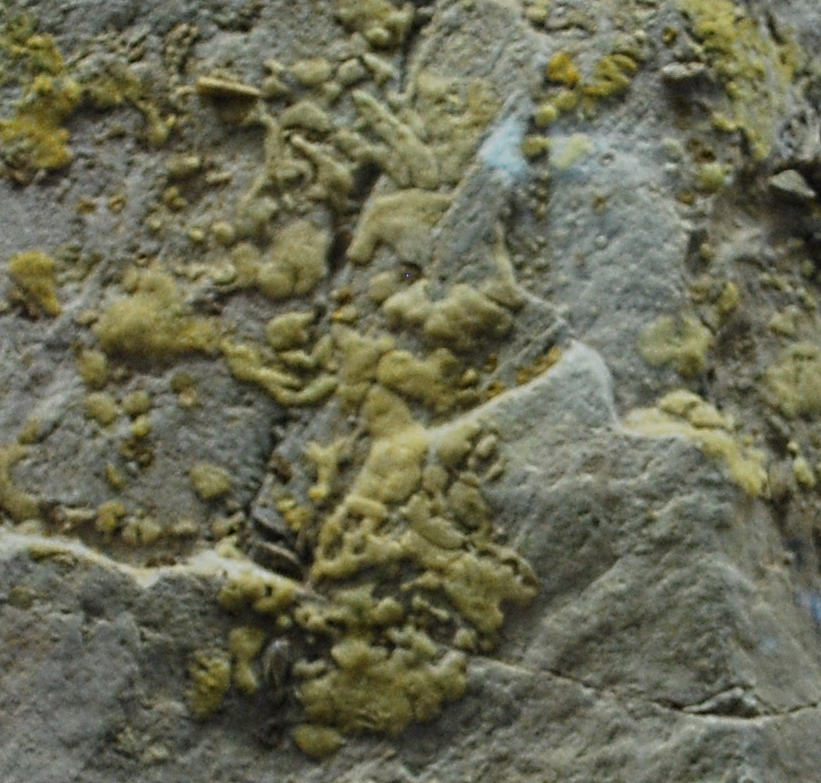
- Spongilla prespensis

Scientific classification
- Kingdom: Animalia
- Phylum: Porifera
- Class: Demospongiae
- Order: Spongillida
- Family: Spongillidae; Gray, 1867

Genera
- See text

= Spongillidae =

Family of sponges

Spongilidae is a family of sponges that live in freshwater lakes, ponds, rivers, and streams. The family contains about 170 different species. The following genera are recognized in the family:

- Anheteromeyenia Schröder, 1927
- Corvoheteromeyenia Ezcurra de Drago, 1979
- Corvospongilla Annandale, 1911
- Dosilia Gray, 1867
- Duosclera Reiswig & Ricciardi, 1993
- Ephydatia Lamouroux, 1816
- Eunapius Gray, 1867
- Heteromeyenia Potts, 1881
- Heterorotula Penney & Racek, 1968
- Nudospongilla Annandale, 1918
- Pachyrotula Volkmer-Ribeiro & Rützler, 1997
- Pectispongilla Annandale, 1909
- Pottsiela Volkmer-Ribeiro, Souza-Machado, Furstenau-Oliveira, Vieira-Soares, 2010
- Racekiela Bass & Volkmer-Ribeiro, 1998
- Radiospongilla Penney & Racek, 1968
- Sanidastra Volkmer-Ribeiro & Watanabe, 1983
- Saturnospongilla Volkmer-Ribeiro, 1976
- Spongilla Lamarck, 1816
- Stratospongilla Annandale, 1909
- Trochospongilla Vejdovsky, 1888
- Umborotula Penney & Racek, 1968
- Uruguayella Bonetto & Ezcurra de Drago, 1969
